= Toyota New Global Architecture =

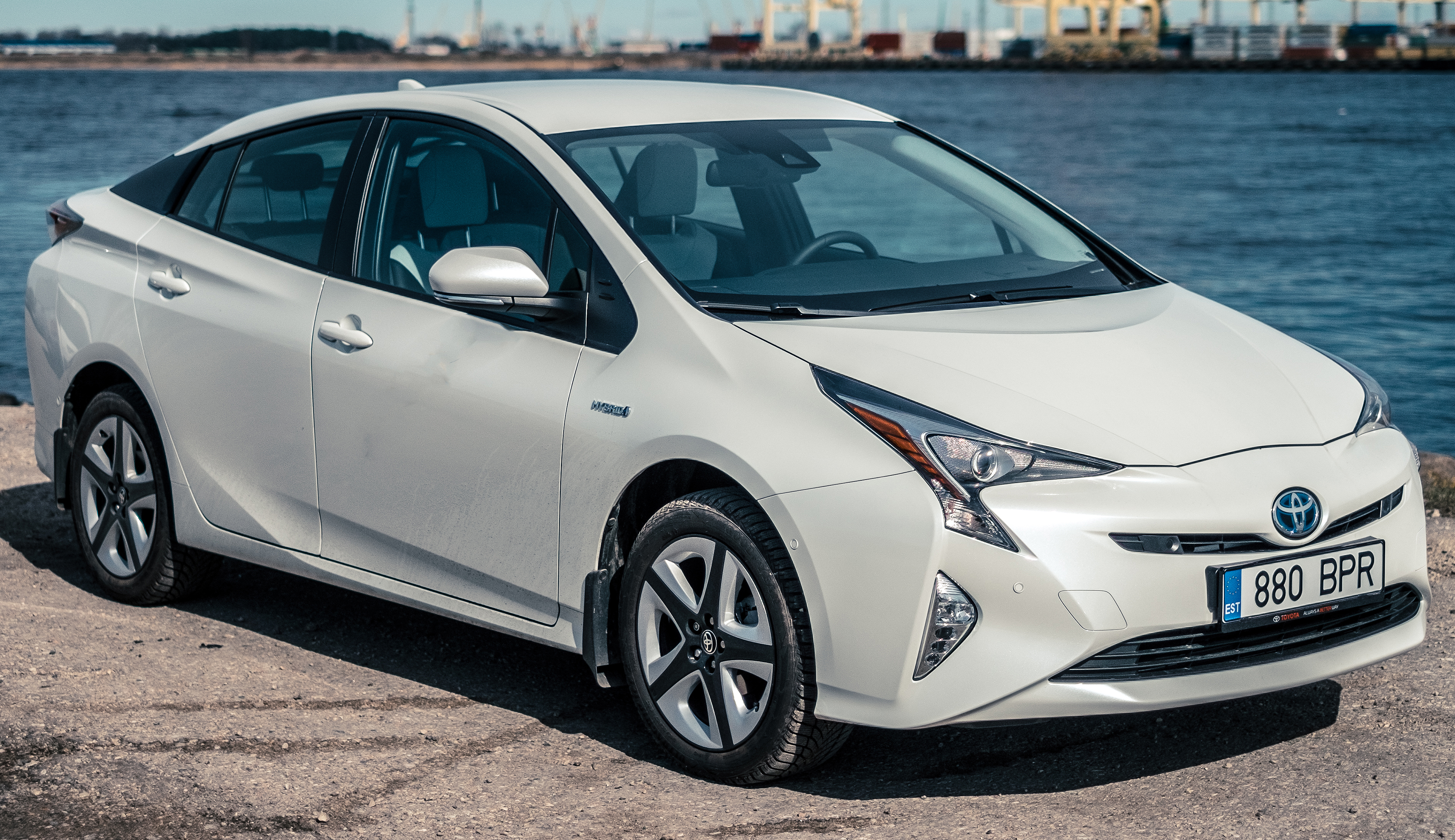
- Fourth-generation Toyota Prius, the first vehicle to use the Toyota New Global Architecture platform

Overview
- Manufacturer: Toyota
- Also called: TNGA
- Production: 2015–present

Body and chassis
- Class: Modular unibody and body-on-frame
- Layout: Front-engine: Front-wheel-drive (FWD); All-wheel-drive (AWD); Rear-wheel-drive (RWD); Rear-engine: Rear-wheel-drive (RWD); Electric (e-TNGA): Dual-motor all-wheel-drive (AWD)
- Platform: TNGA-B; TNGA-C; TNGA-F; TNGA-K; TNGA-L; e-TNGA
- Related: Toyota Dynamic Force engine

Chronology
- Predecessor: Toyota B platform (TNGA-B); Toyota MC/New MC platform (TNGA-C); Toyota K platform (TNGA-K); Toyota N/New N platform (TNGA-L)

The Toyota New Global Architecture (abbreviated as TNGA) is a modular automobile platform that underpins various Toyota and Lexus models, starting with the fourth-generation Prius in late 2015. TNGA platforms accommodate different vehicle sizes and also front-, rear-, and all-wheel drive configurations.

The platforms were developed as part of a company-wide effort to simplify the vehicles being produced by Toyota. Before the introduction of the TNGA, Toyota was building roughly 100 different platform variants. As of 2020, the five TNGA platforms underpinned more than 50% of Toyota vehicles sold worldwide and were expected to underpin about 80% by 2023.

Each platform is based on a standardized seat height that allows for sharing of key interior components such as steering systems, shifters, pedals, seat frames and airbags. These components are often less visible, allowing for cars that share platforms to have unique interiors. Compared to Toyota's older platforms, TNGA costs 20 percent less to produce while offering increased chassis stiffness, lower centers of gravity for better handling and lower hood cowls for better forward visibility.

The TNGA platform was developed alongside the Dynamic Force engine, which similarly is replacing more than 800 engine variants with a much simpler lineup of 17 versions of nine engines. Toyota is also simplifying its lineup of transmissions, hybrid systems, and all-wheel drive systems.

== TNGA-B (GA-B) ==
The TNGA-B platform underpins unibody vehicles in the A-segment or city car, B-segment or subcompact car, subcompact crossover SUV, and mini MPV categories. Developed by the internal "Toyota Compact Car Company", the platform is offered in both front-wheel drive and all-wheel drive variants and is paired with a transverse engine. The platform also supports a wheelbase length of 2,430–2,750 mm (95.7–108.3 in), while only supporting three-cylinder engines. The TNGA-B replaces the older B platform.

Vehicles using platform (calendar years):

- Toyota Yaris — XP210 (2020–present)
  - Mazda2 Hybrid — XP210 (2022–present)
- Toyota Yaris Cross — XP210 (2020–present)
- Toyota GR Yaris — XP210 (2020–present; with the rear from GA-C platform)
- Toyota Aqua — XP210 (2021–present)
- Toyota Sienta — XP210 (2022–present)
- Toyota Aygo X — AB70 (2022–present)
- Lexus LBX — AY10 (2023–present)
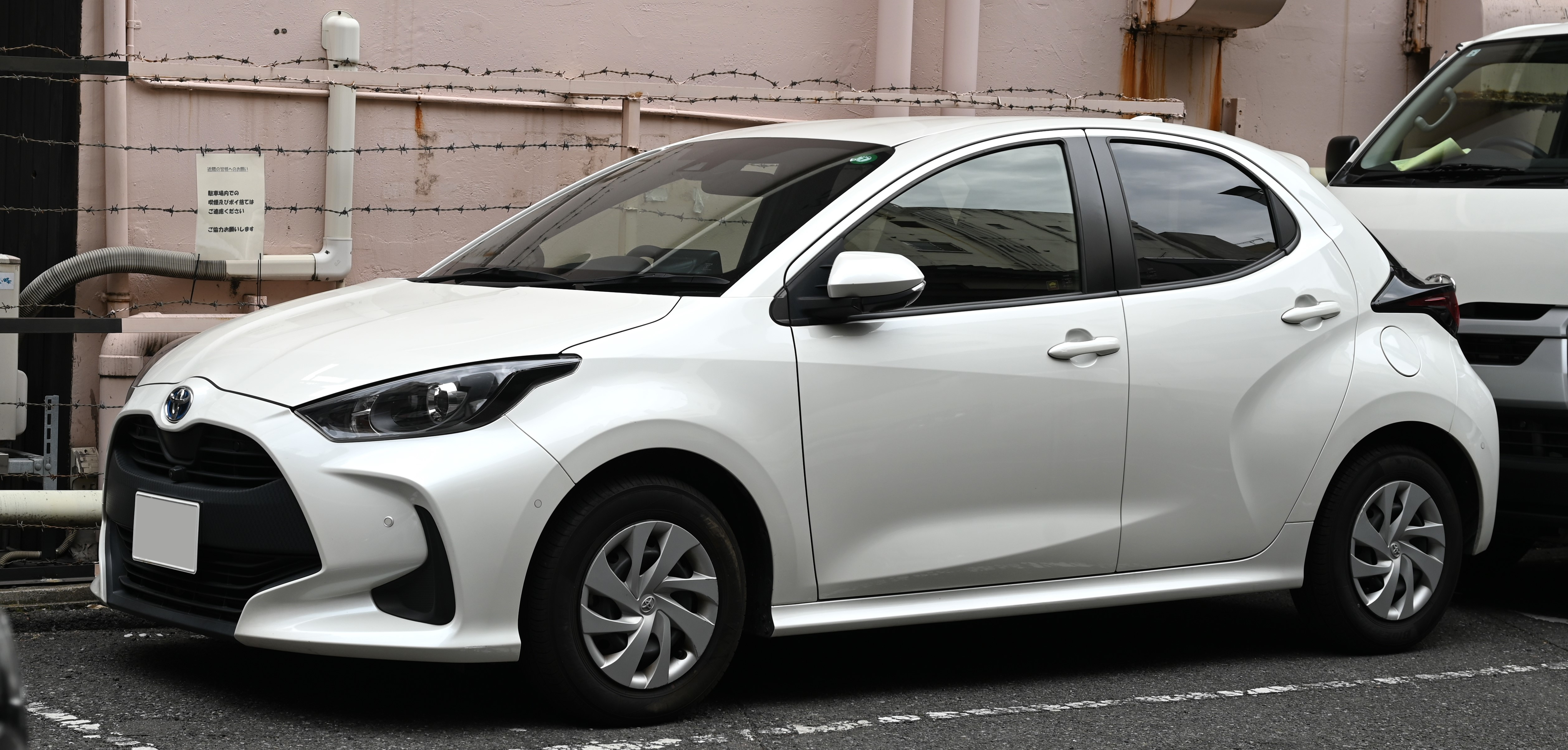
Toyota Yaris

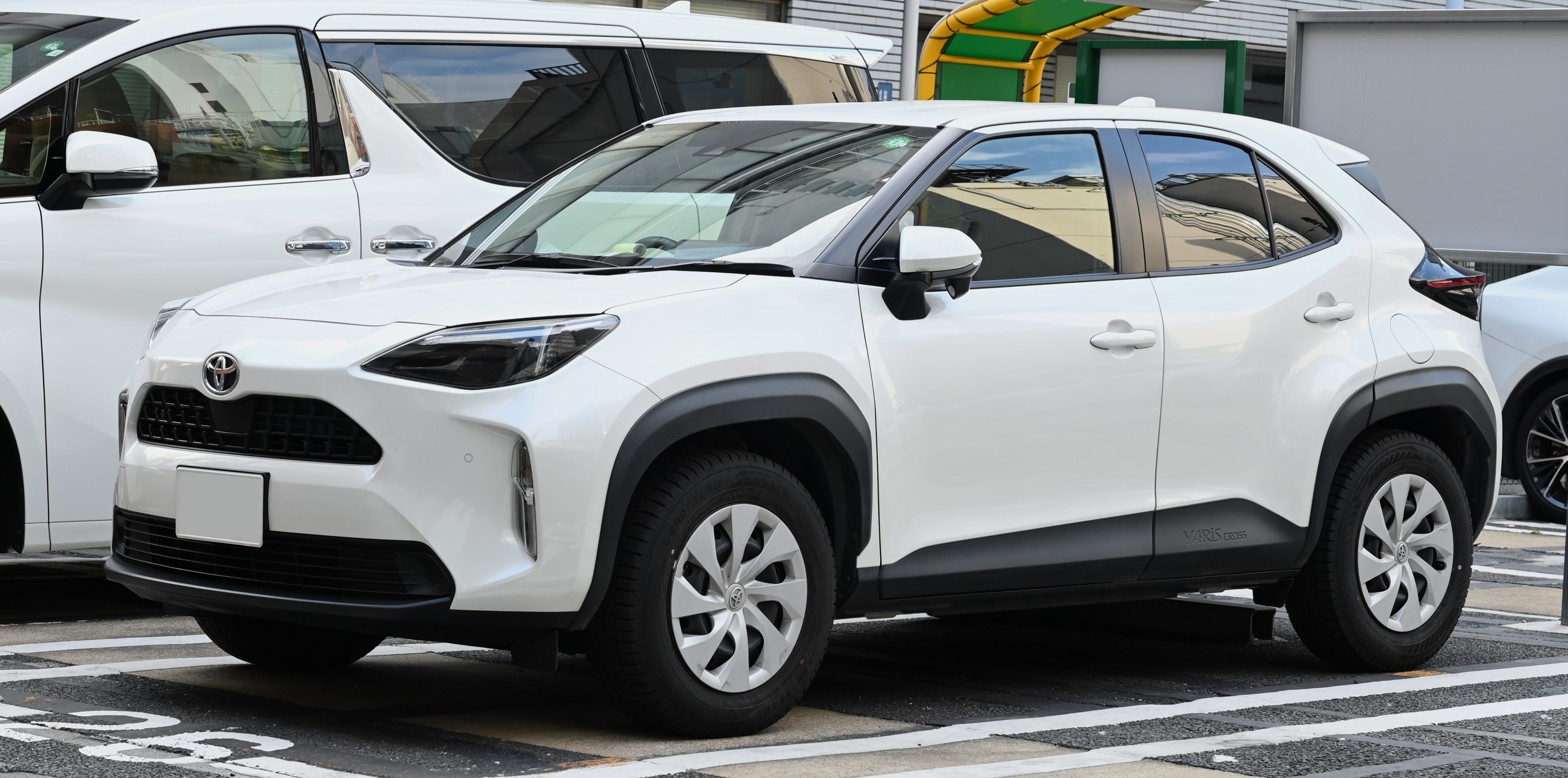
Toyota Yaris Cross

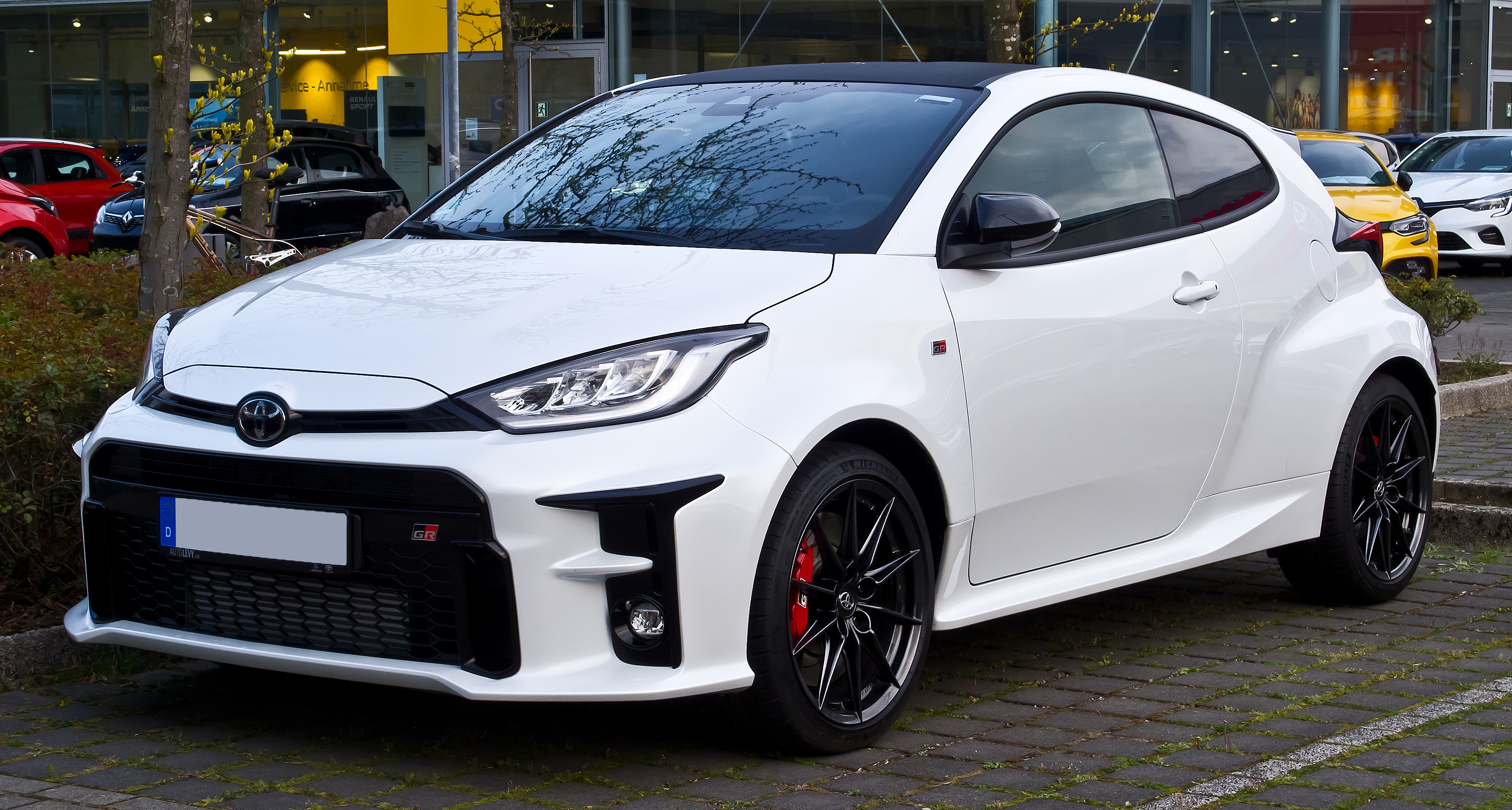
Toyota GR Yaris

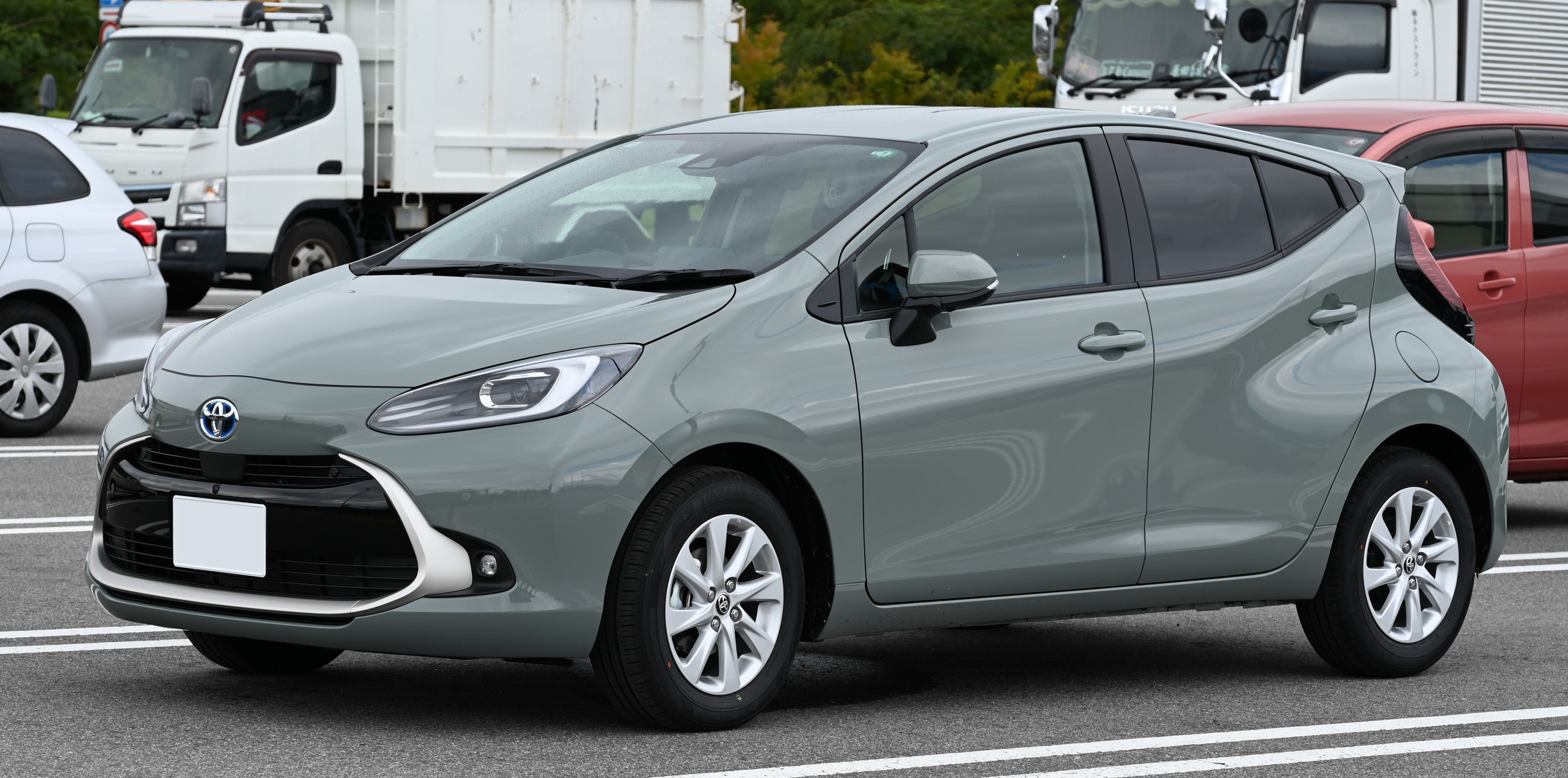
Toyota Aqua

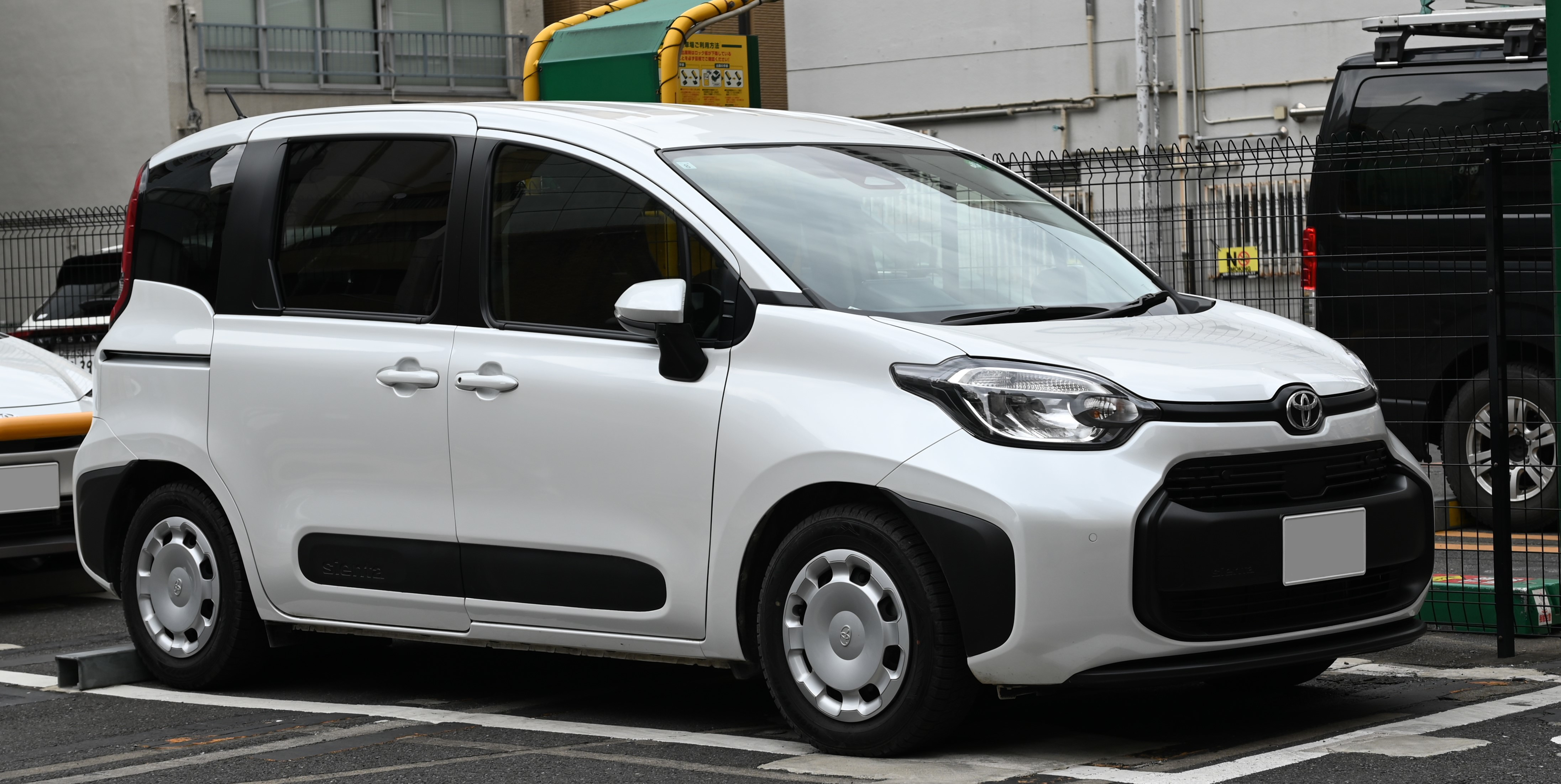
Toyota Sienta

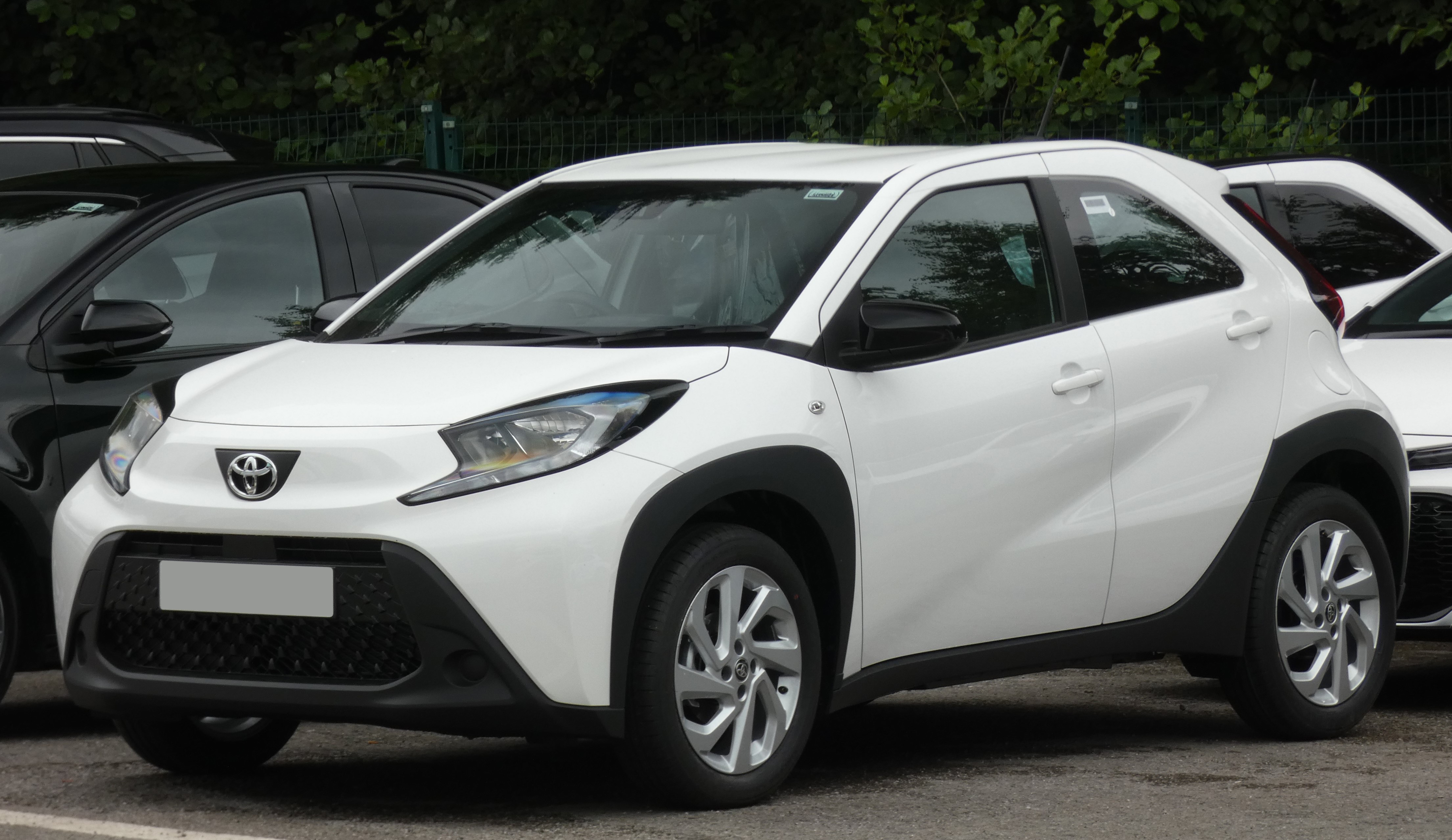
Toyota Aygo X

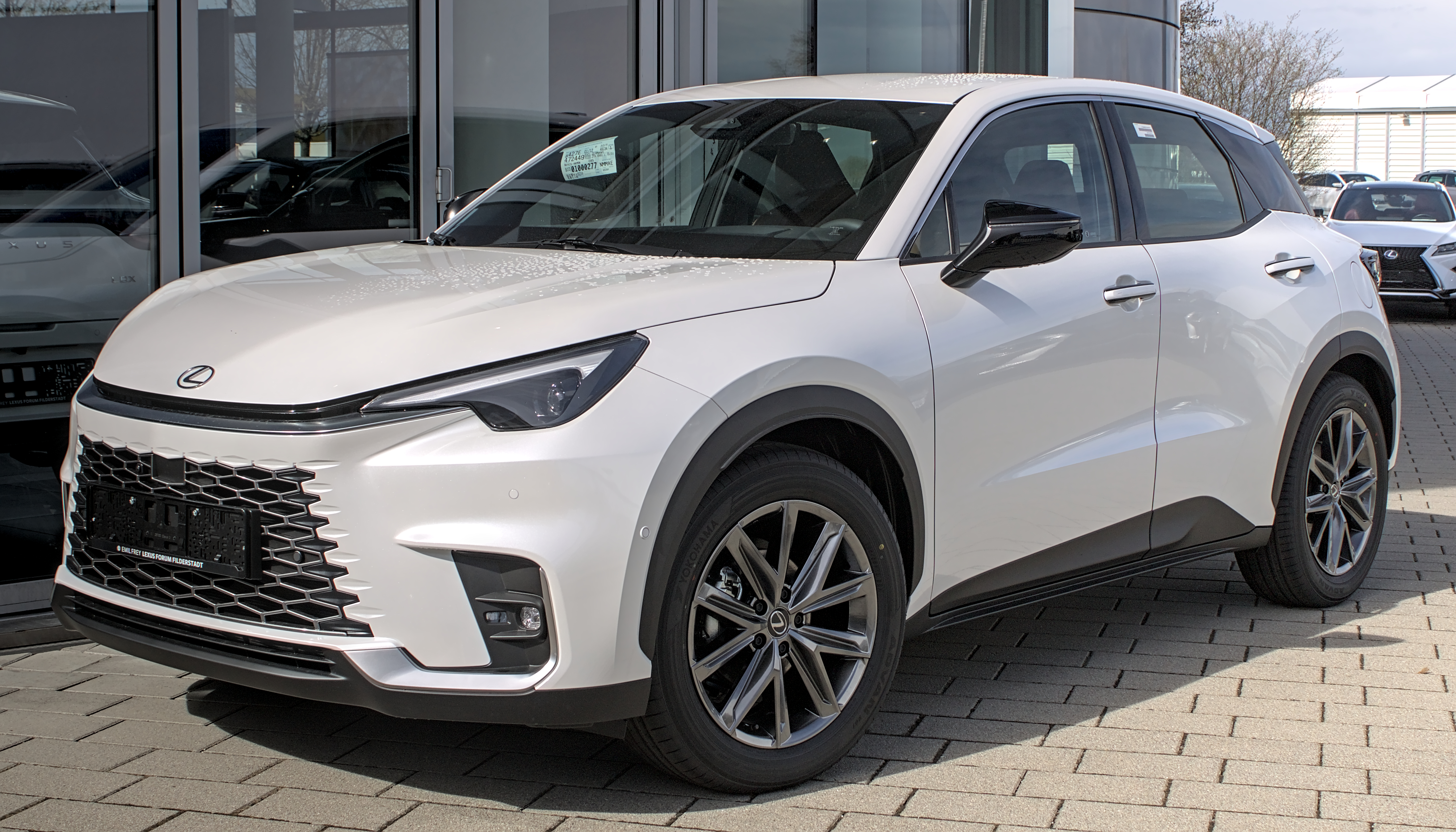
Lexus LBX

== TNGA-C (GA-C) ==
The TNGA-C platform underpins unibody vehicles in the C-segment or compact car, subcompact/compact crossover SUV, and compact/mid-size MPV categories. The platform is offered in both front-wheel drive and all-wheel drive variants and is paired with a transverse engine. The platform also supports a wheelbase length of 2,640–2,850 mm (103.9–112.2 in). The TNGA-C replaces the older MC/New MC platforms.

Vehicles using platform (calendar years):

- Toyota Prius — XW50 (2015–2022)
- Toyota Prius — XW60 (2022–present)
- Toyota C-HR — AX10/AX50 (2016–2023)
  - Toyota IZOA — AX10 (2017–2024)
- Toyota C-HR — AX20 (2023–present)
- Lexus UX — ZA10 (2018–present)
- Toyota Corolla — E210 (2018–present)
  - Suzuki Swace — E210 (2020–2025)
  - Toyota Auris — E210 (2018–2020)
  - Toyota Levin — E210 (2019–present)
  - Toyota Allion — E210 (2021–2025)
  - Toyota GR Corolla — E210 (2022–present)
- Toyota Corolla Cross — XG10 (2020–present)
  - Toyota Frontlander — XG10 (2021–present)
  - Toyota Corolla Deck (2027, upcoming)
- Toyota Noah — R90 (2022–present)
  - Toyota Voxy — R90 (2022–present)
  - Suzuki Landy — R90 (2022–present)
- Toyota Innova — AG10 (2022–present)
  - Suzuki Invicto — AG10 (2023–present)
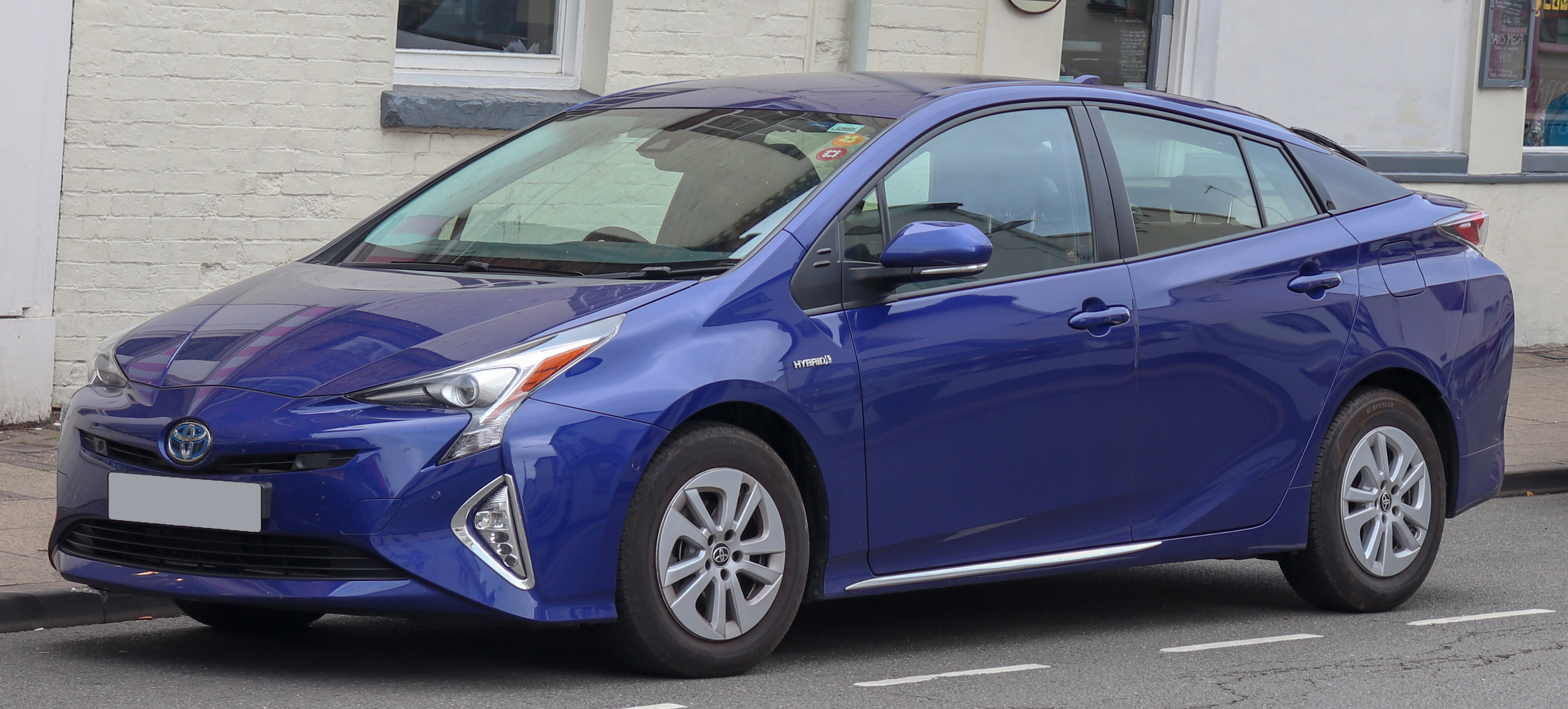
Toyota Prius (XW50)

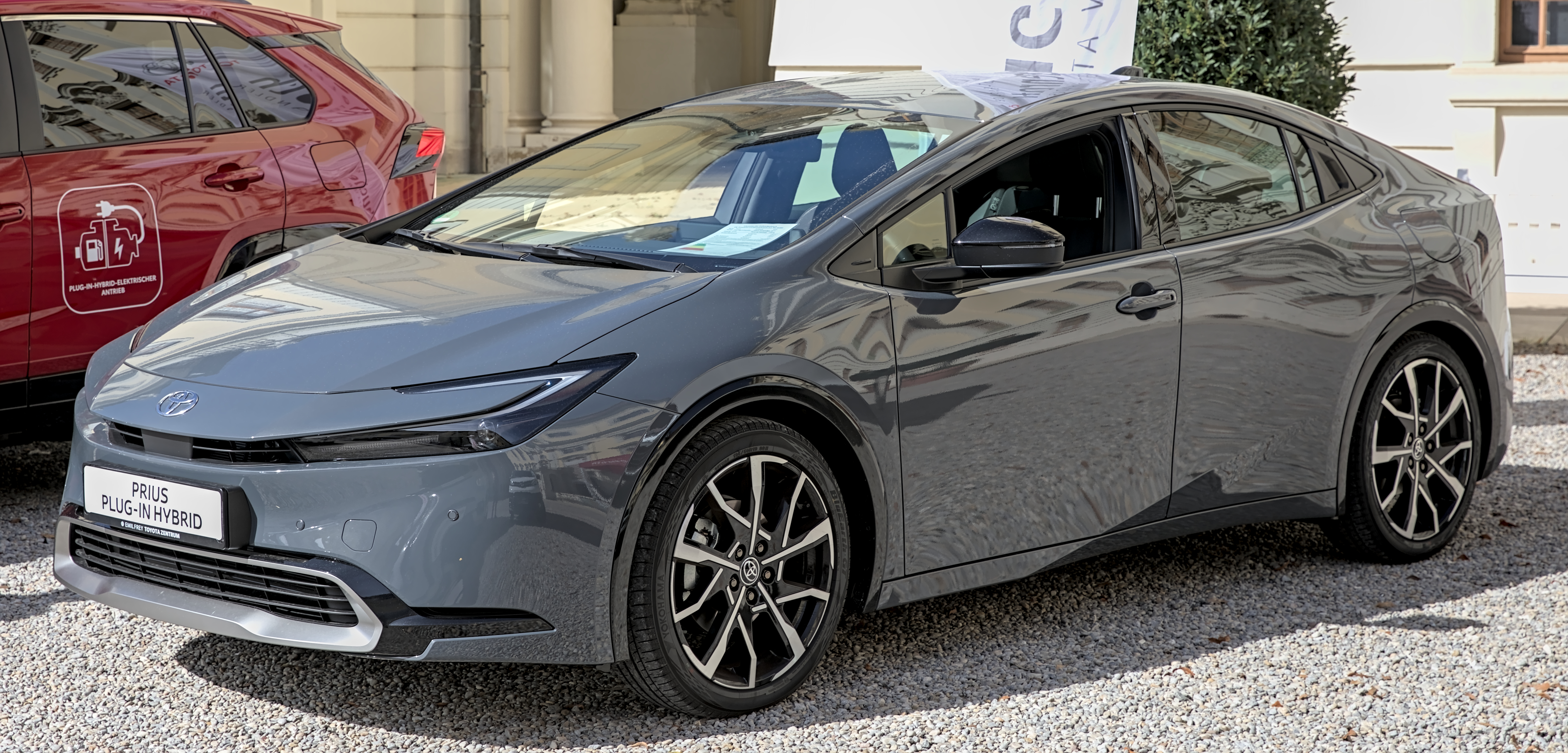
Toyota Prius (XW60)

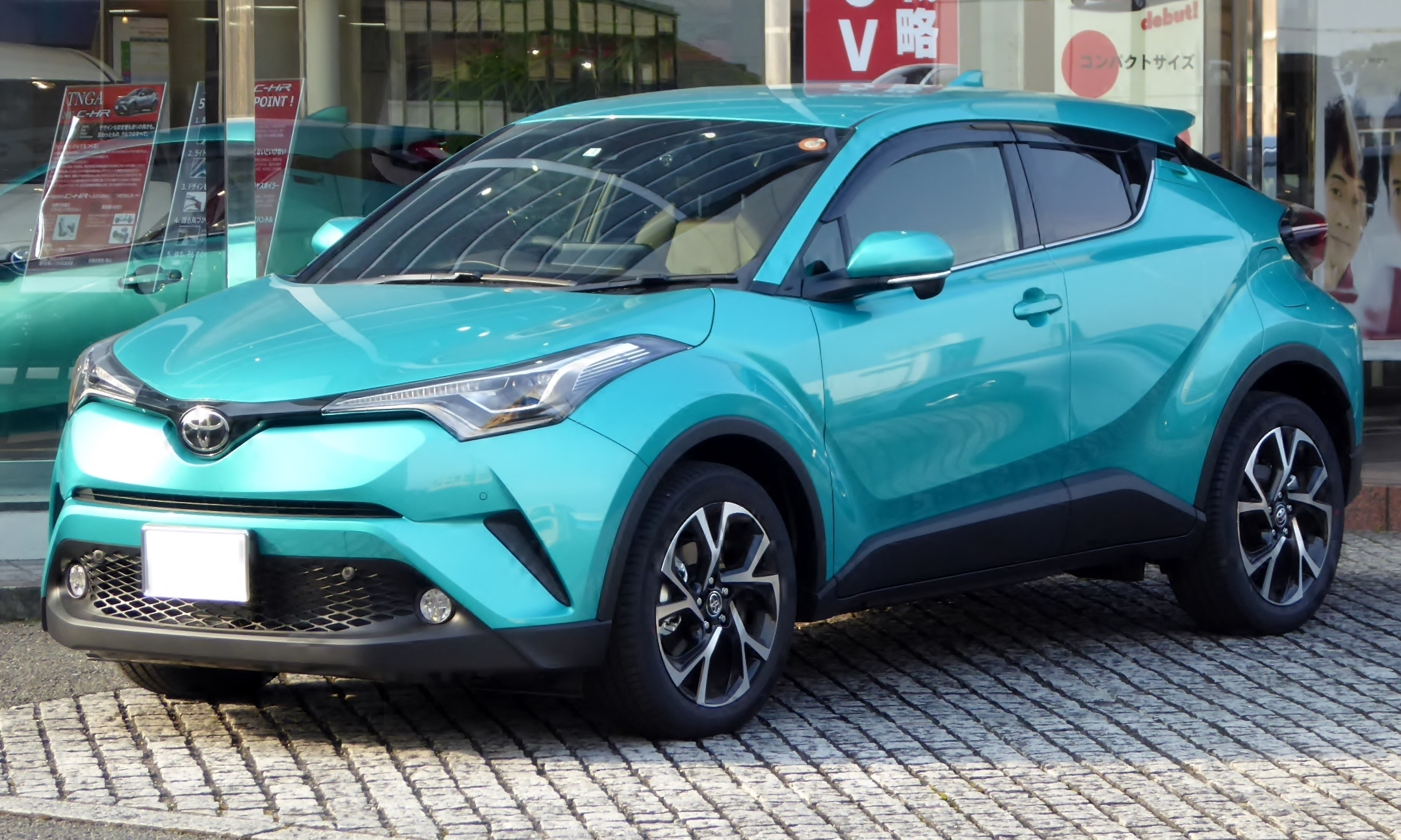
Toyota C-HR (AX10/AX50)

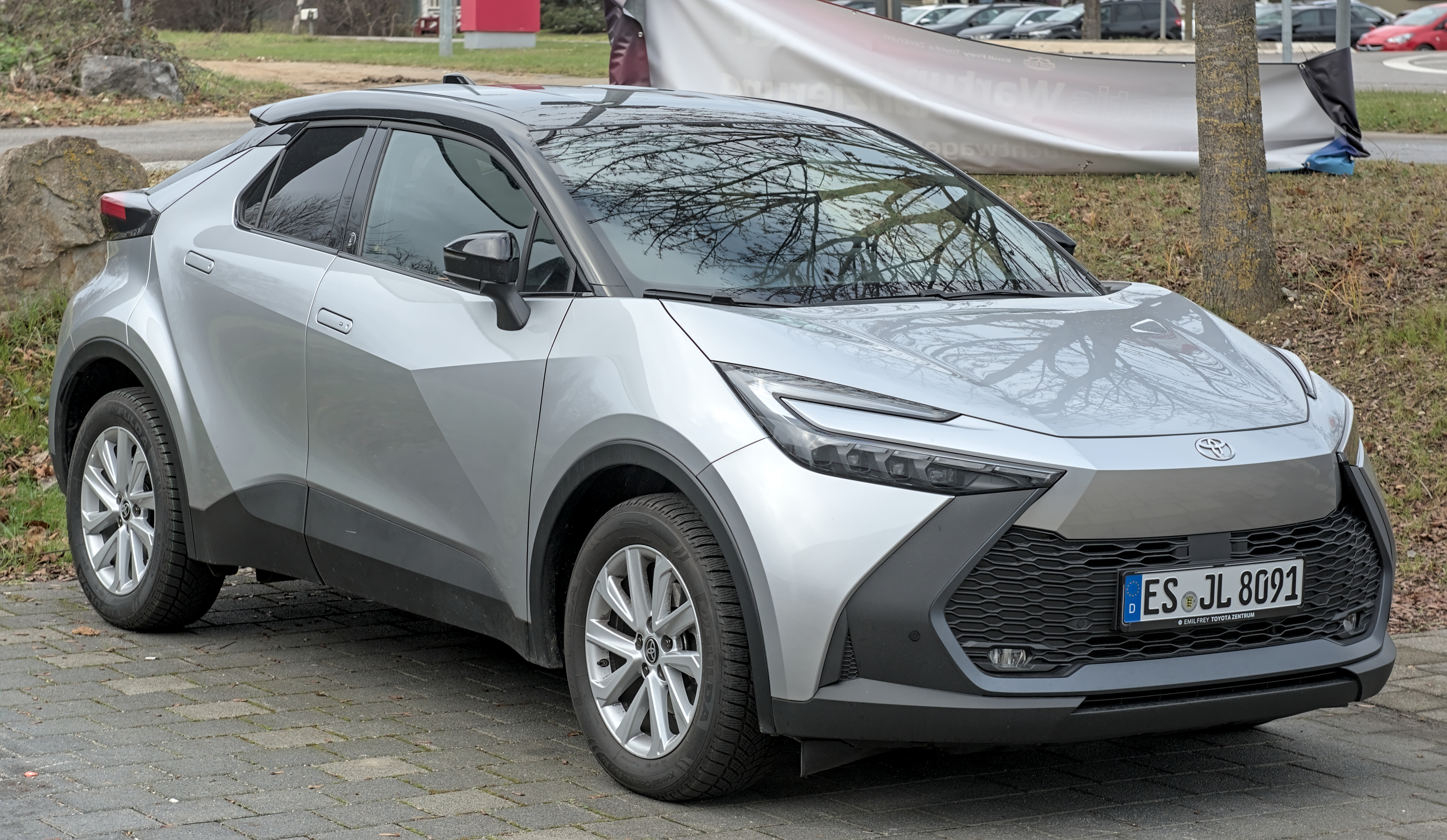
Toyota C-HR (AX20)

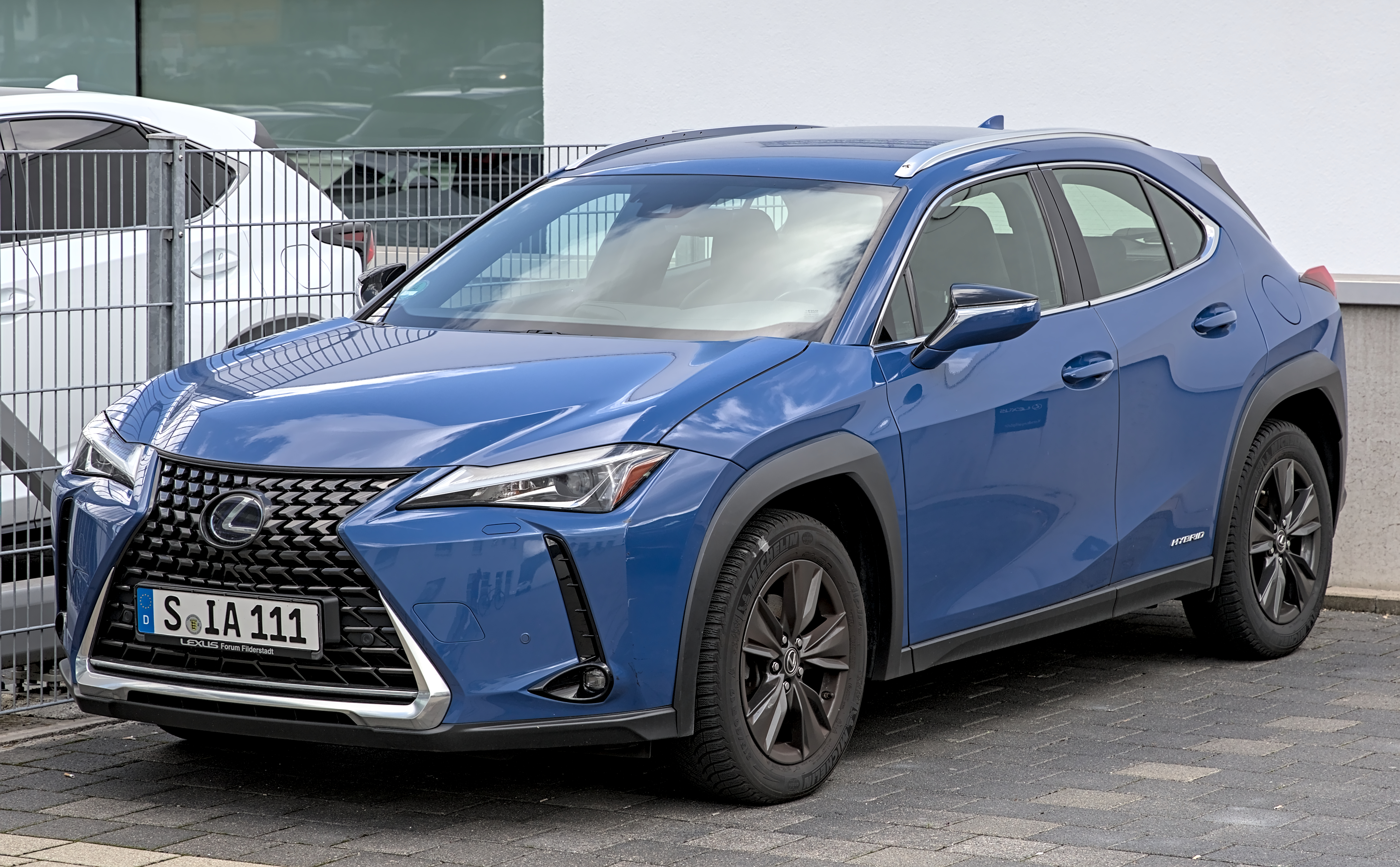
Lexus UX (ZA10)

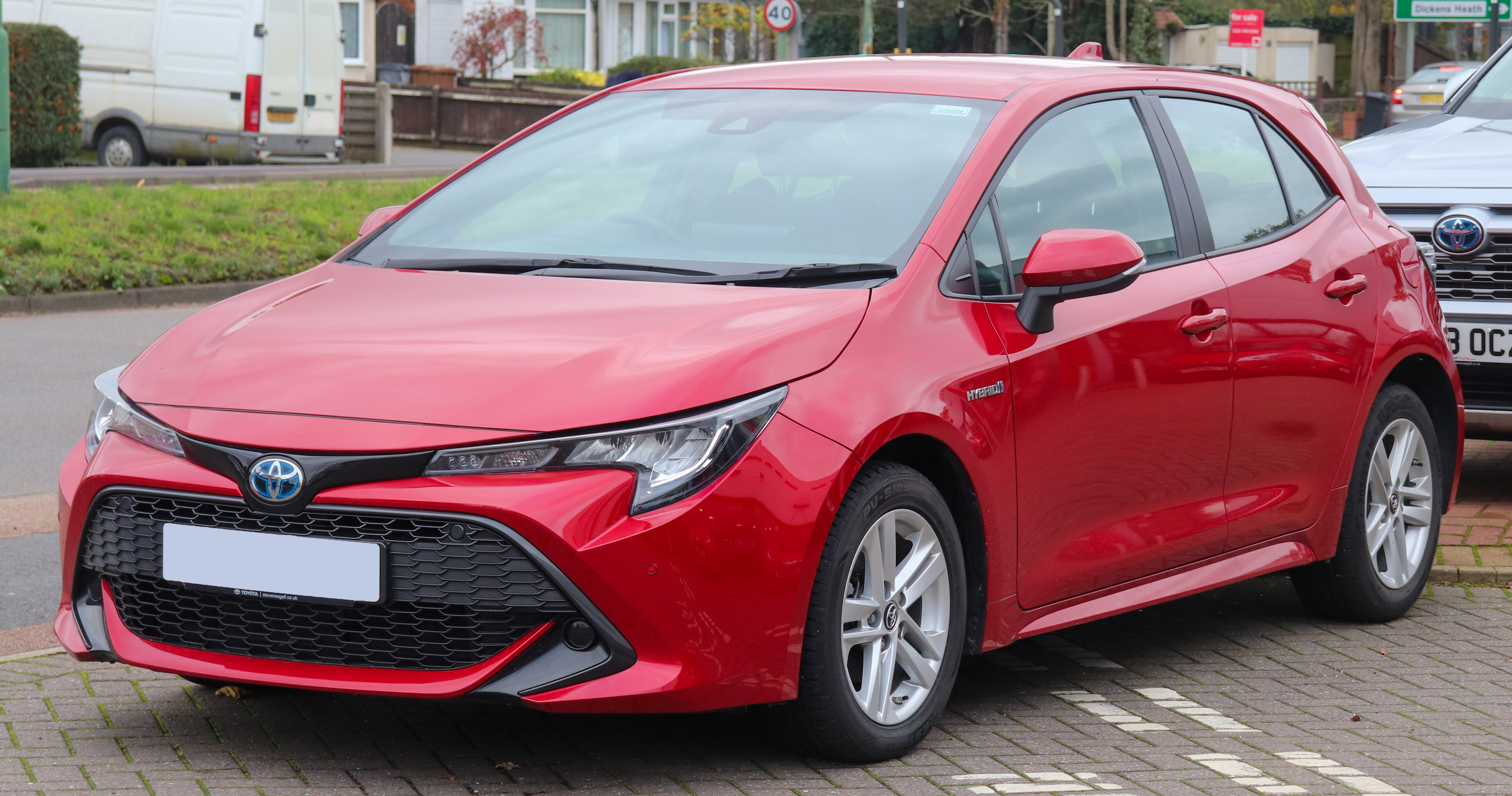
Toyota Corolla (E210)

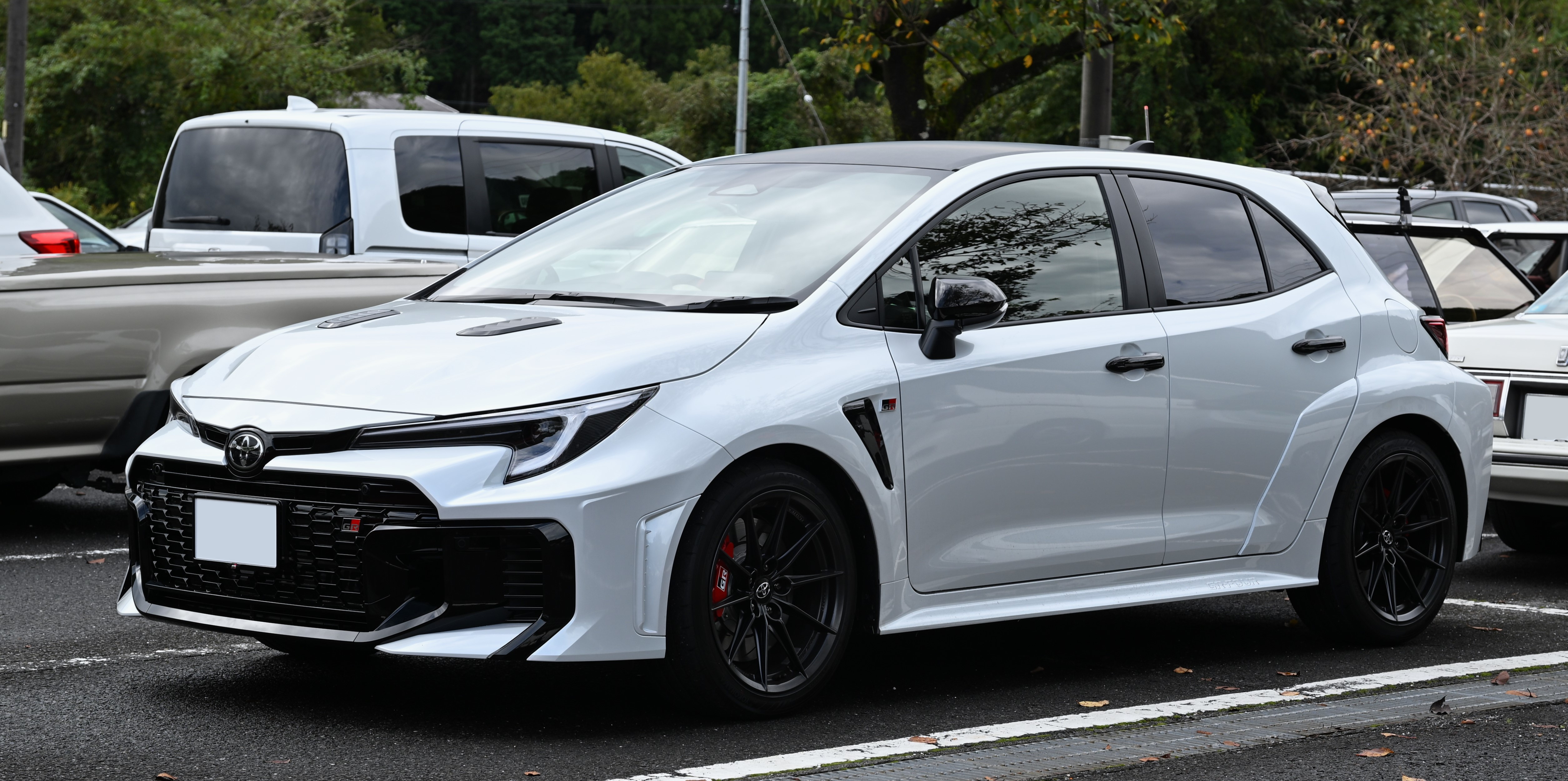
Toyota GR Corolla (E210)

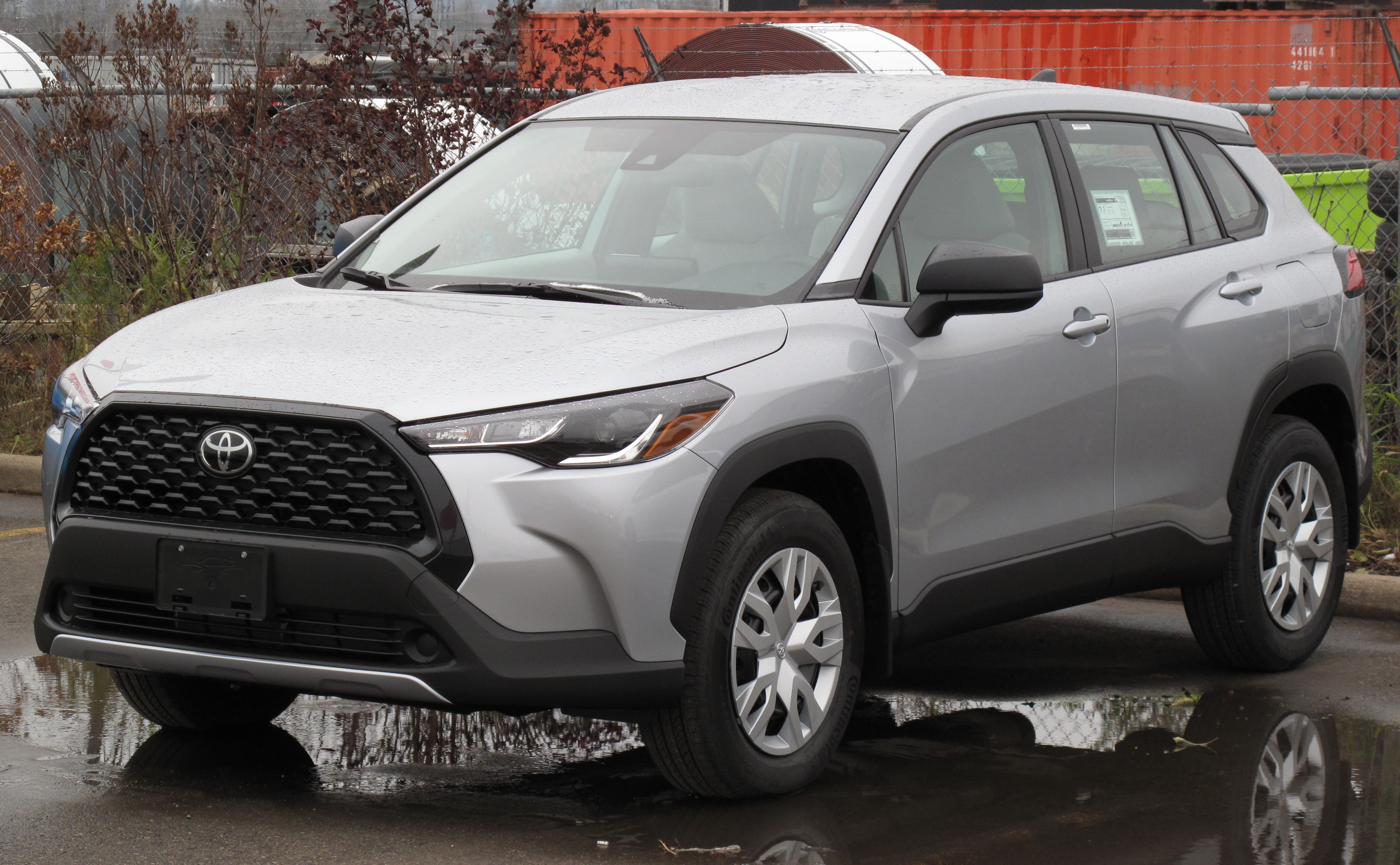
Toyota Corolla Cross (XG10)

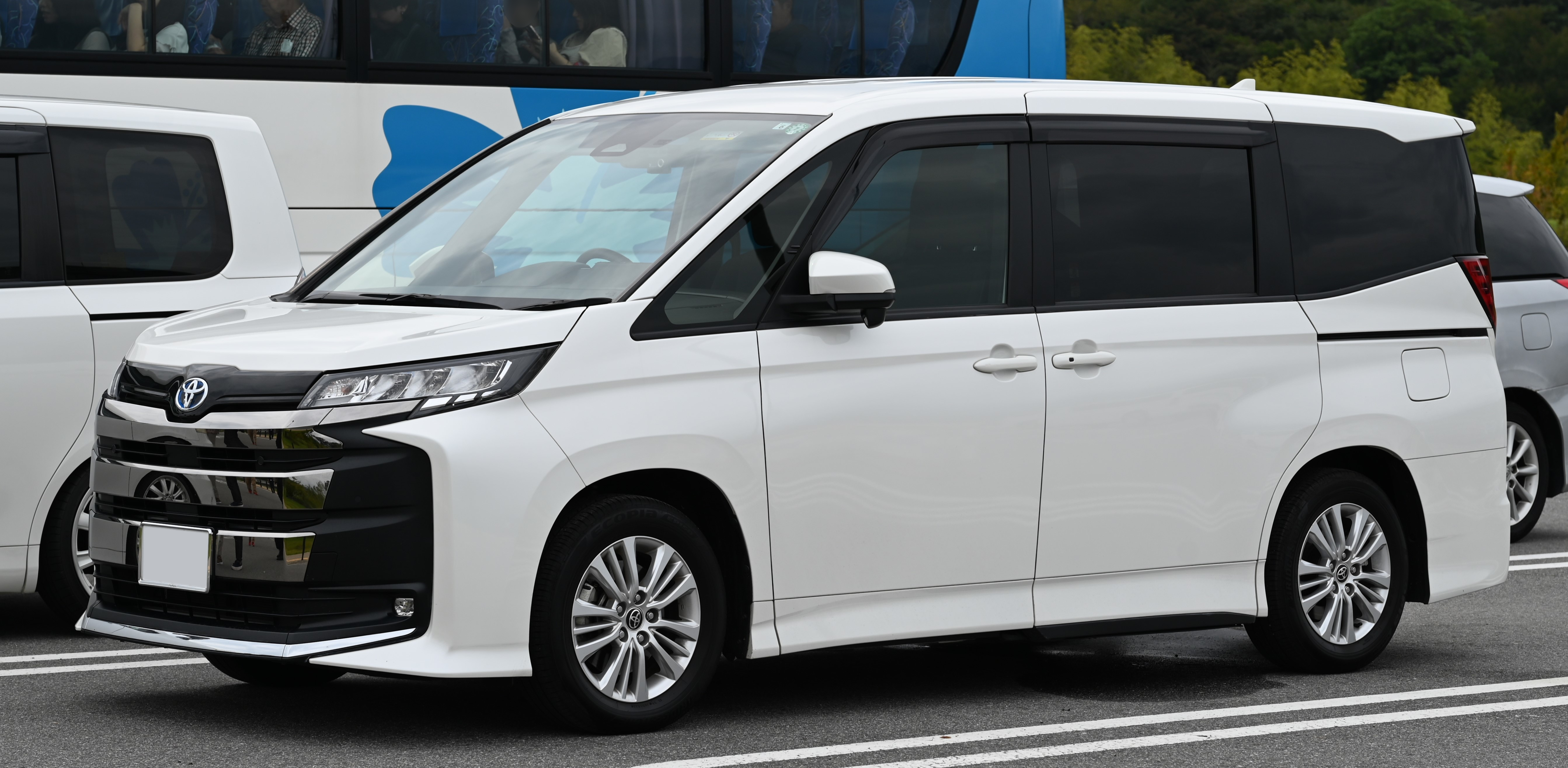
Toyota Noah (R90)

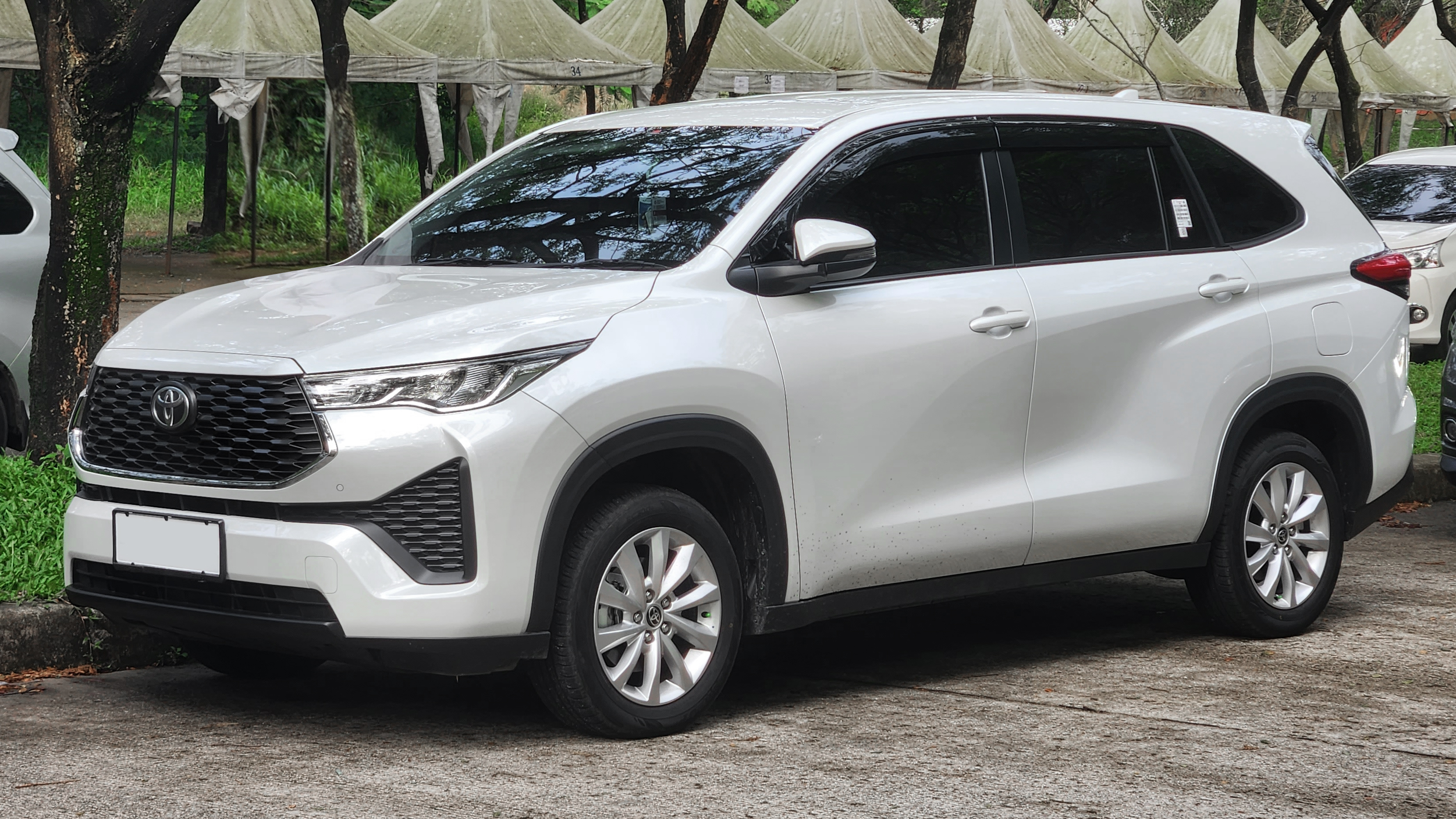
Toyota Innova (AG10)

== TNGA-F (GA-F) ==
The TNGA-F platform underpins body-on-frame vehicles in the mid- and full-size SUV and mid- and full-size pickup truck categories. It supports a wheelbase length of 2,850–4,180 mm (112.2–164.6 in).

Vehicles using platform (calendar years):

- Toyota Land Cruiser — J300 (2021–present)
- Lexus LX — J310 (2021–present)
- Toyota Land Cruiser Prado — J250 (2023–present)
  - Lexus GX — J250 (2023–present)
- Toyota Tundra — XK70 (2021–present)
- Toyota Sequoia — XK80 (2022–present)
- Toyota Tacoma — N400 (2023–present)
- Toyota 4Runner — N500 (2024–present)
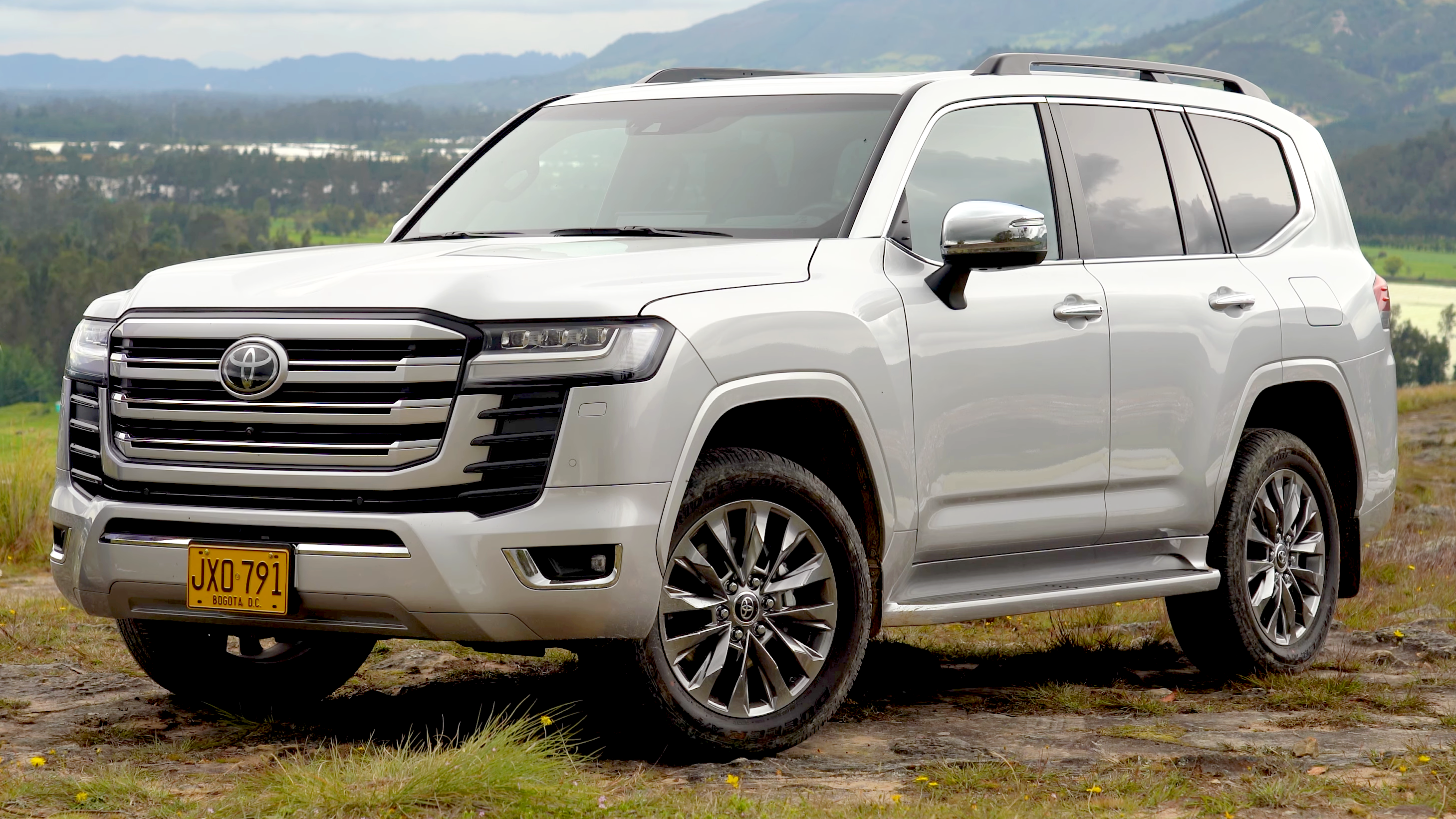
Toyota Land Cruiser

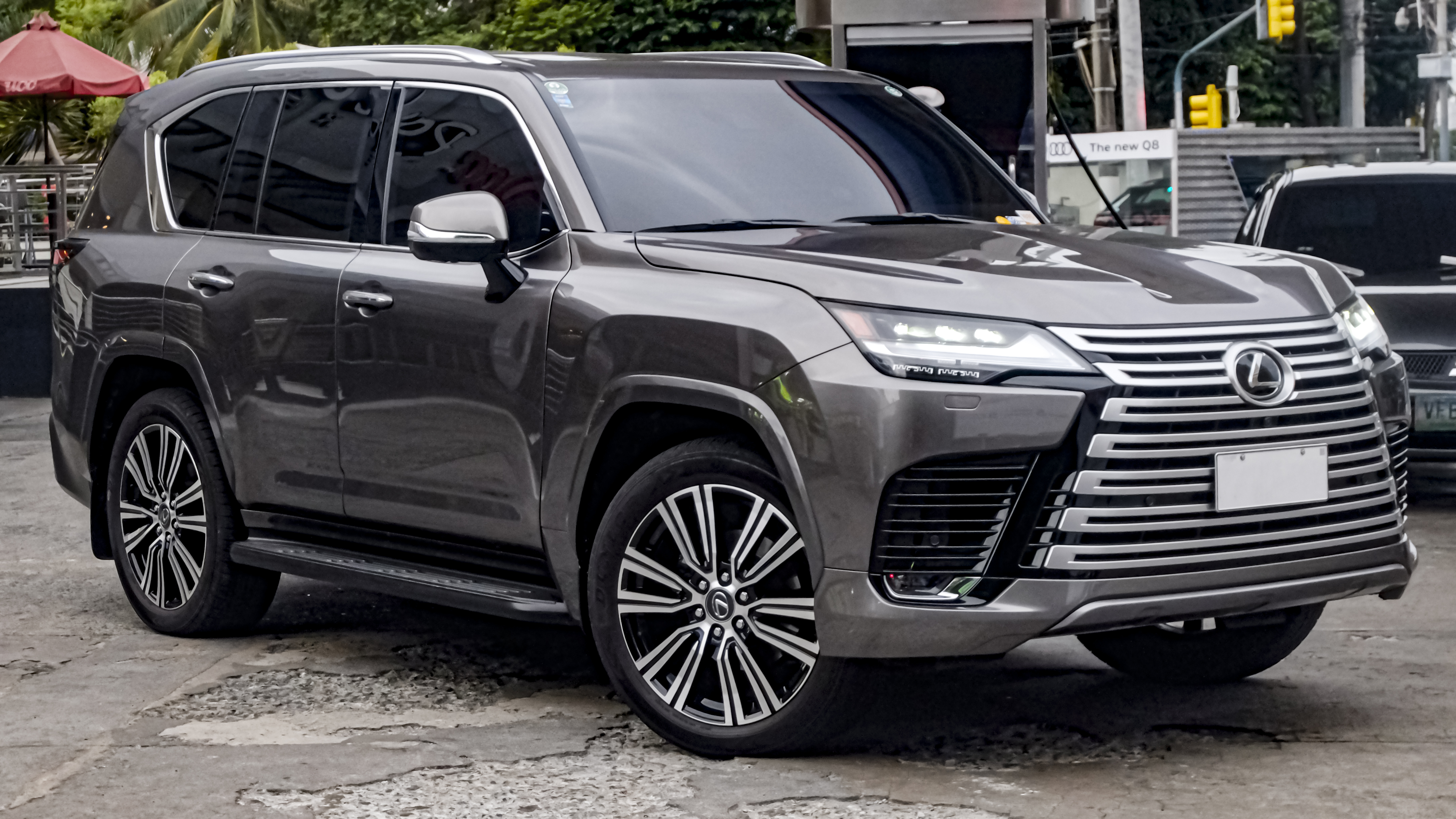
Lexus LX

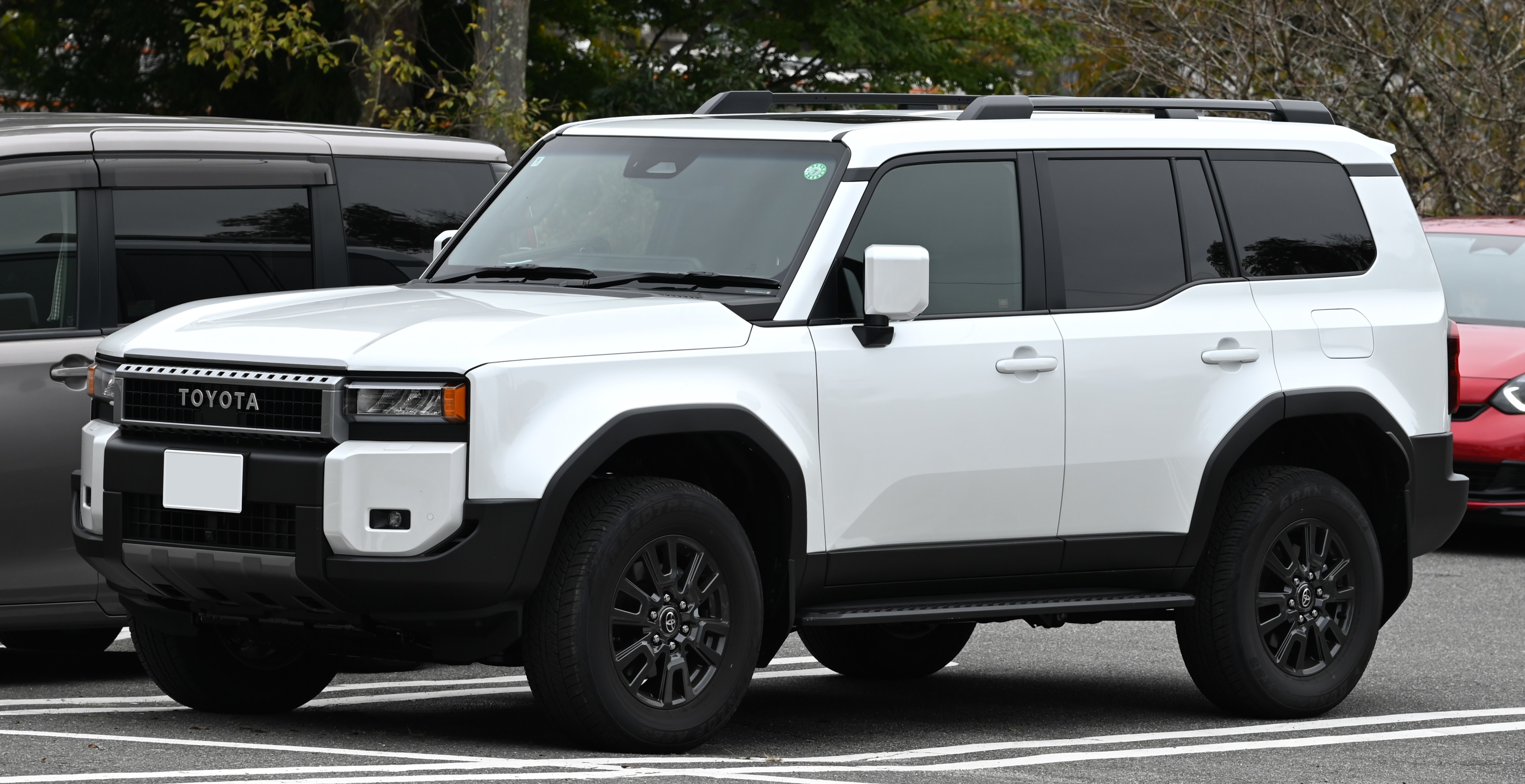
Toyota Land Cruiser Prado

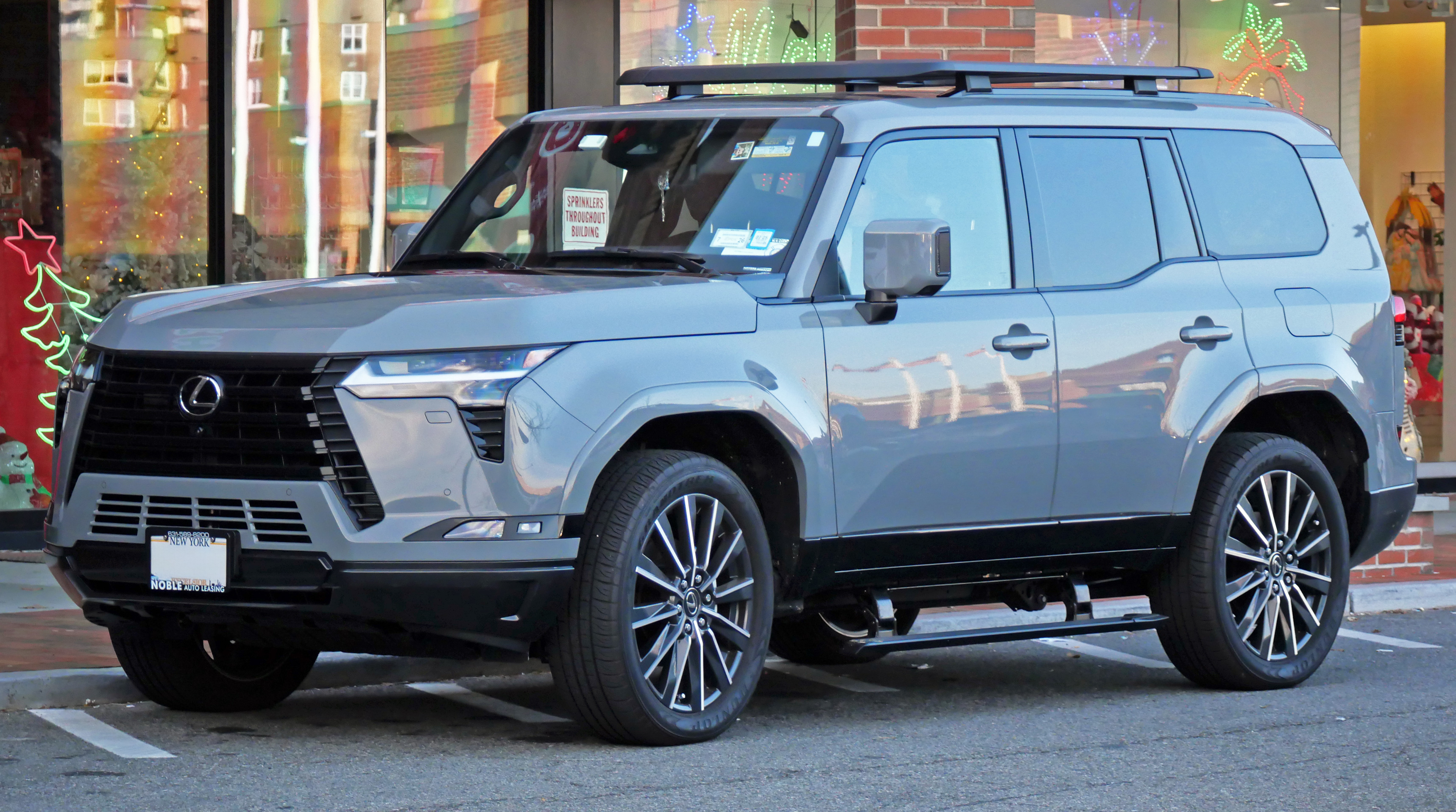
Lexus GX

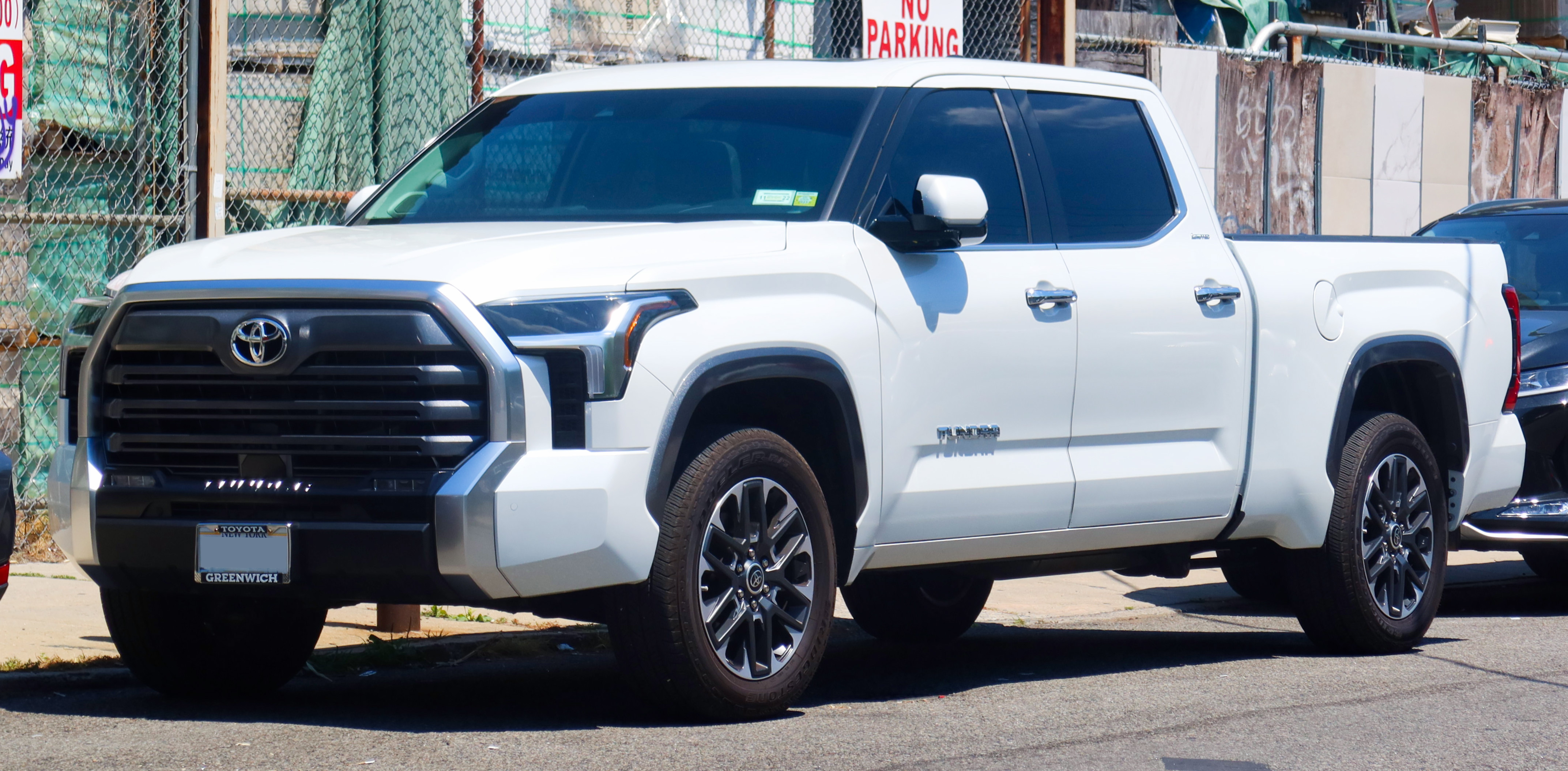
Toyota Tundra

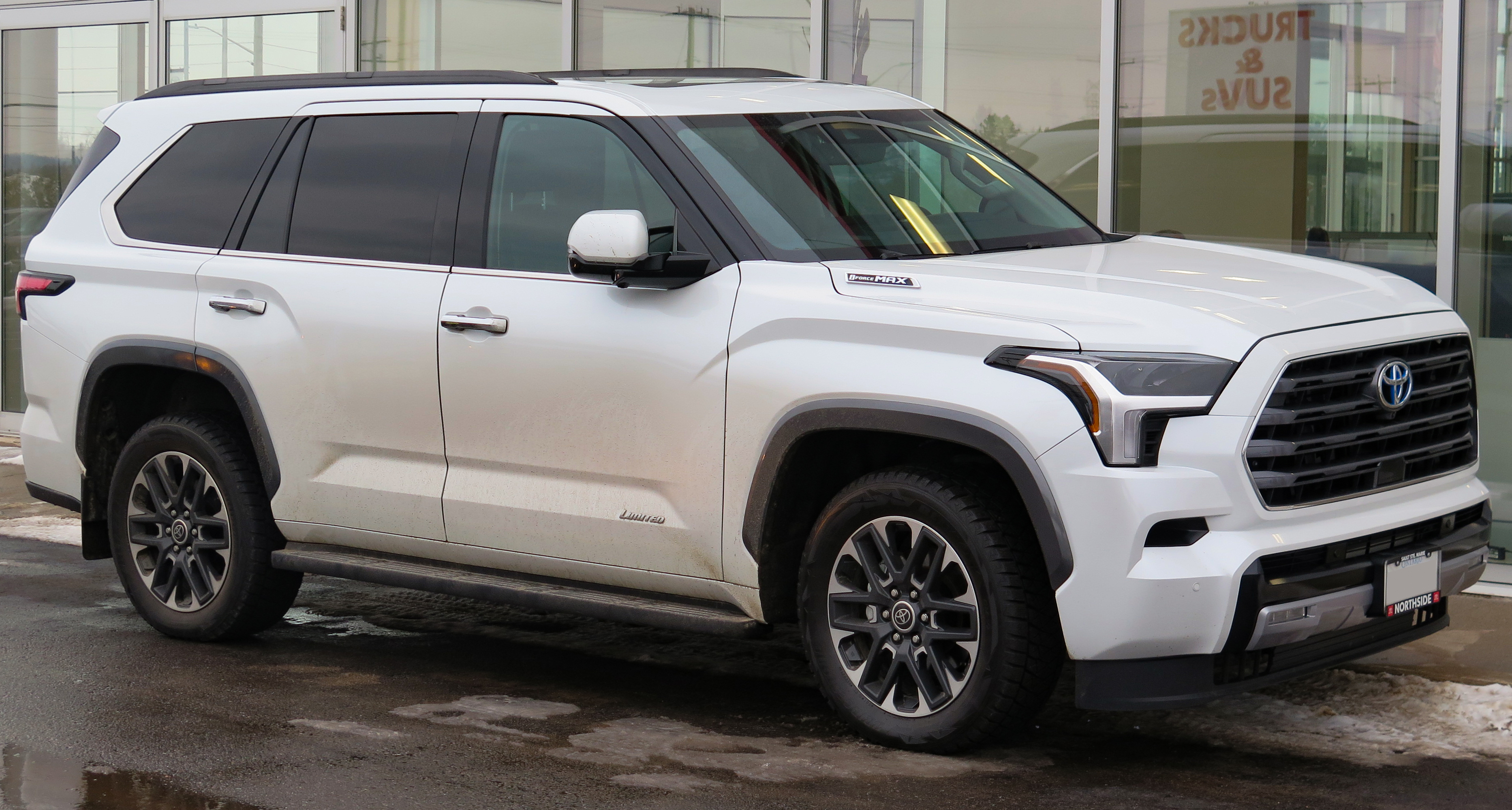
Toyota Sequoia

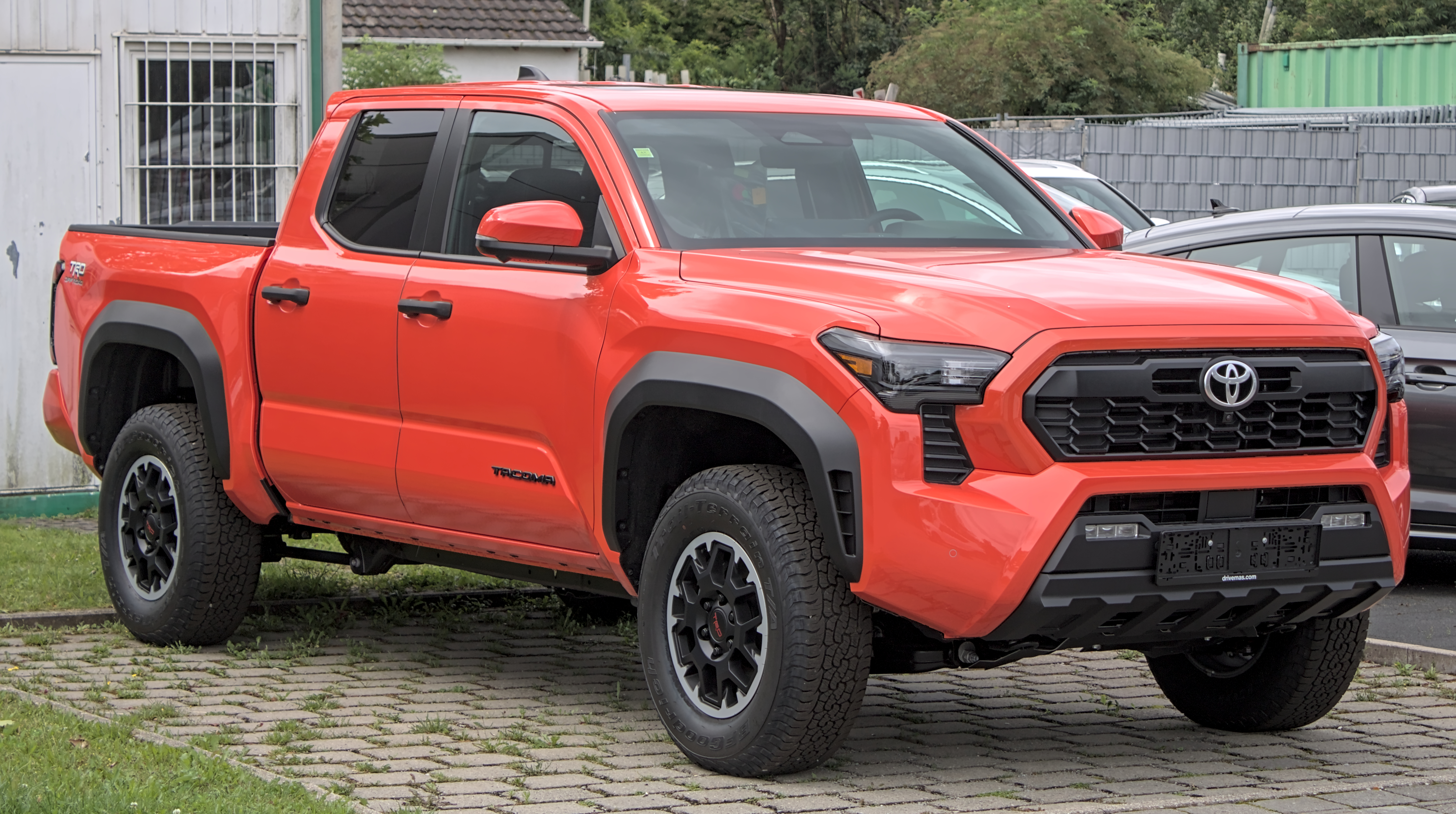
Toyota Tacoma

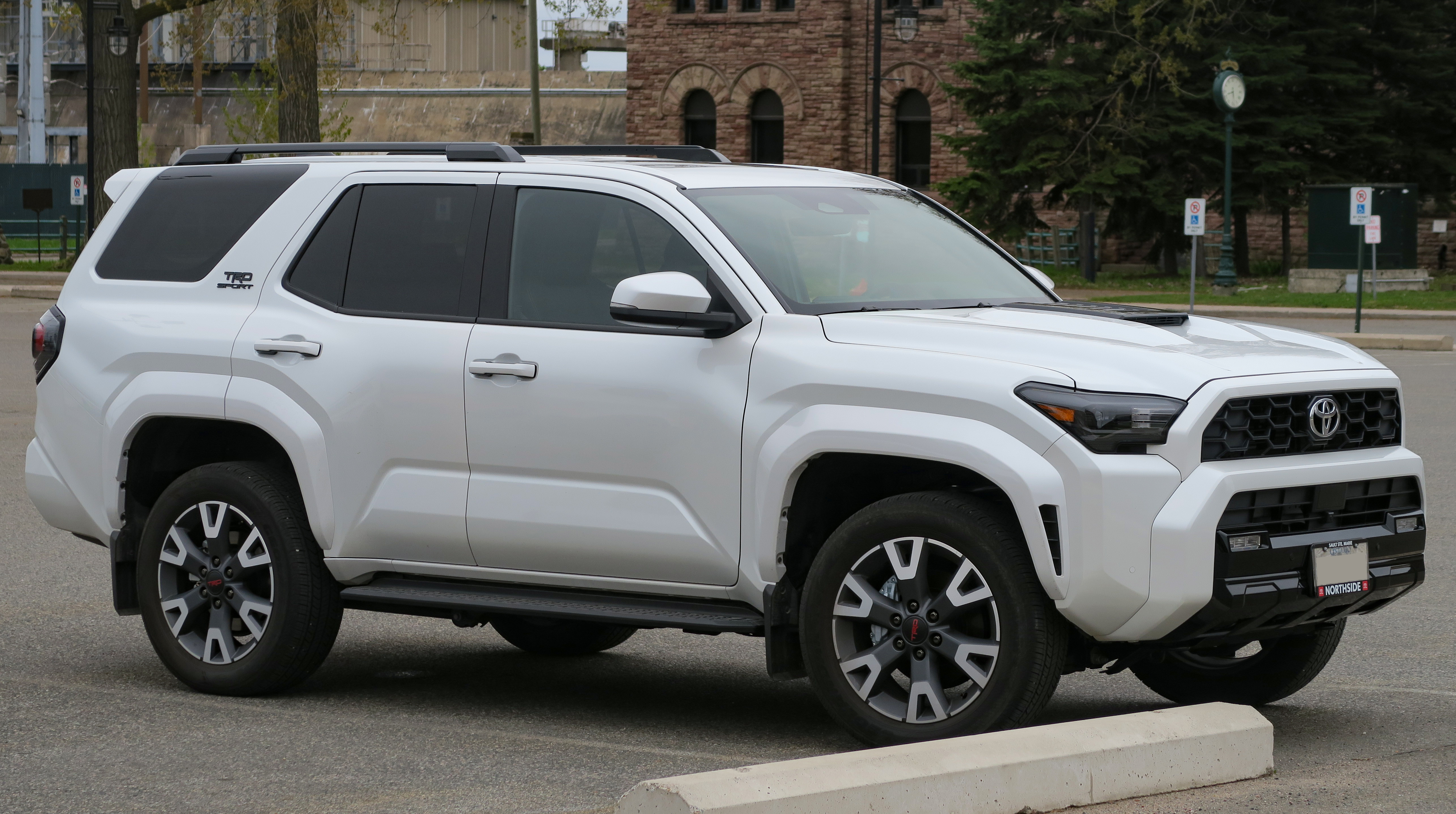
Toyota 4Runner

== TNGA-K (GA-K) ==
The TNGA-K platform underpins unibody vehicles in the D-segment or mid-size car, E-segment or full-size car, compact/mid-size crossover SUV, and large MPV categories. The platform is offered in both front-wheel drive and all-wheel drive variants and is paired with a transverse engine. The platform also supports a wheelbase length of 2,690–3,060 mm (105.9–120.5 in). The TNGA-K replaces the older K platform.

Vehicles using platform (calendar years):

- Toyota Camry — XV70 (2017–2023)
  - Daihatsu Altis — XV70 (2017–2024)
- Toyota Camry — XV80 (2024–present)
- Toyota Avalon — XX50 (2018–present)
- Toyota RAV4 — XA50 (2018–2025)
  - Toyota Wildlander — XA50 (2019–2025)
  - Suzuki Across — XA50 (2020–2026)
- Toyota RAV4 — XA60 (2025–present)
  - Toyota Wildlander — XA60 (2025–present)
  - Suzuki Across — XA60 (2026–present)
- Lexus ES — XZ10 (2018–2025)
- Lexus ES — XZ20 (2025–present)
- Toyota Highlander — XU70 (2019–present)
  - Toyota Crown Kluger — XU70 (2021–present)
  - Toyota Kluger — XU70 (2021–present)
- Toyota Highlander BEV — (2026–present)
  - Subaru Getaway — (2026–present)
- Toyota Harrier — XU80 (2020–present)
  - Toyota Venza — XU80 (2020–2026)
- Toyota Sienna — XL40 (2020–present)
  - Toyota Granvia — XL40 (2022–present)
- Lexus NX — AZ20 (2021–present)
- Lexus RX — ALA10/ALH10 (2022–present)
- Toyota Crown Crossover — S235 (2022–present)
- Toyota Crown Sport — S236 (2023–present)
- Toyota Crown Estate/Signia — S238 (2024–present)
- Toyota Grand Highlander — AS10 (2023–present)
- Lexus LM — AW10 (2023–present)
- Lexus TX — AU10 (2023–present)
- Lexus TZ — (2026–present)
- Toyota Alphard — AH40 (2023–present)
  - Toyota Crown Vellfire — AH40 (2023–present)
  - Toyota Vellfire — AH40 (2023–present)
- Toyota Century SUV — G70 (2023–present)
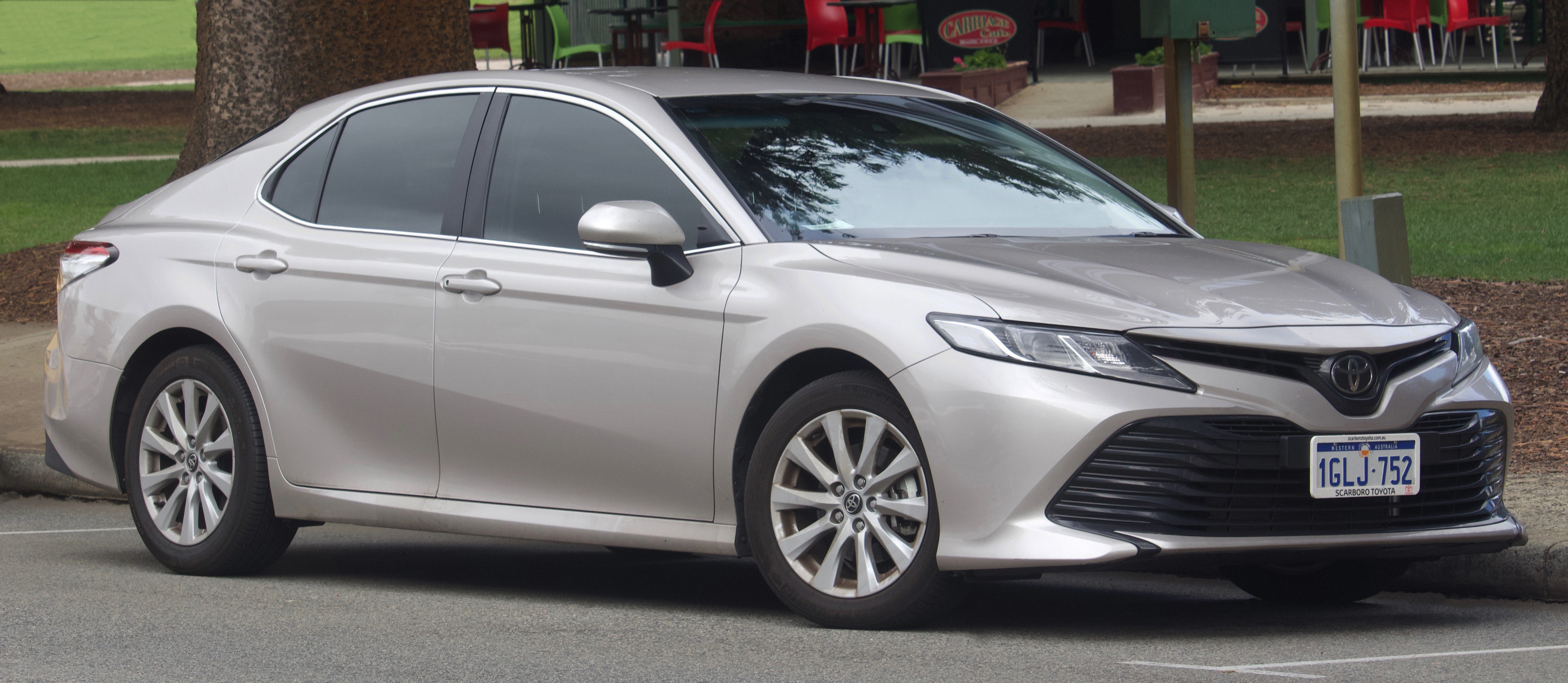
Toyota Camry (XV70)

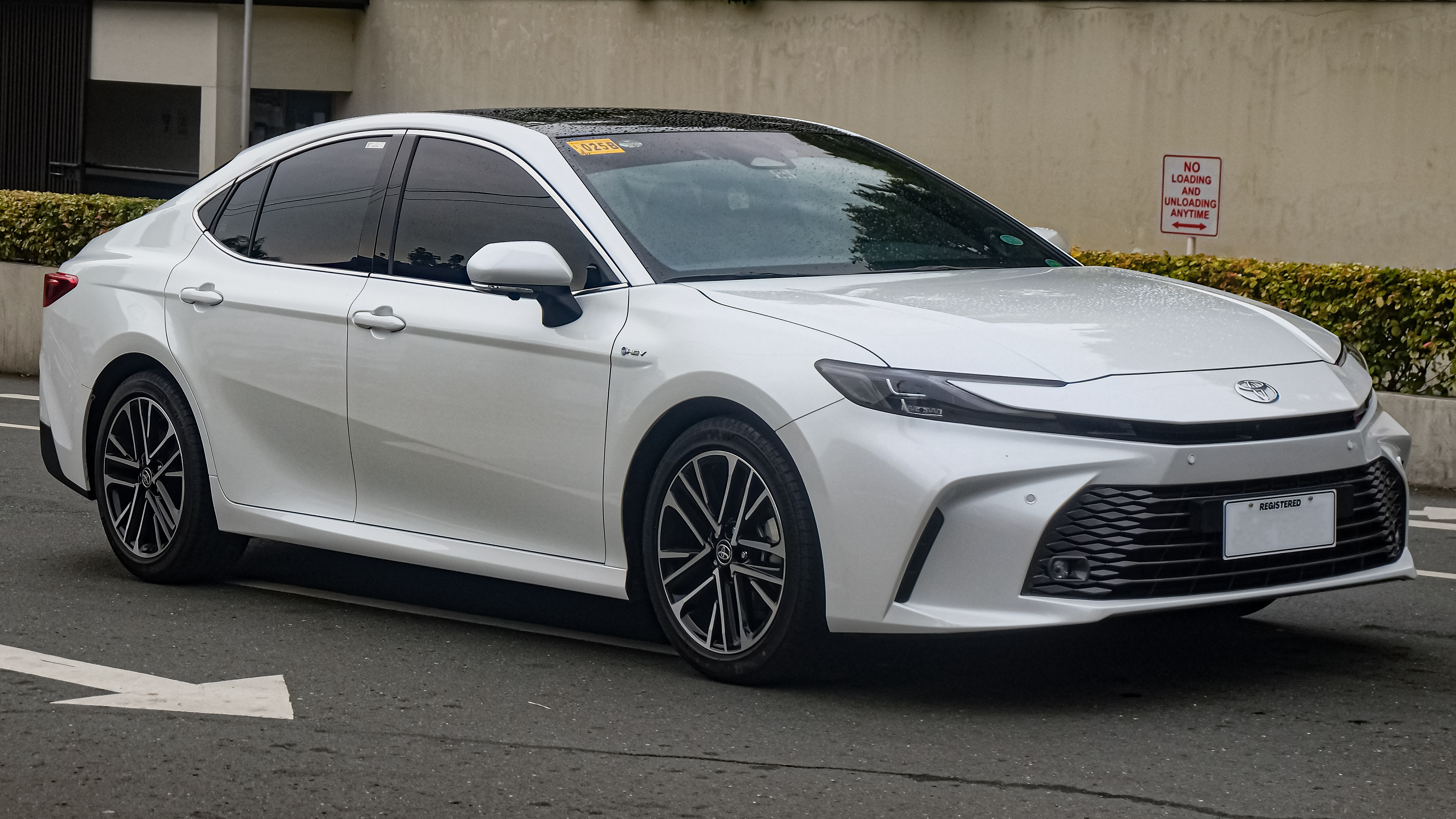
Toyota Camry (XV80)

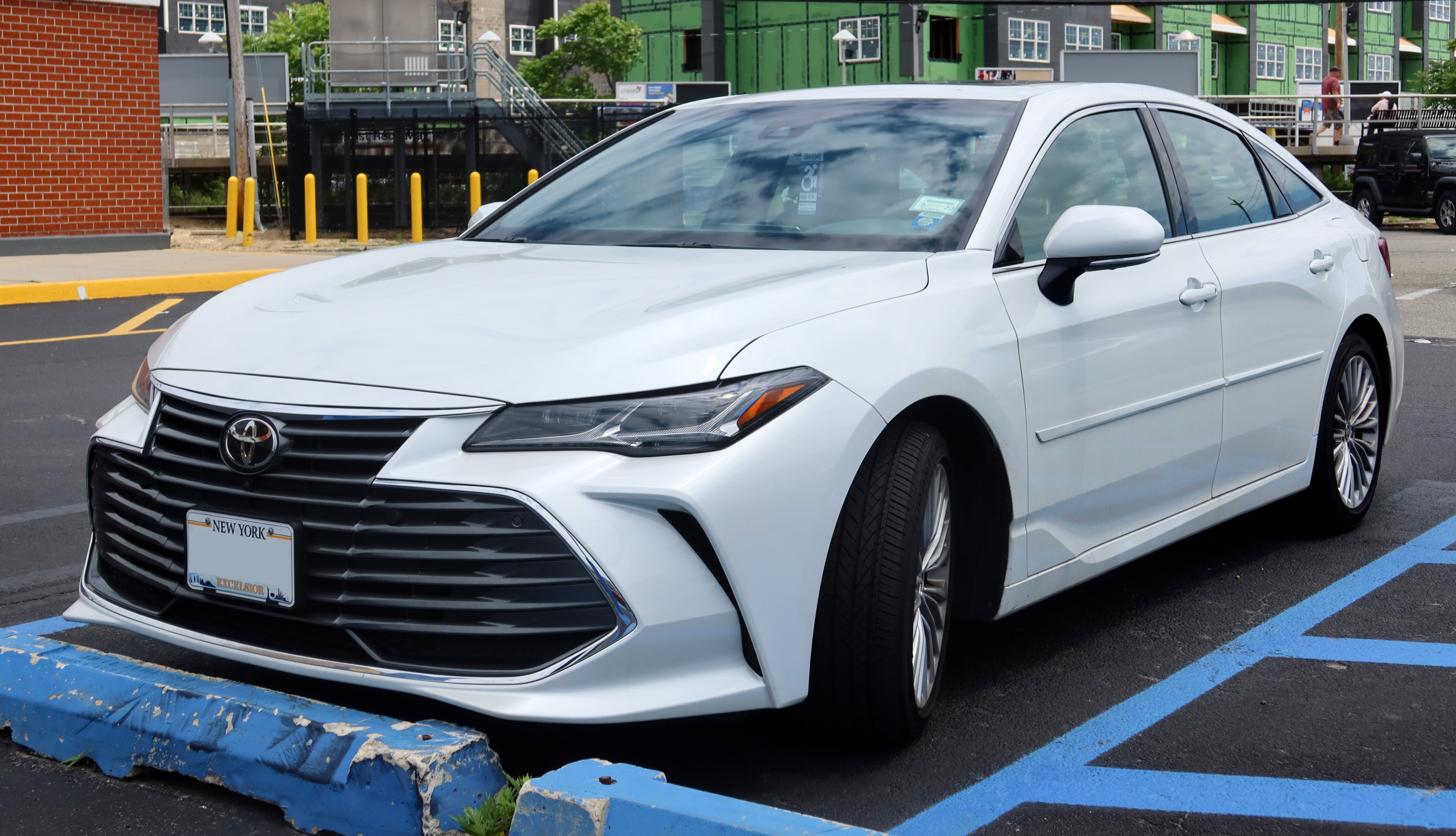
Toyota Avalon (XX50)

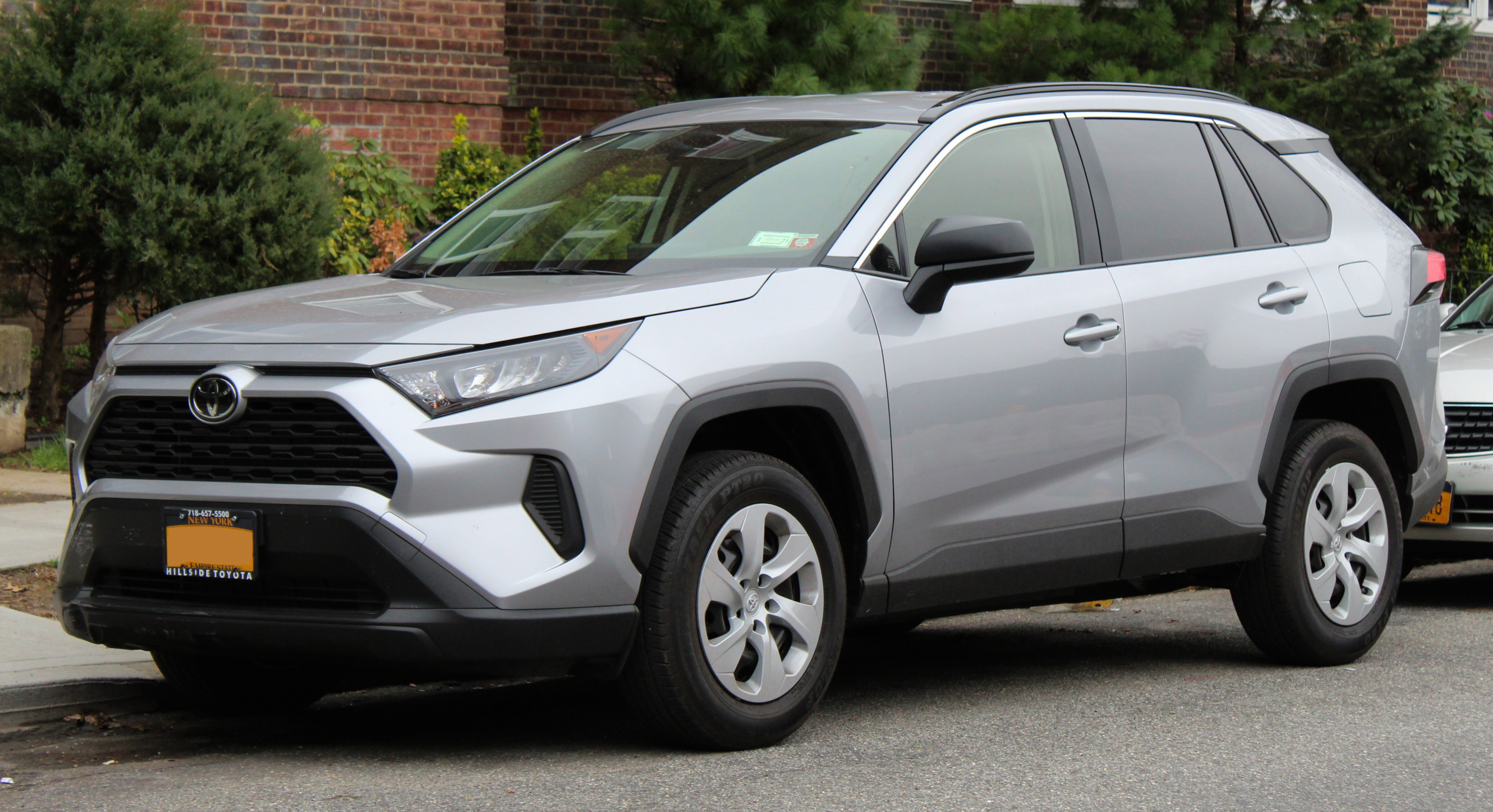
Toyota RAV4 (XA50)

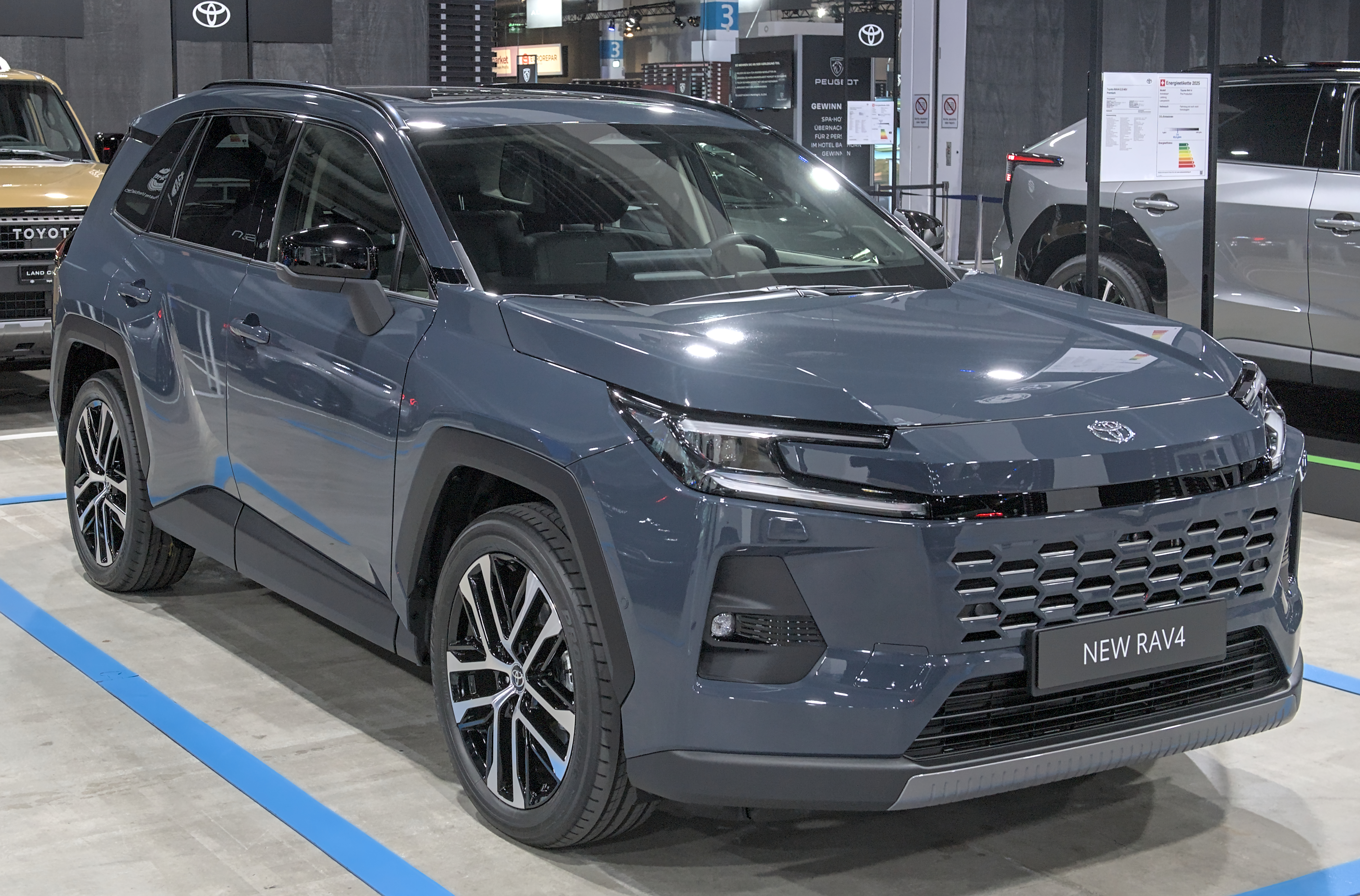
Toyota RAV4 (XA60)

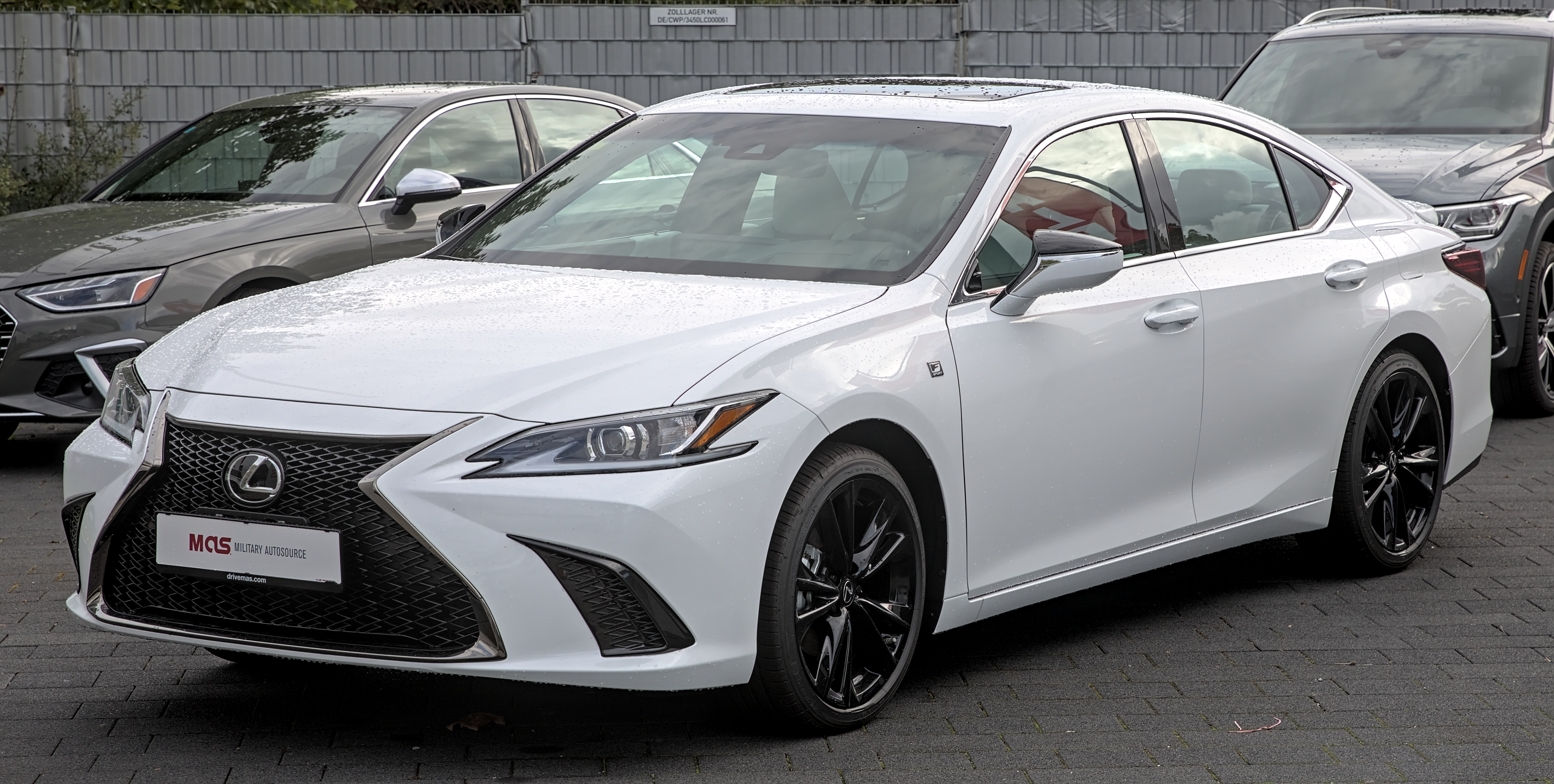
Lexus ES (XZ10)

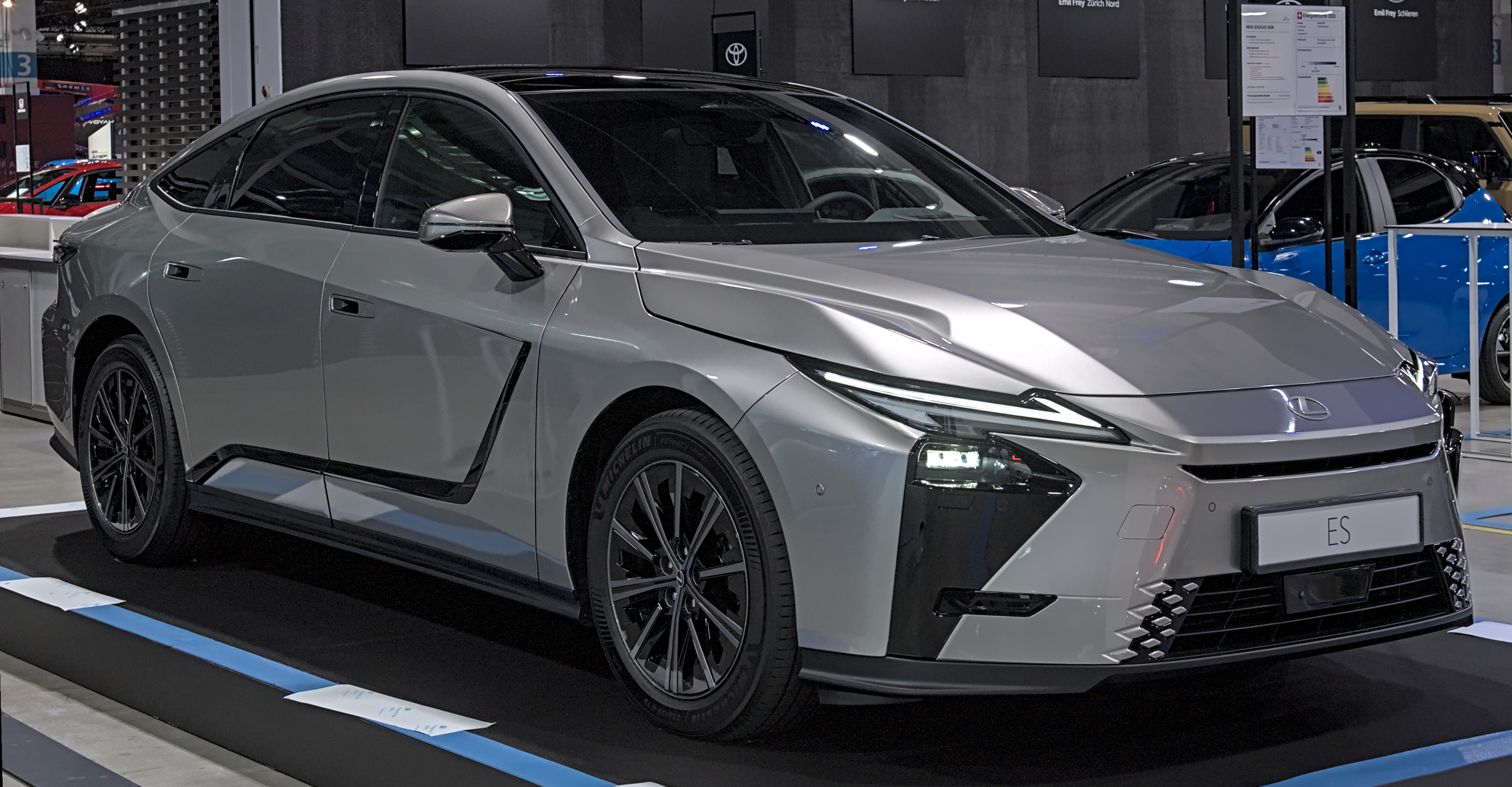
Lexus ES (XZ20)

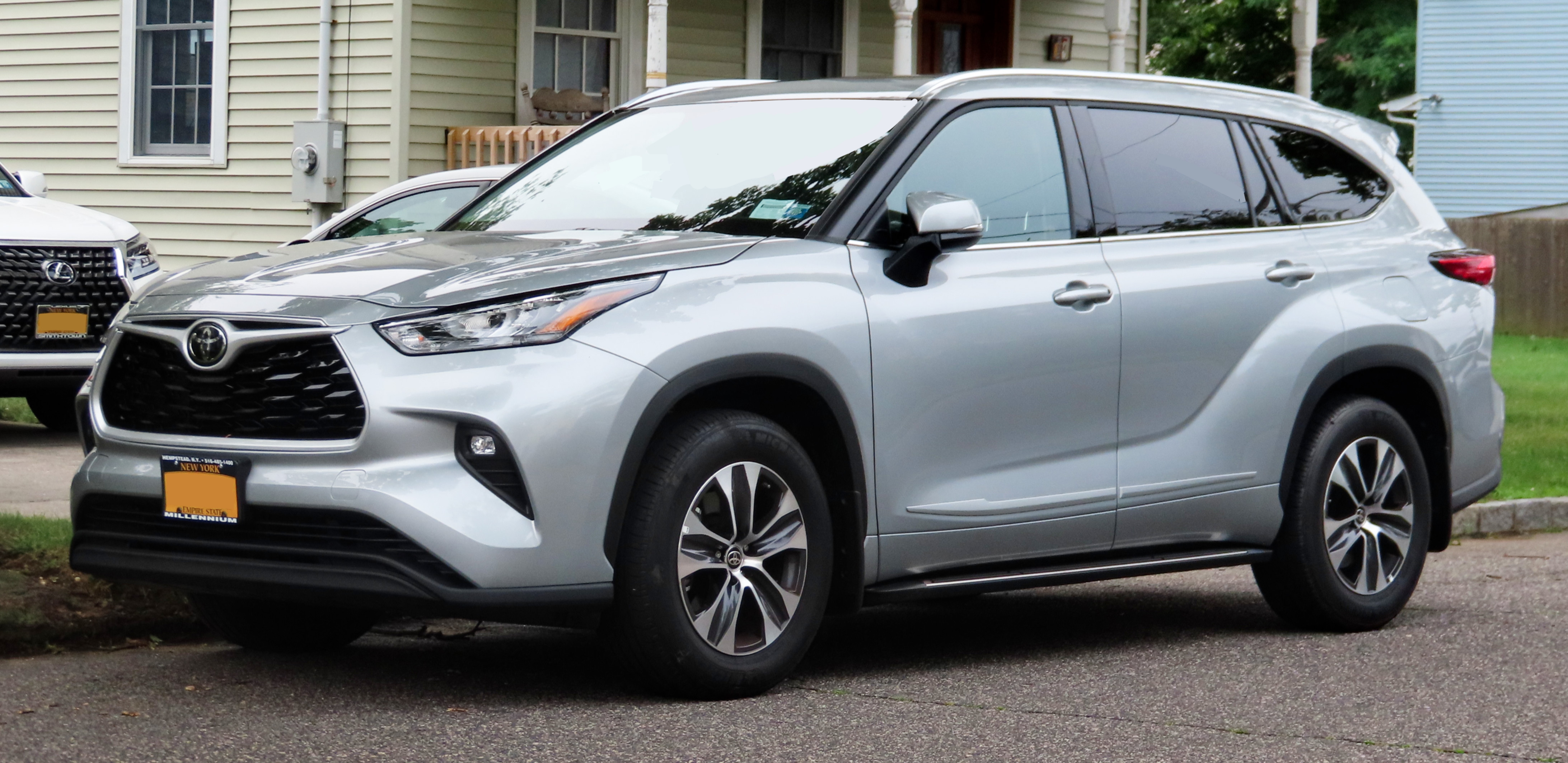
Toyota Highlander (XU70)

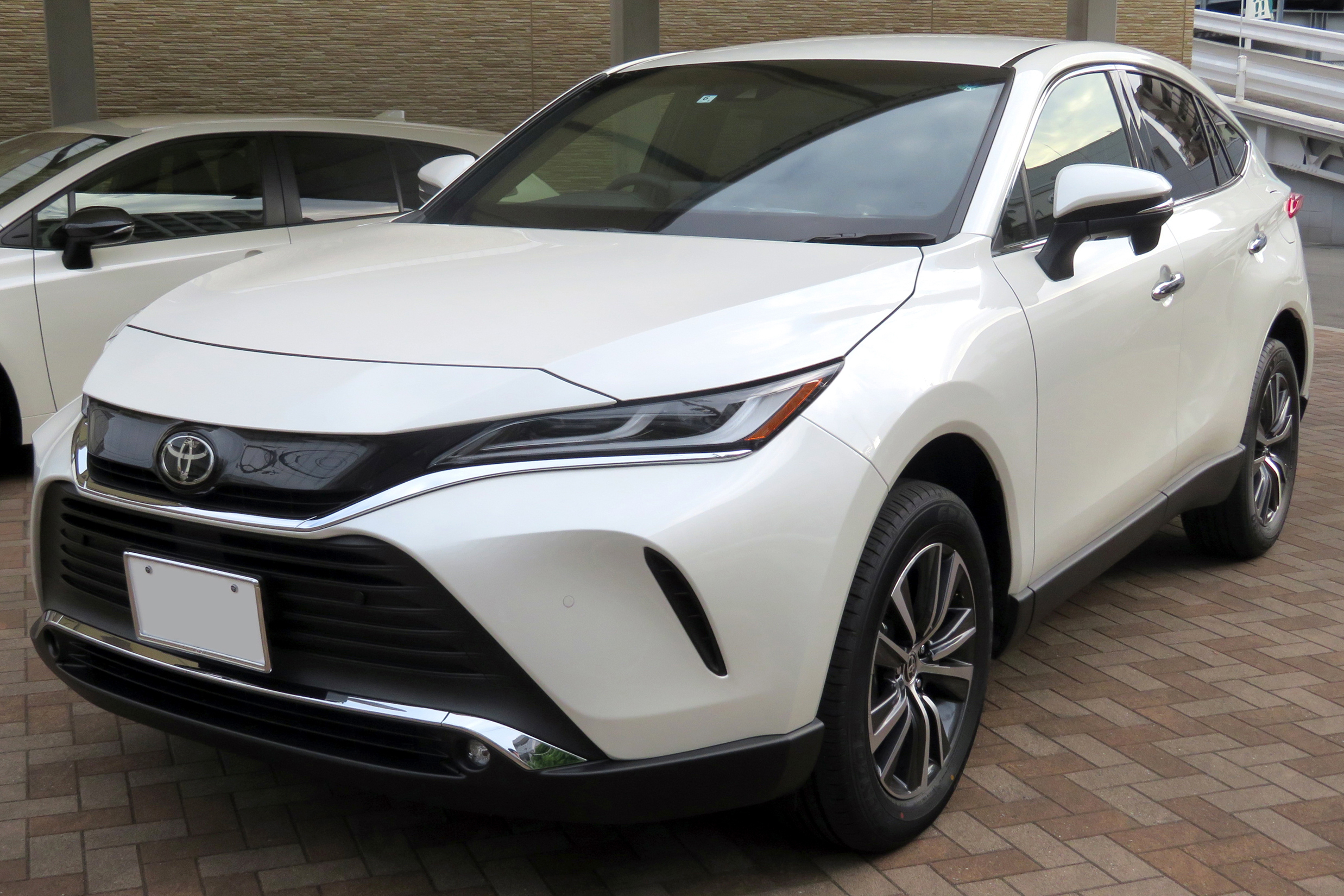
Toyota Harrier (XU80)

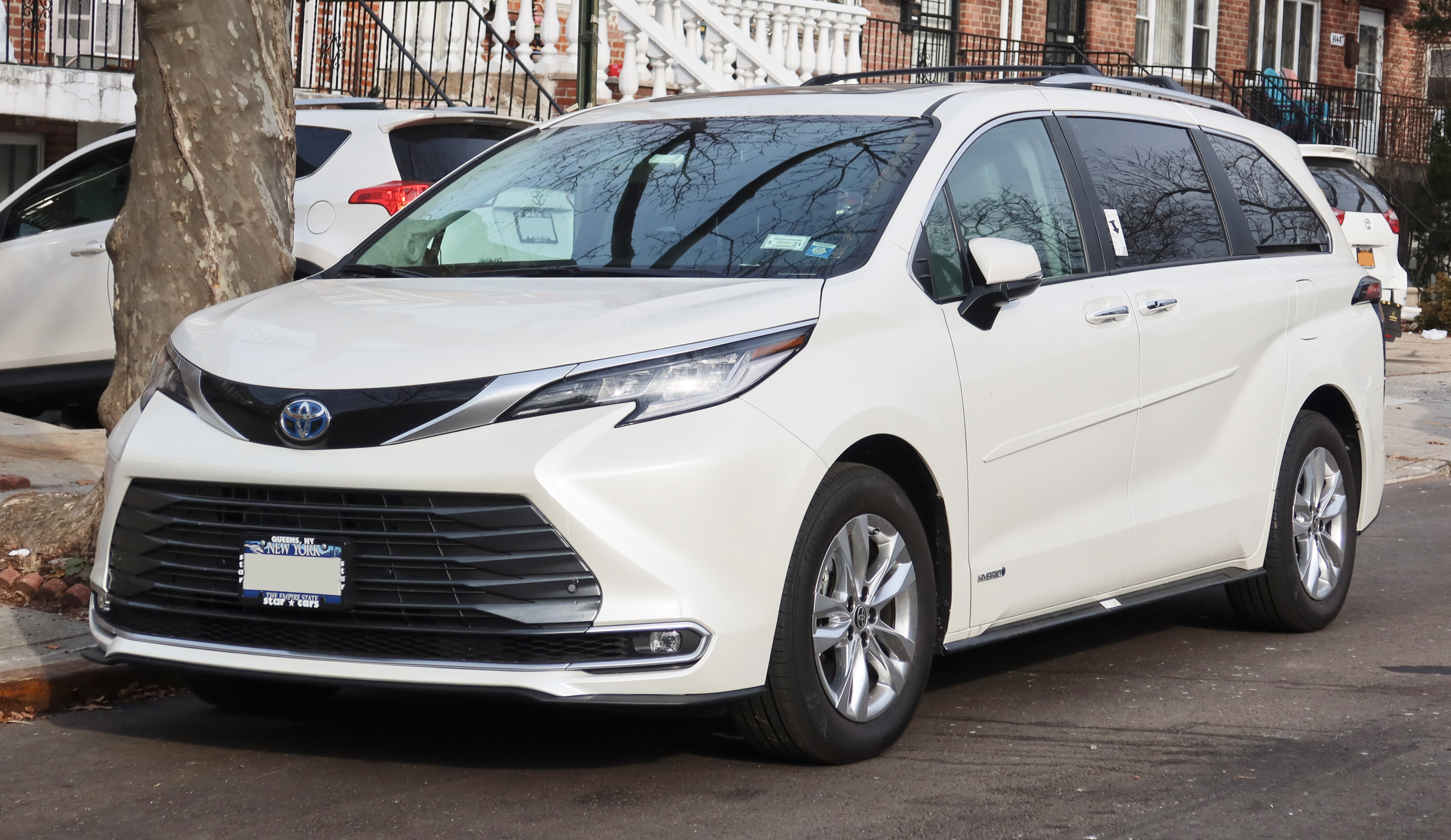
Toyota Sienna (XL40)

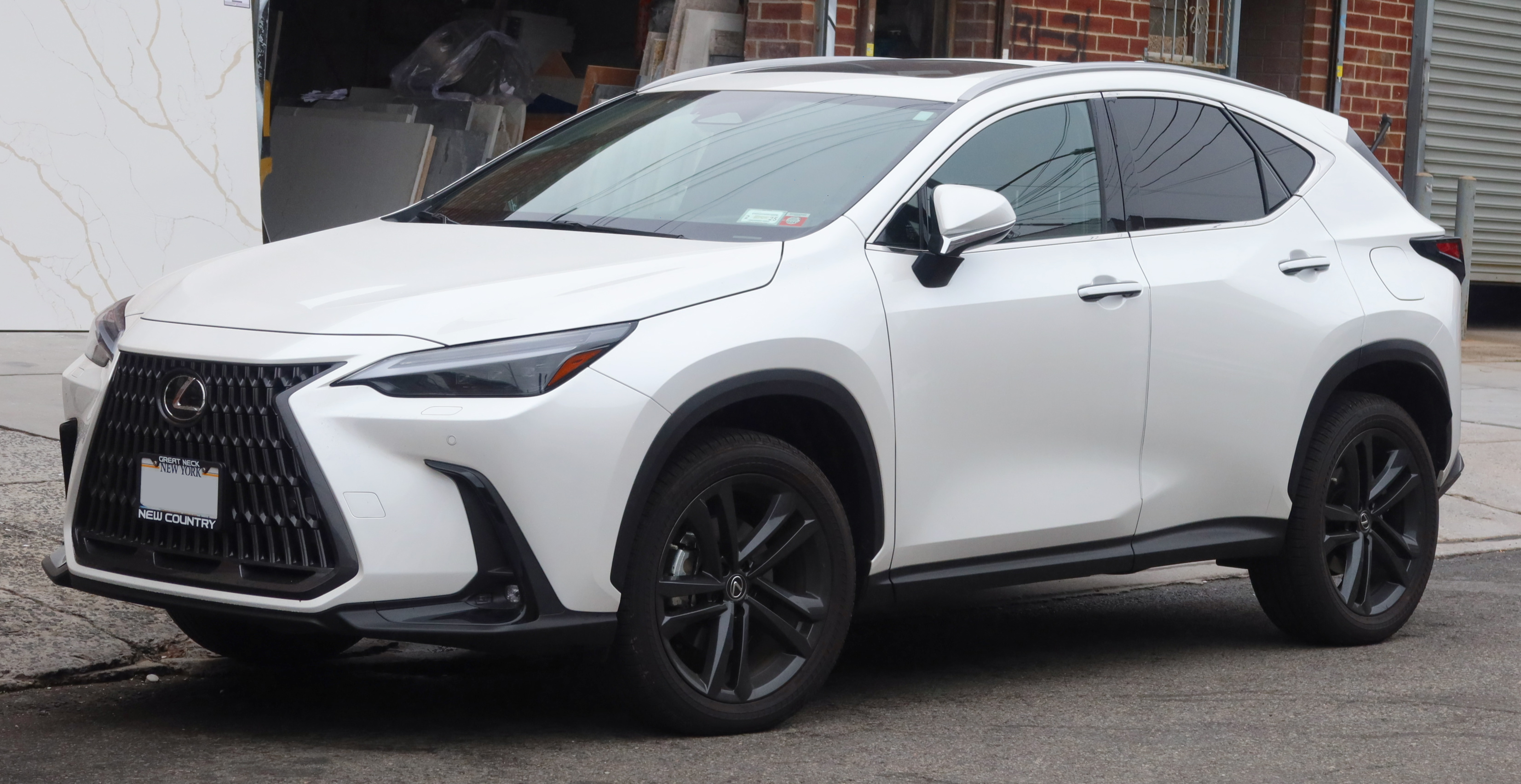
Lexus NX (AZ20)

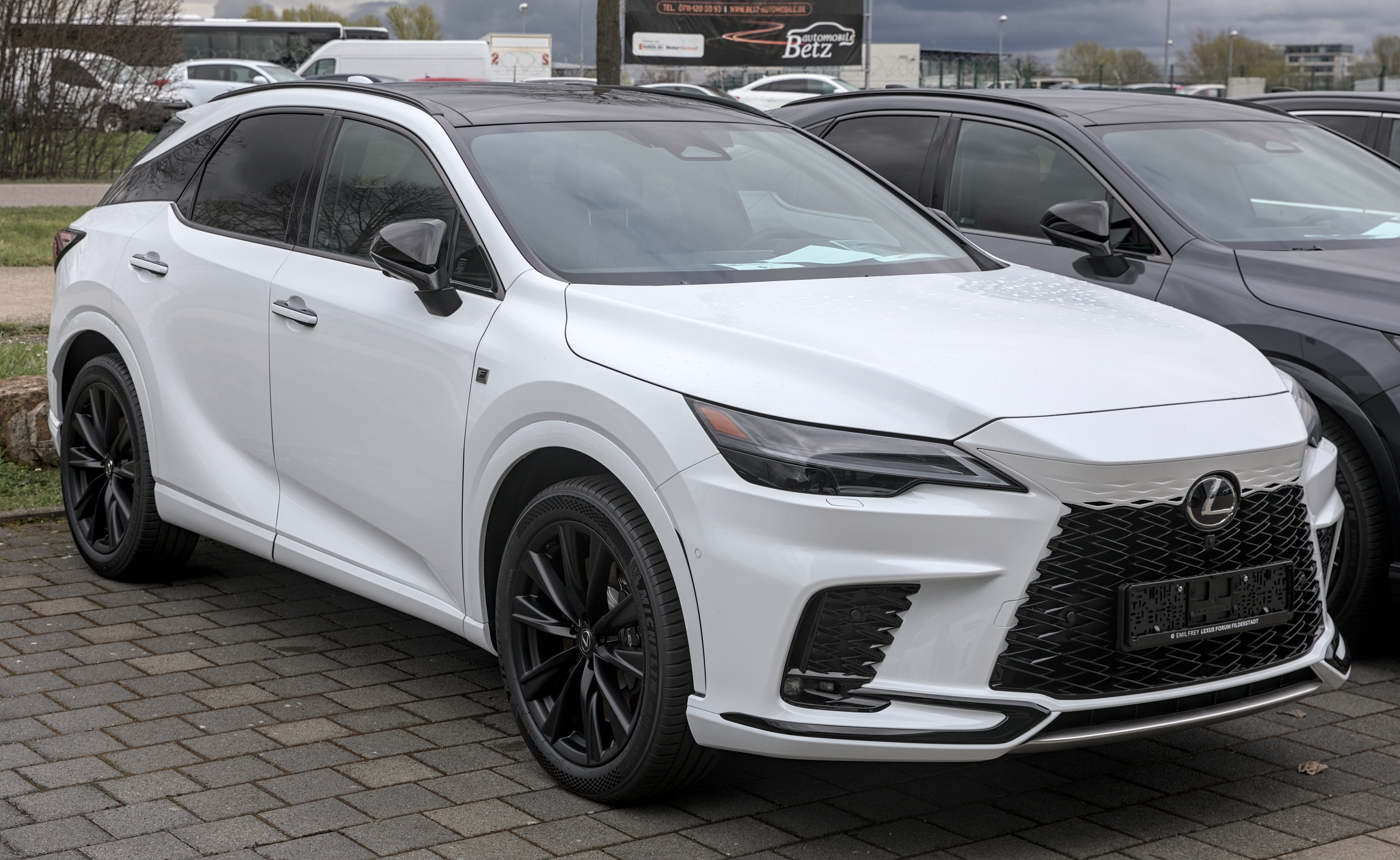
Lexus RX

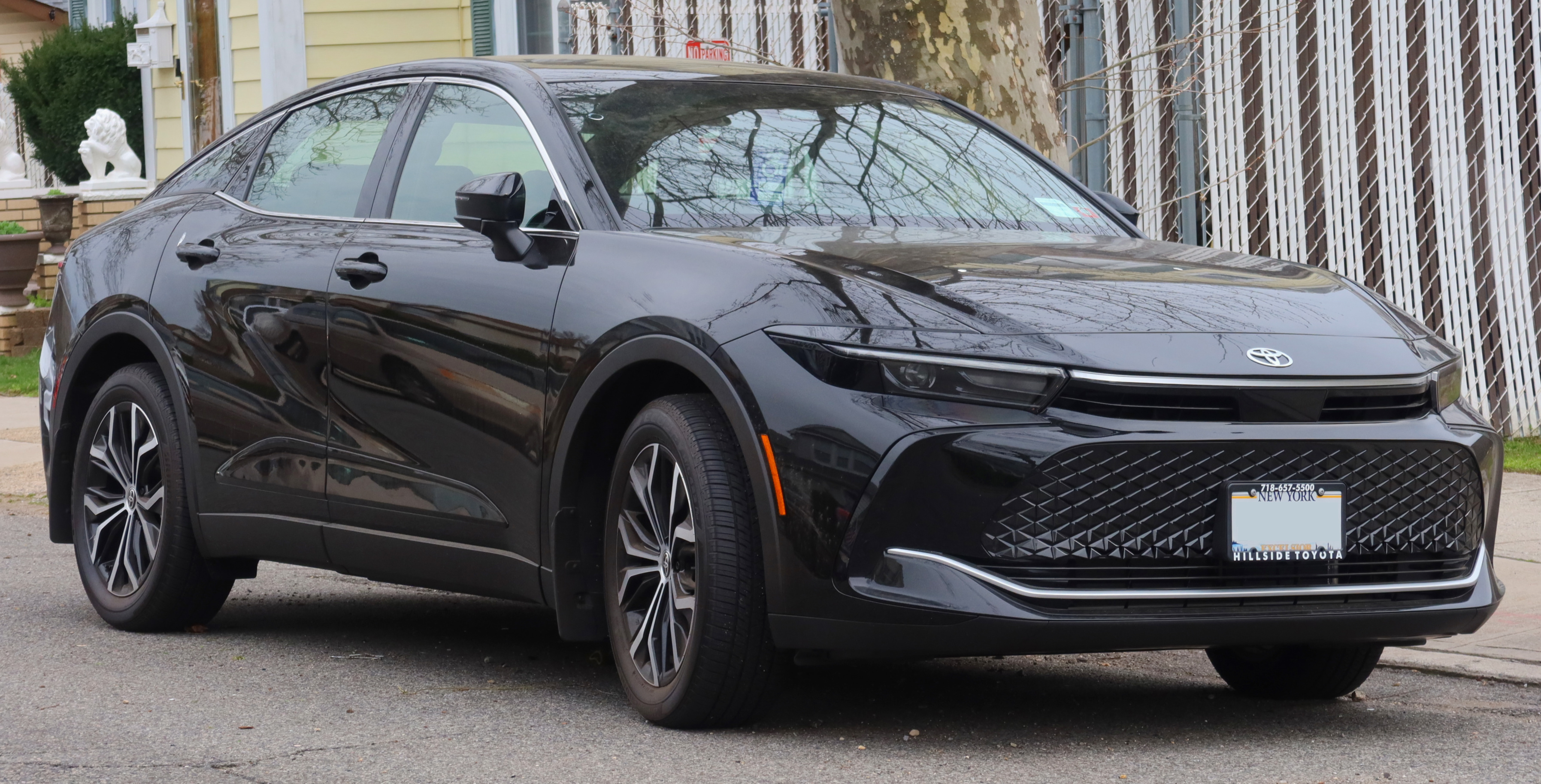
Toyota Crown Crossover (S235)

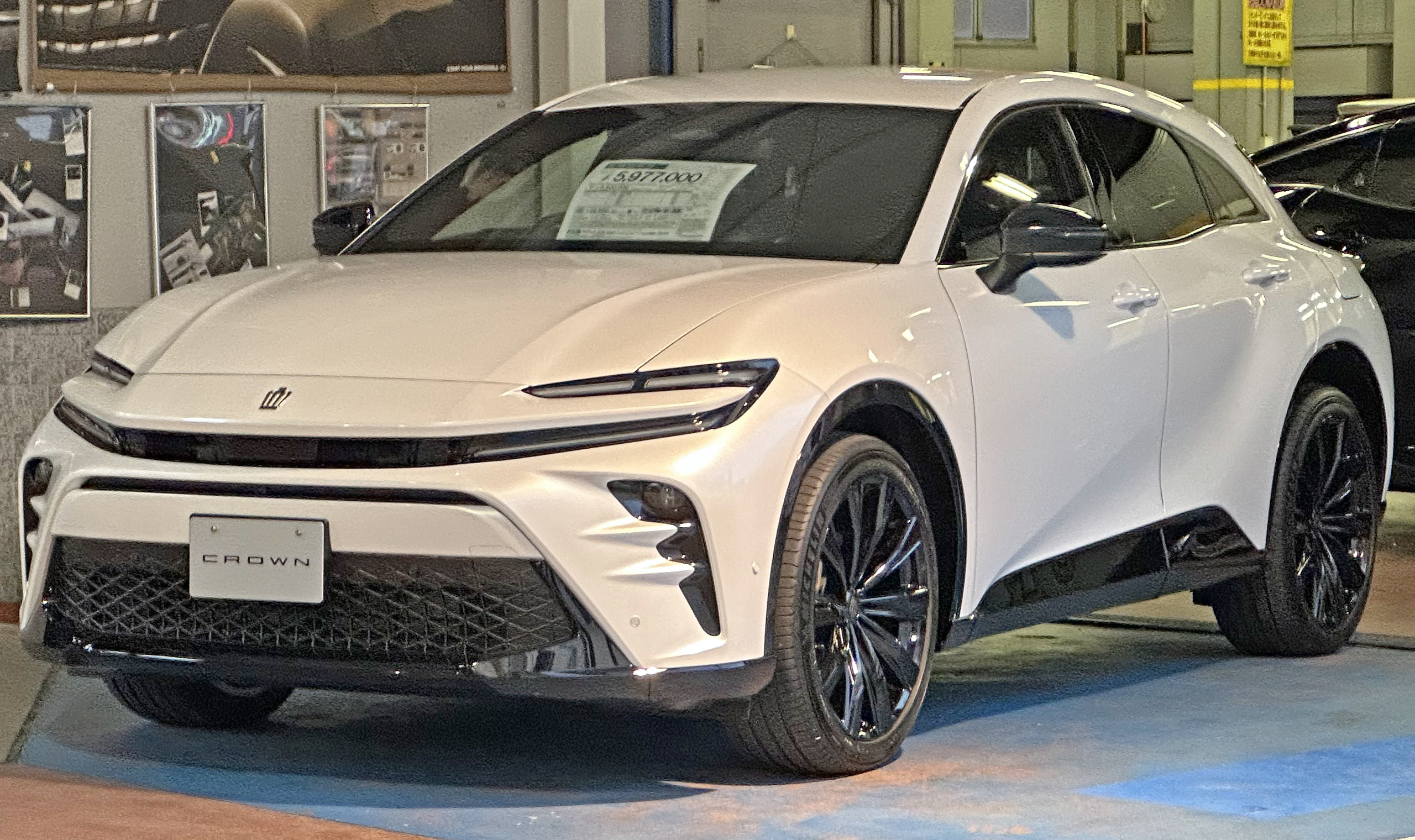
Toyota Crown Sport (S235)

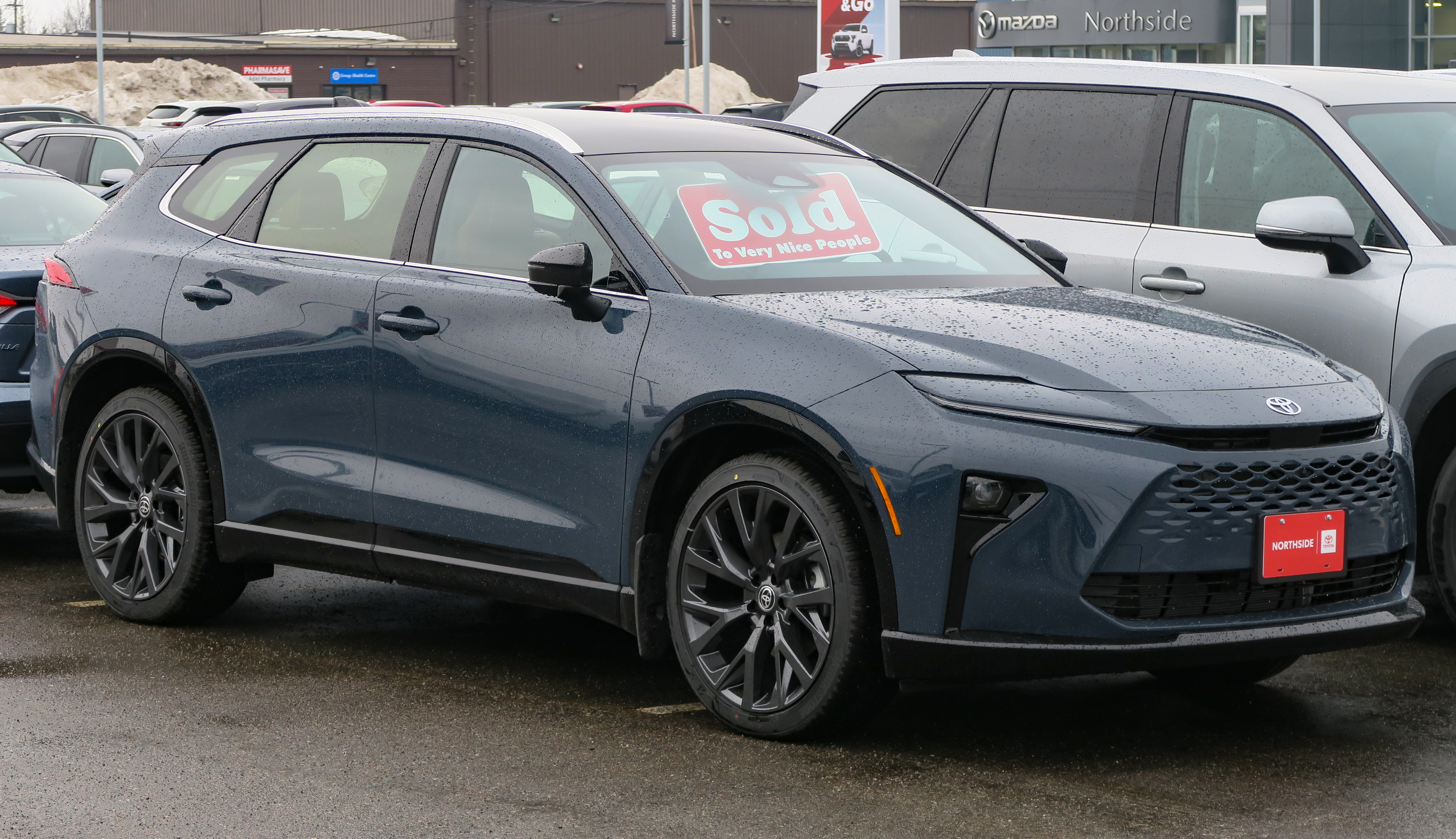
Toyota Crown Estate/Signia (S235)

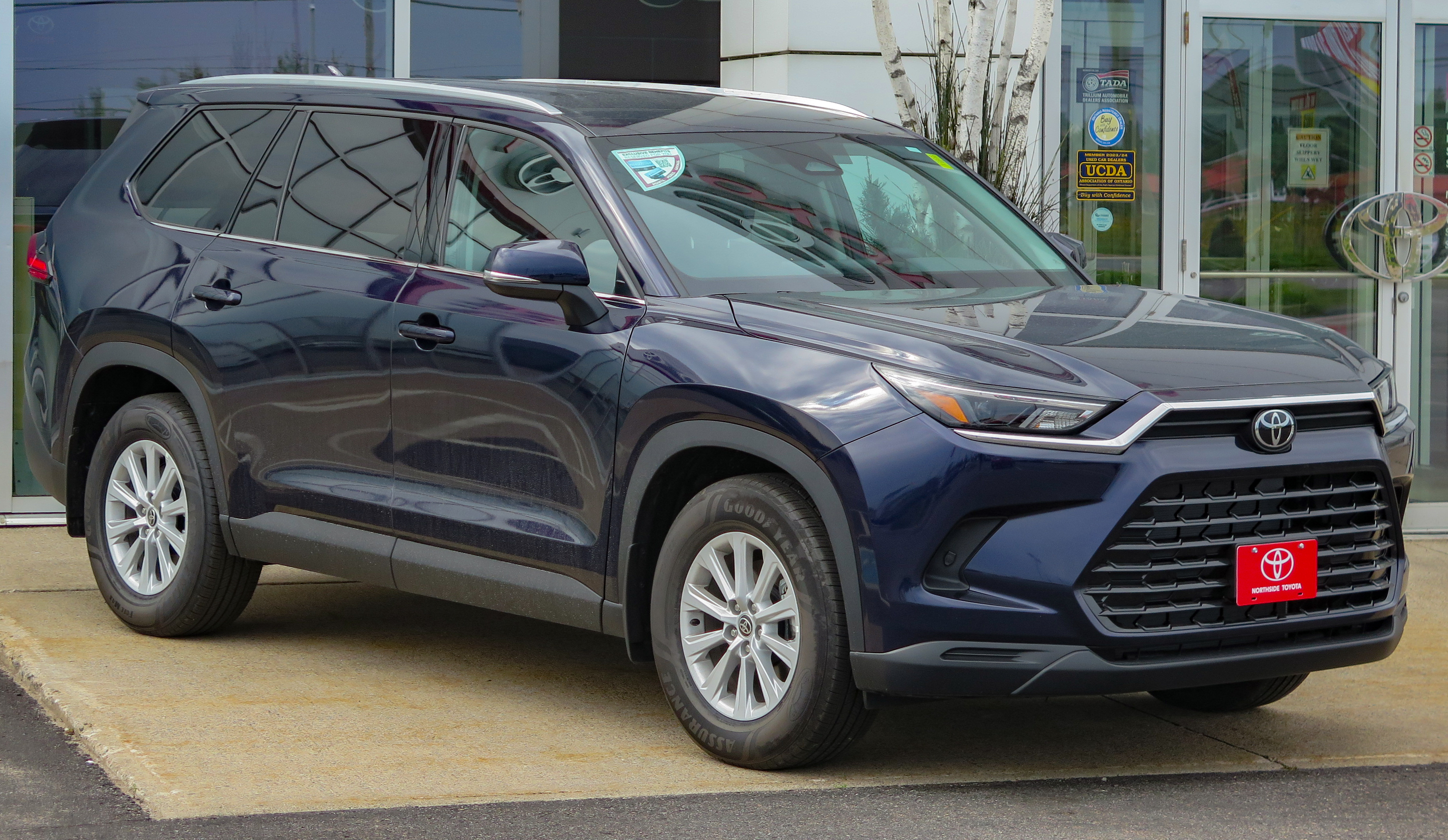
Toyota Grand Highlander (AS10)

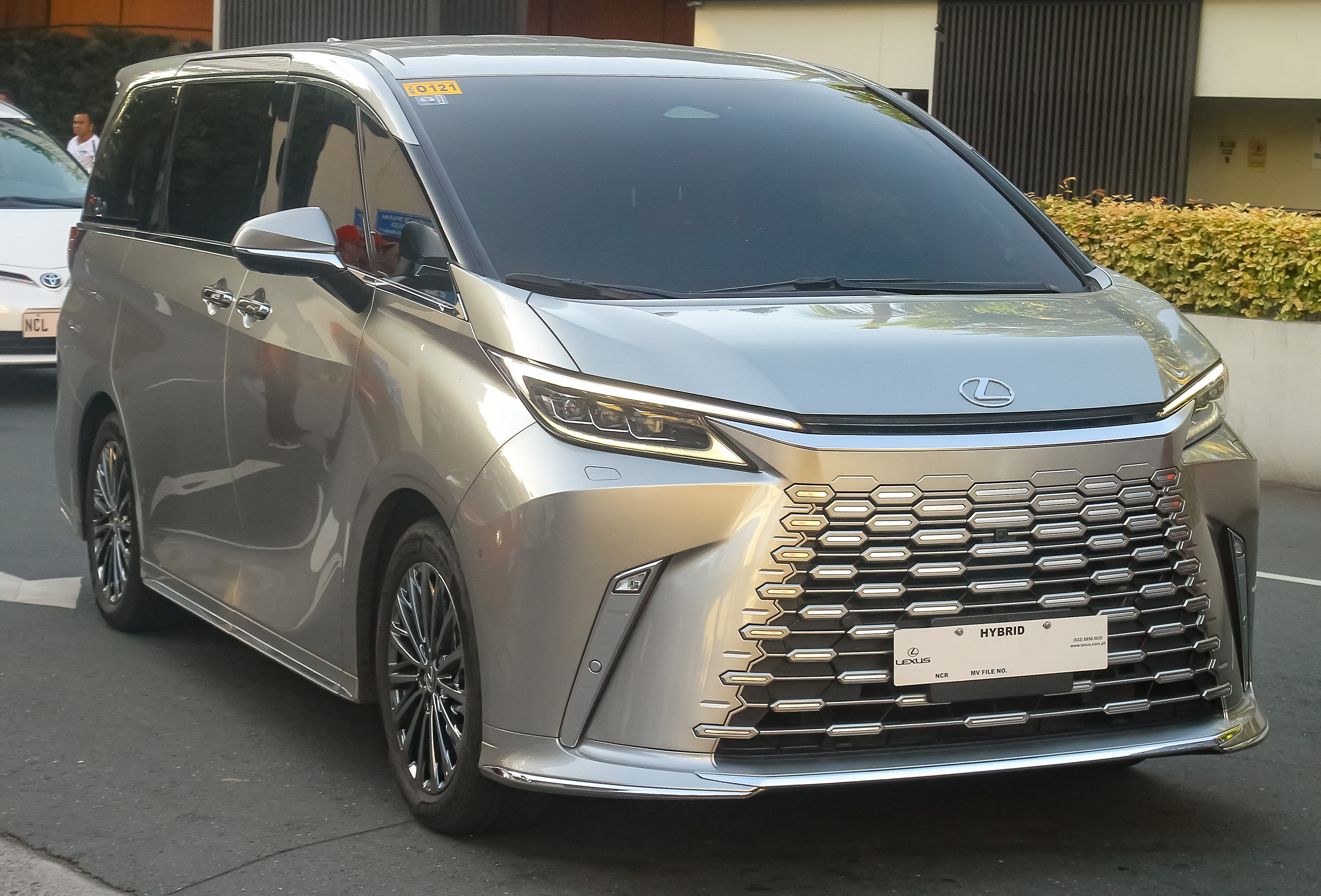
Lexus LM (AW10)

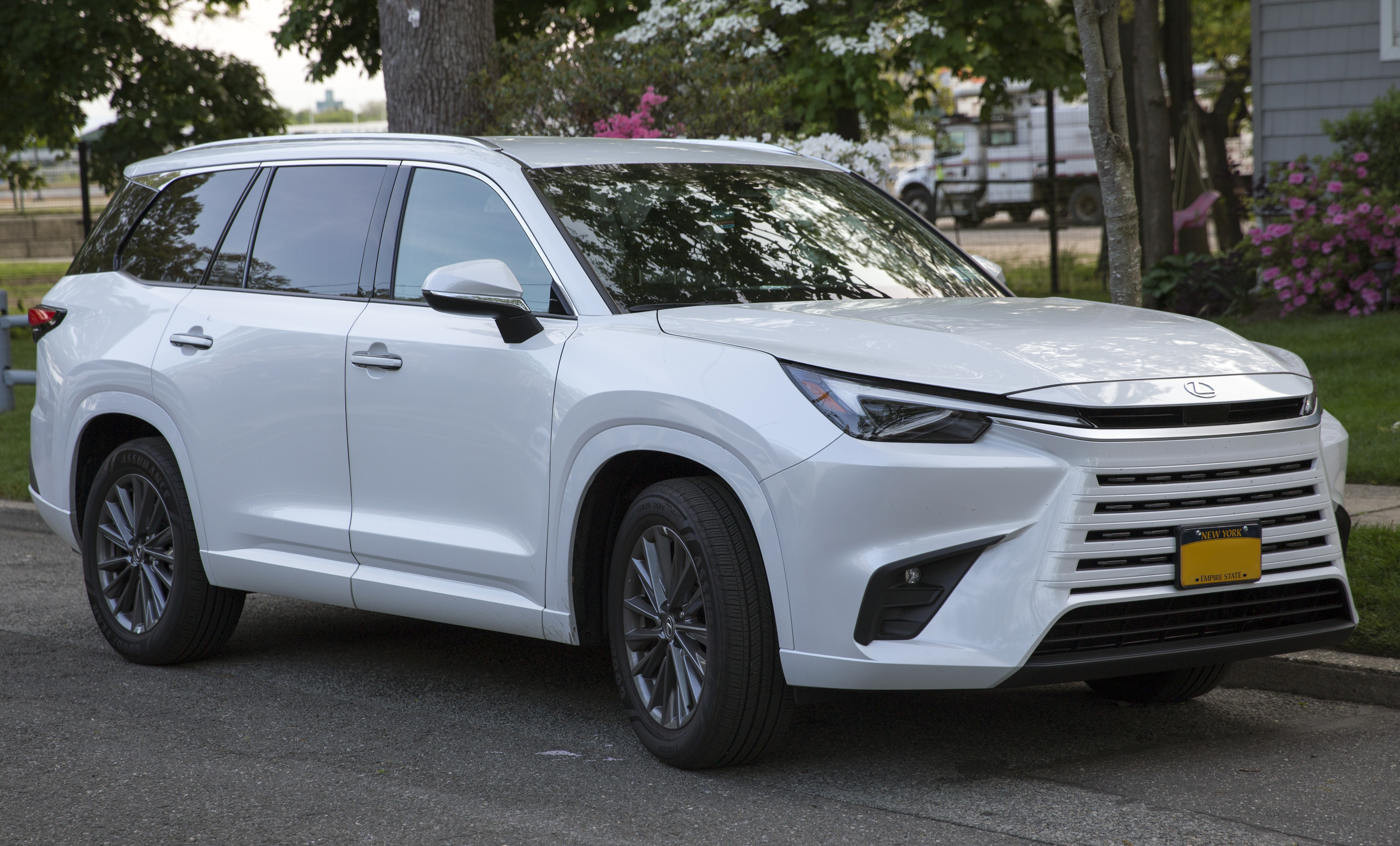
Lexus TX (AU10)

Lexus TZ

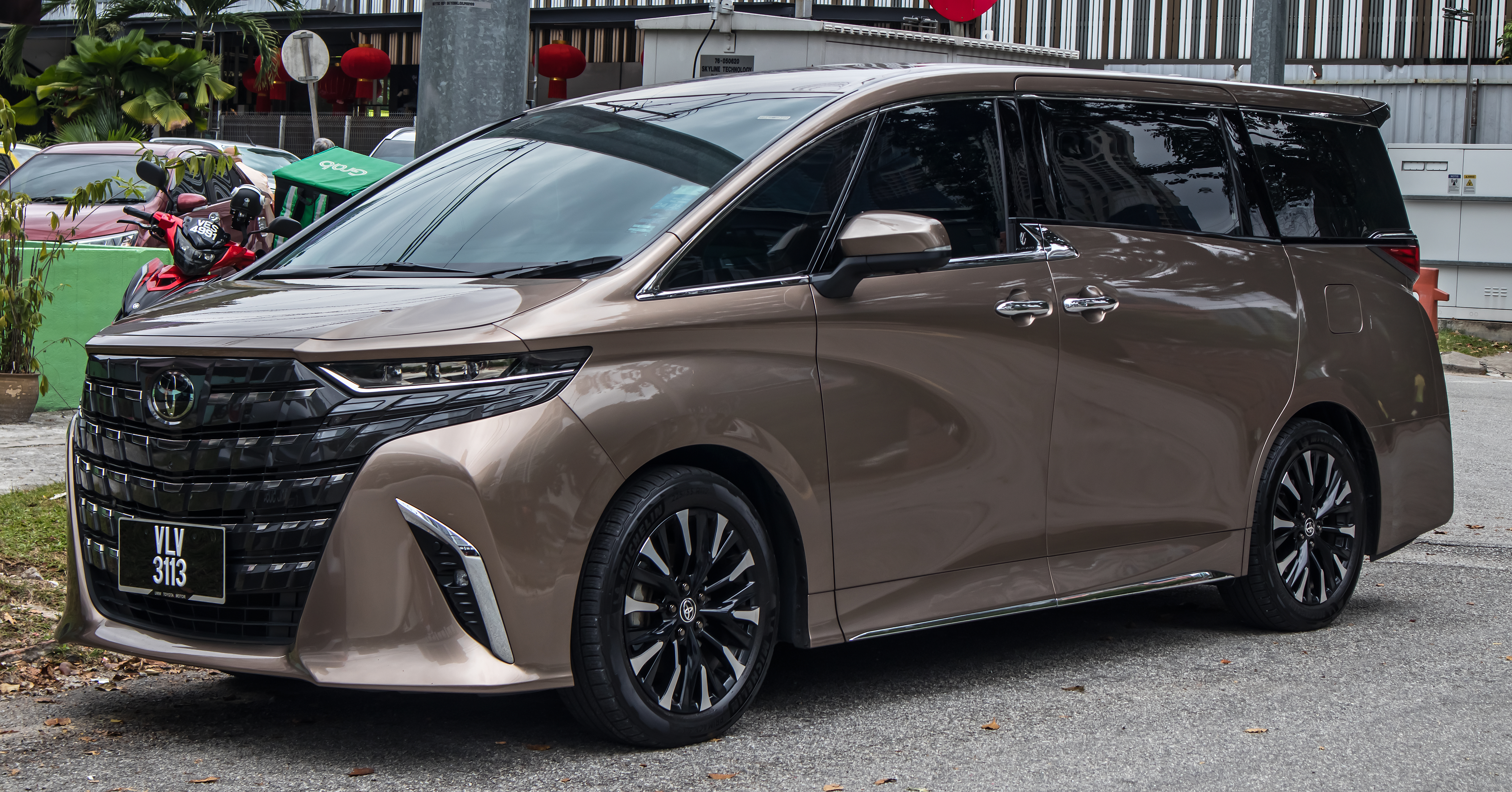
Toyota Alphard (AH40)

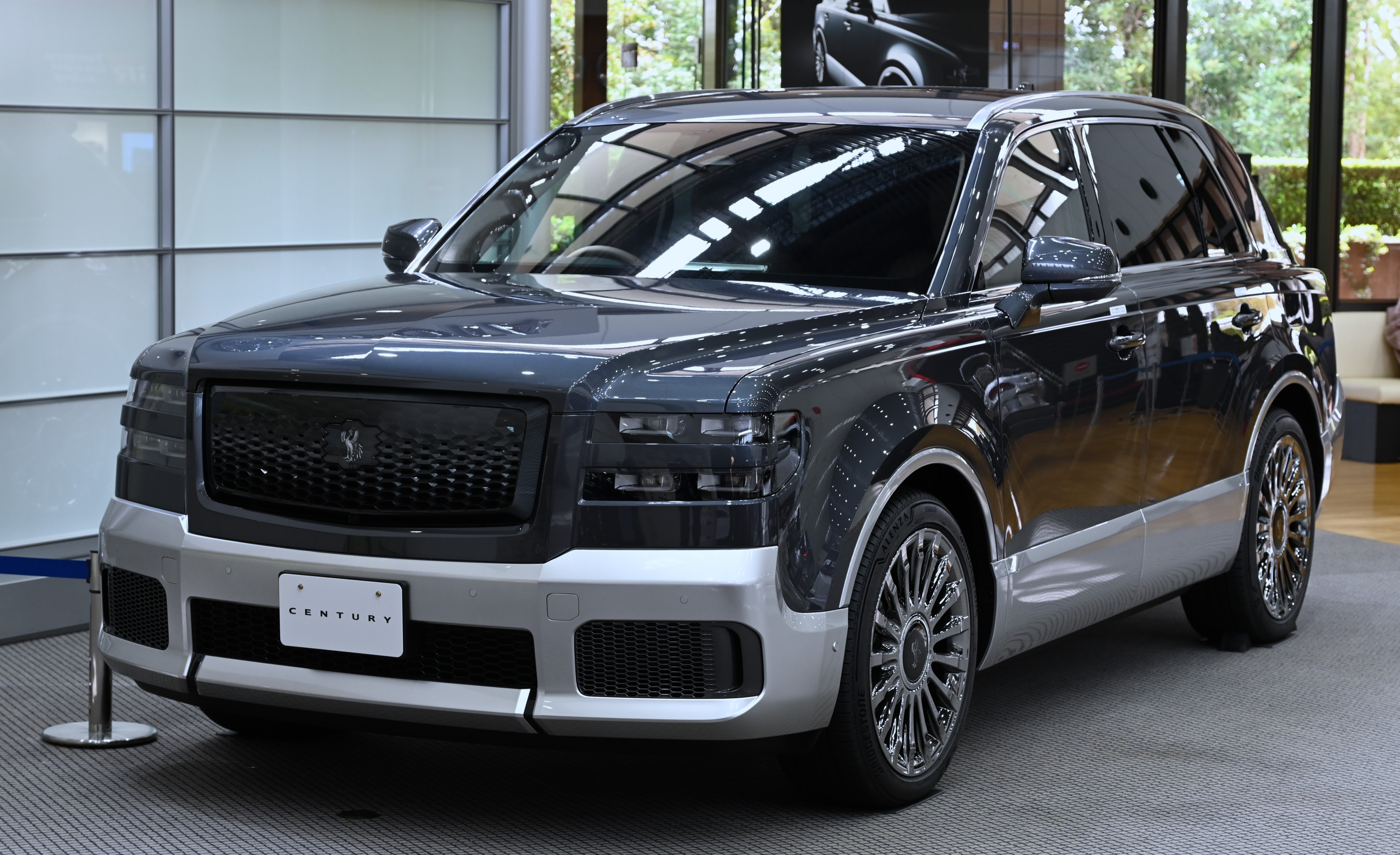
Toyota Century SUV (G70)

== TNGA-L (GA-L) ==
The TNGA-L platform underpins unibody vehicles in the E-segment or executive car, F-segment or full-size luxury car, and S-segment or grand tourer categories. The platform is offered in both rear-wheel drive and all-wheel drive variants and is paired with a longitudinal engine. The platform also supports a wheelbase length of 2,870–3,125 mm (113.0–123.0 in). The Crown was also produced with a narrow version at 1,800 mm (70.9 in) wide. The TNGA-L replaces the older N platform.

Vehicles using platform (calendar years):

- Lexus LC — Z100 (2017–2026)
- Lexus LS — XF50 (2017–present)
- Toyota Crown — S220 (2018–2022)
- Toyota Crown Sedan — S230 (2023–present)
- Toyota Mirai — JPD20 (2020–present)
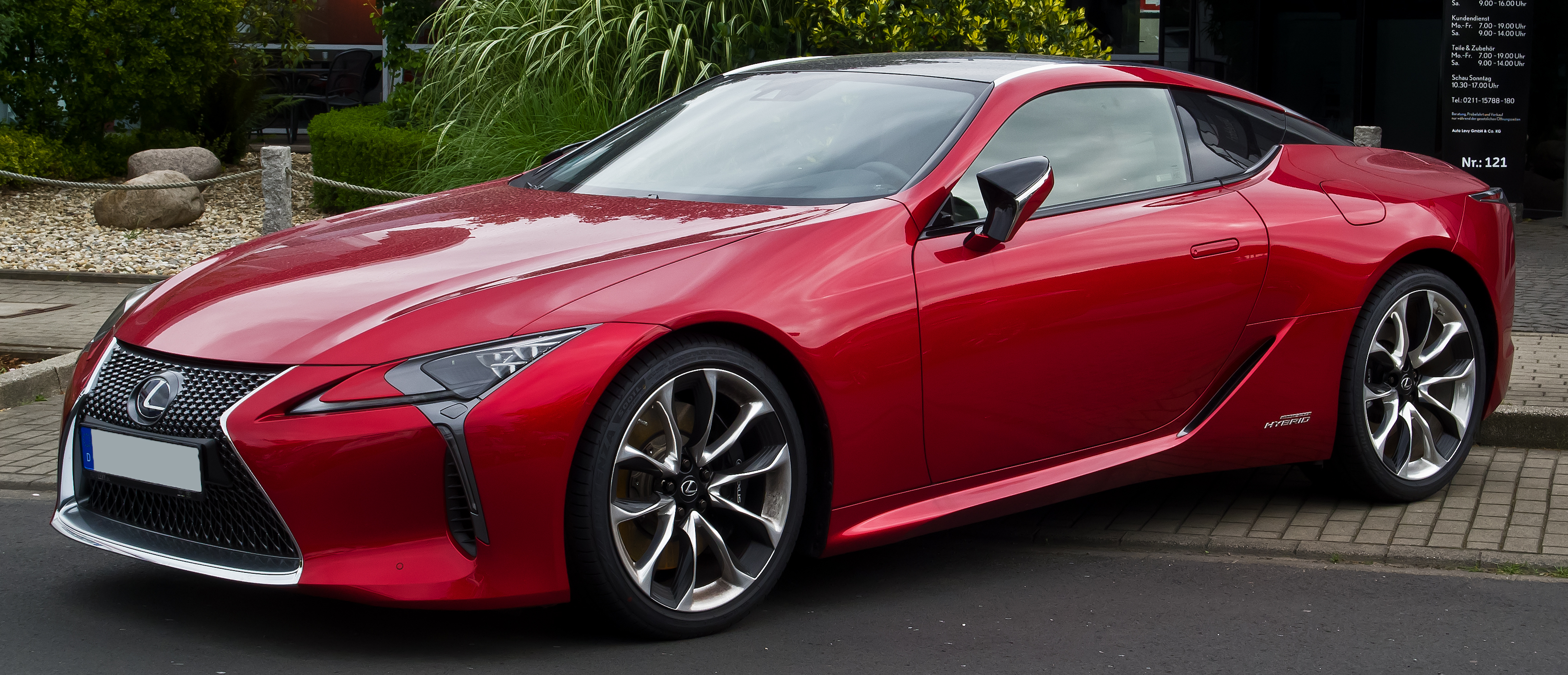
Lexus LC

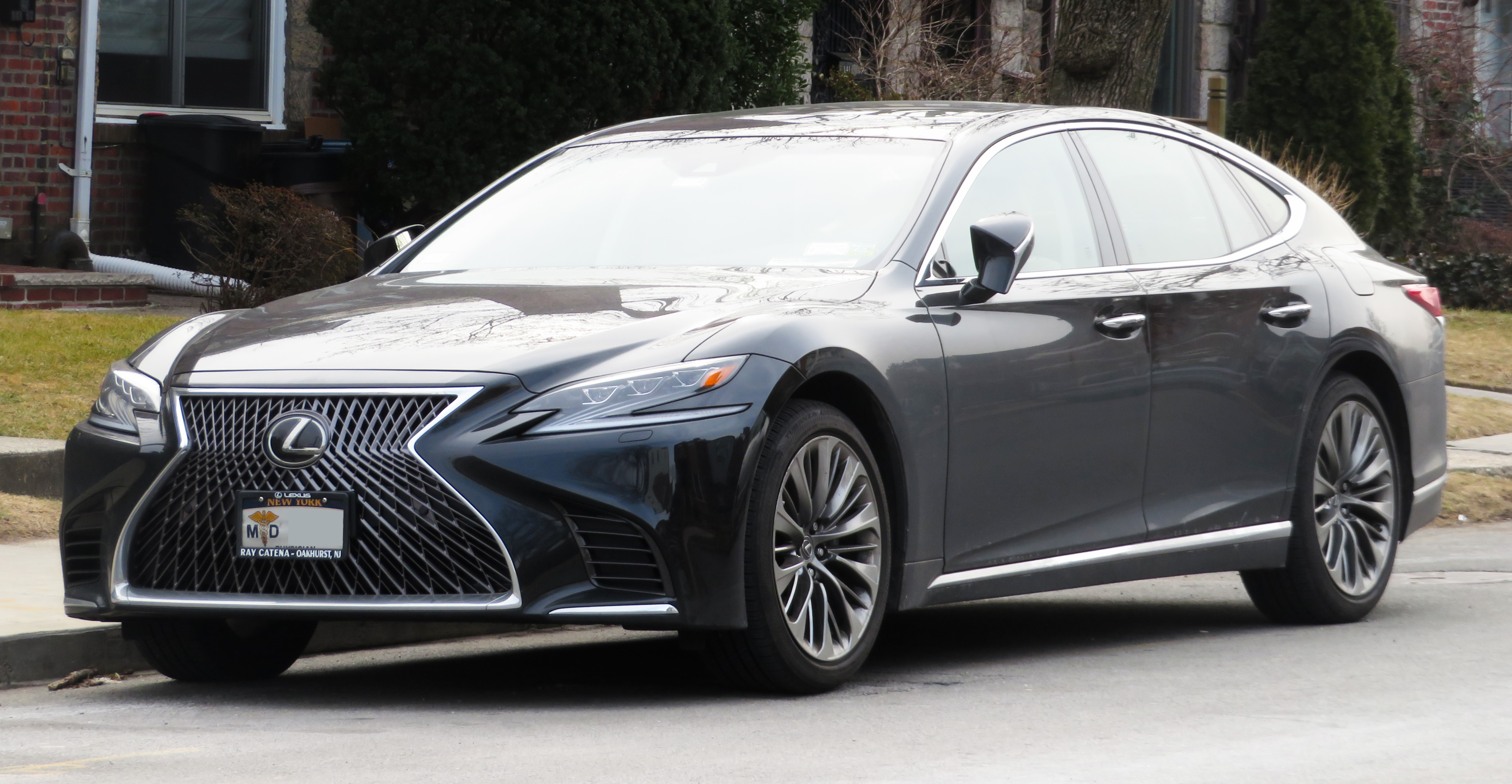
Lexus LS

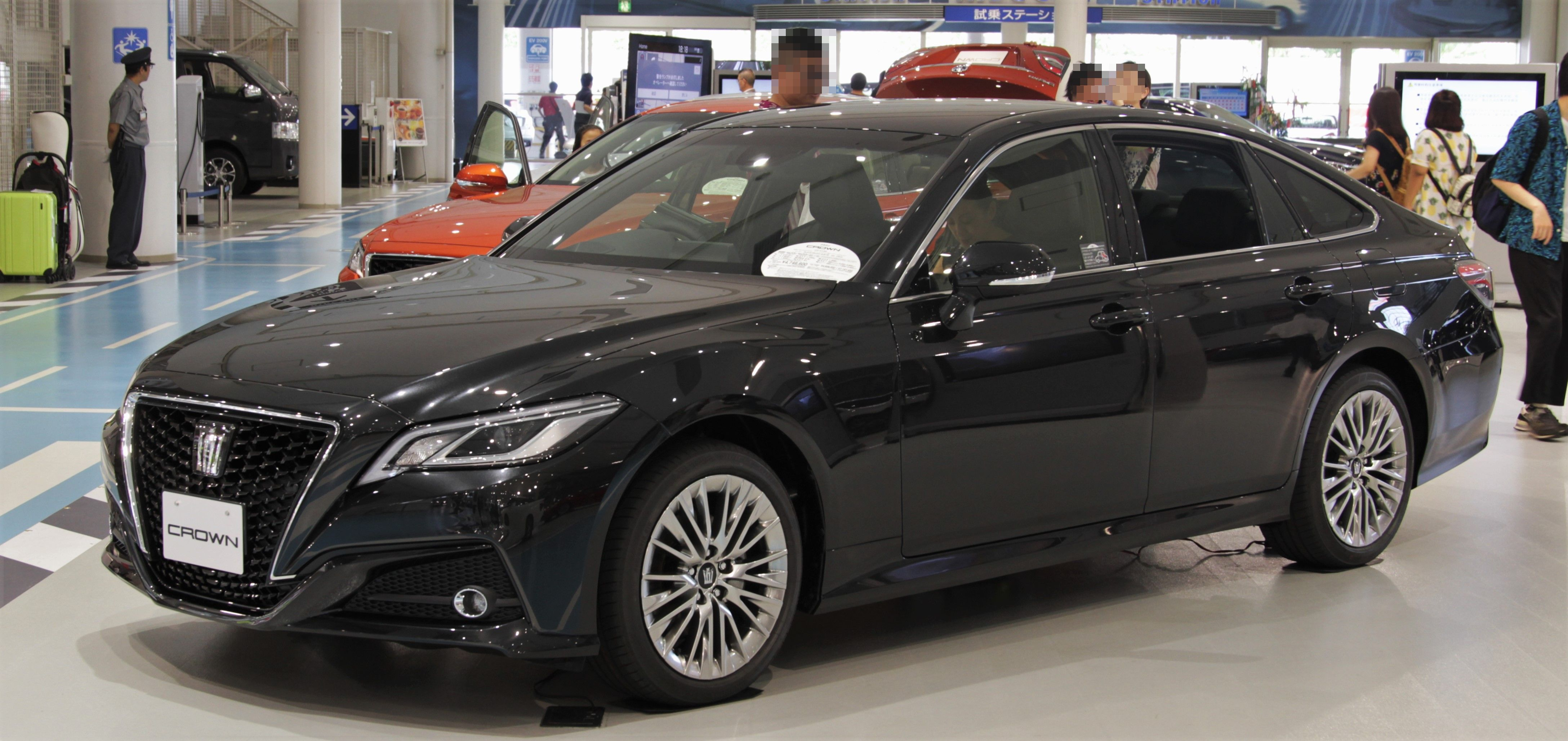
Toyota Crown Sedan (S220)

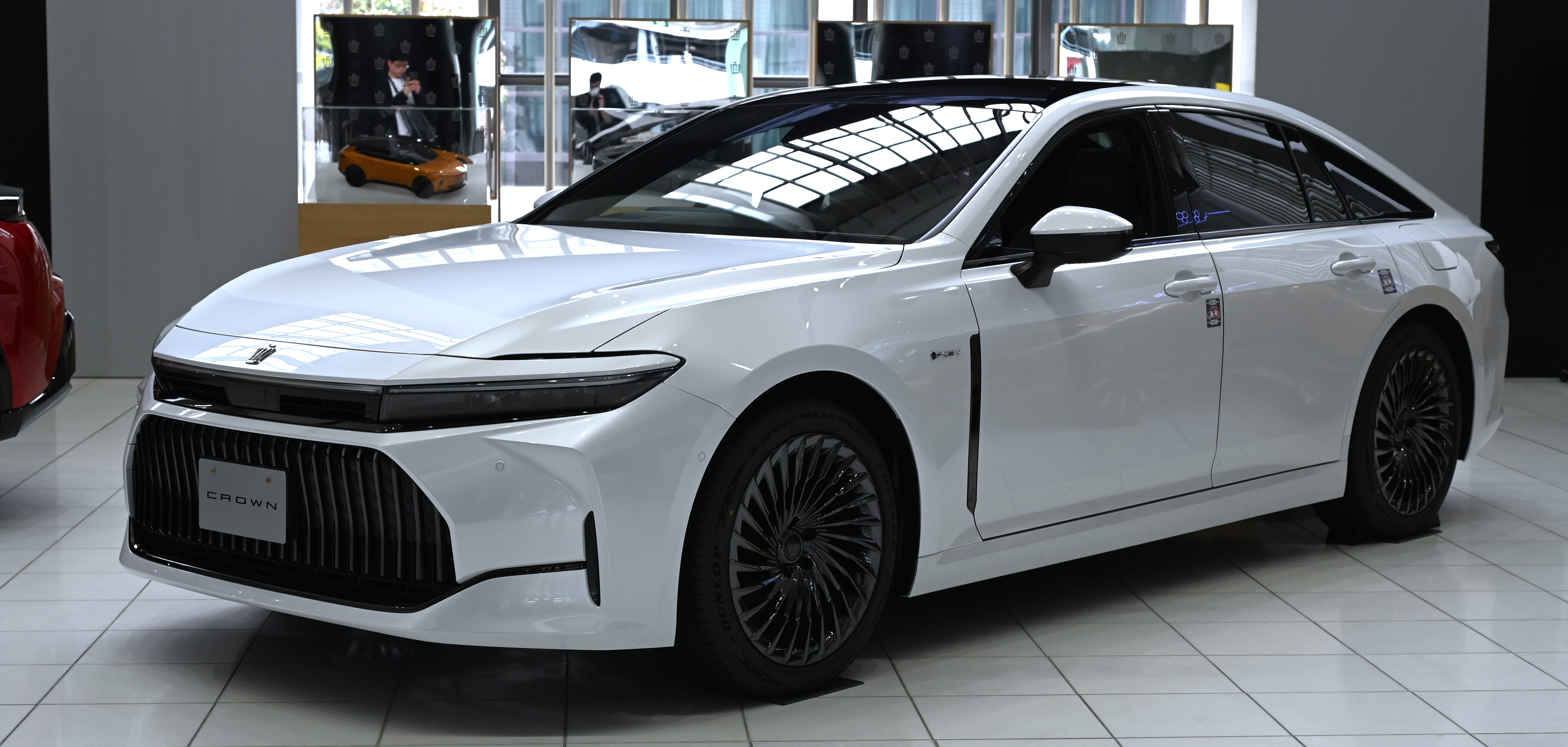
Toyota Crown Sedan (S230)

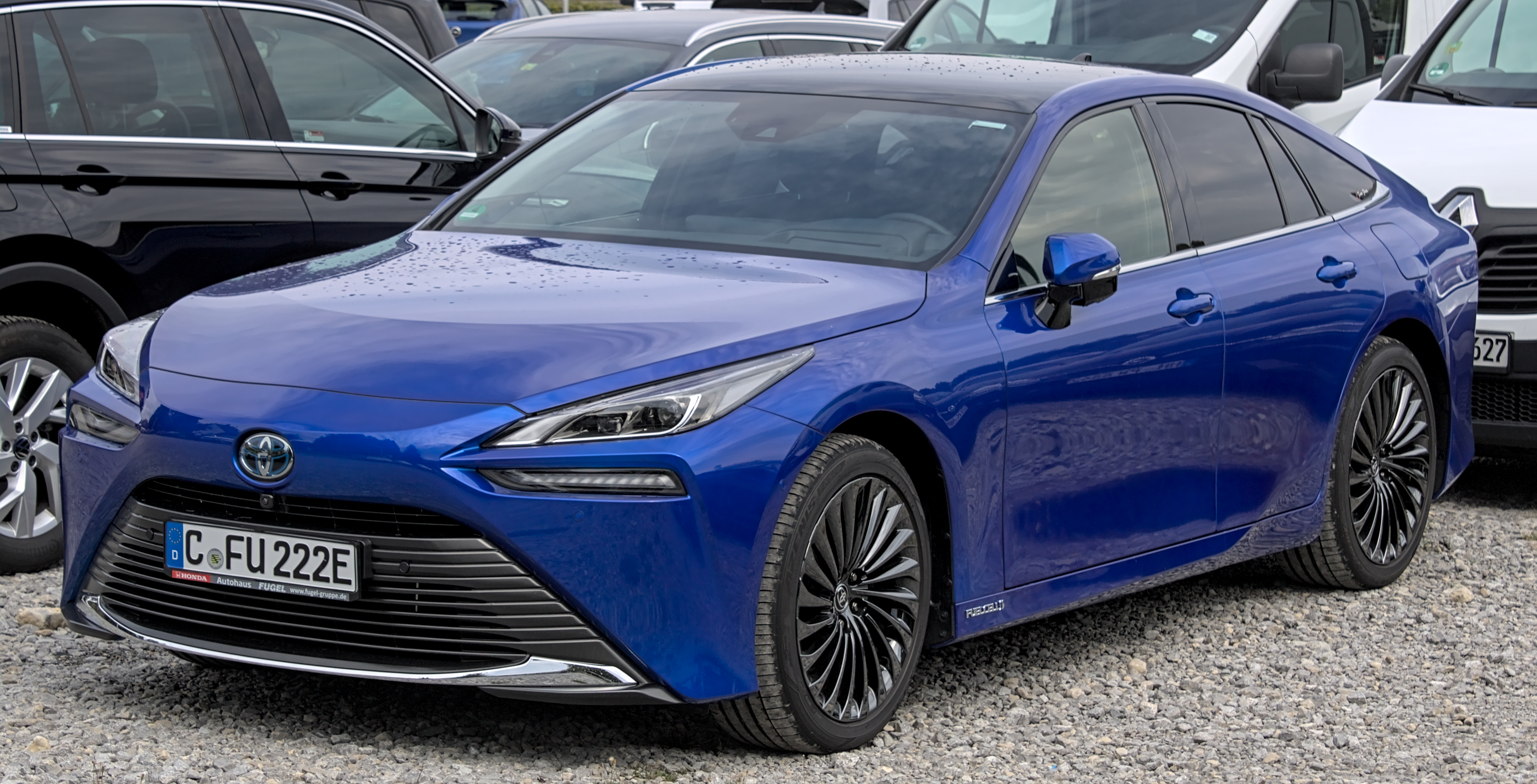
Toyota Mirai

== e-TNGA ==
e-TNGA is a modular platform dedicated to battery electric vehicles, which was announced in October 2019. Internally known as the 40PL platform, the platform will enable offering various type and size of vehicles, different battery capacity and with front-wheel drive, rear-wheel drive or dual motor all-wheel drive. This vehicle architecture is partitioned into five modules. These are the front module, center module, rear module, battery and motor. Up to three versions of each module are in development, including three capacities for the lithium-ion battery. The first e-TNGA-based model is the bZ4X crossover, which was presented for the first time in April 2021. Other vehicles planned by 2025 include a medium SUV, a medium minivan, a medium sedan, and a large SUV. For Subaru-badged models, the platform is also known as the e-Subaru Global Platform (e-SGP).

Vehicles using platform (calendar years):

- Toyota bZ4X/bZ — EA10 (2022–present)
  - Subaru Solterra (2022–present)
- Toyota bZ4X Touring/bZ Woodland — EA10 (2026–present)
  - Subaru Trailseeker/E-Outback (2026–present)
- Lexus RZ — EB10 (2022–present)
- Toyota bZ3 — EA10 (2023–present)
- Toyota C-HR+/C-HR — (2025–present)
  - Subaru Uncharted (2025–present)
- Toyota bZ5 — EA11 (2025–present)
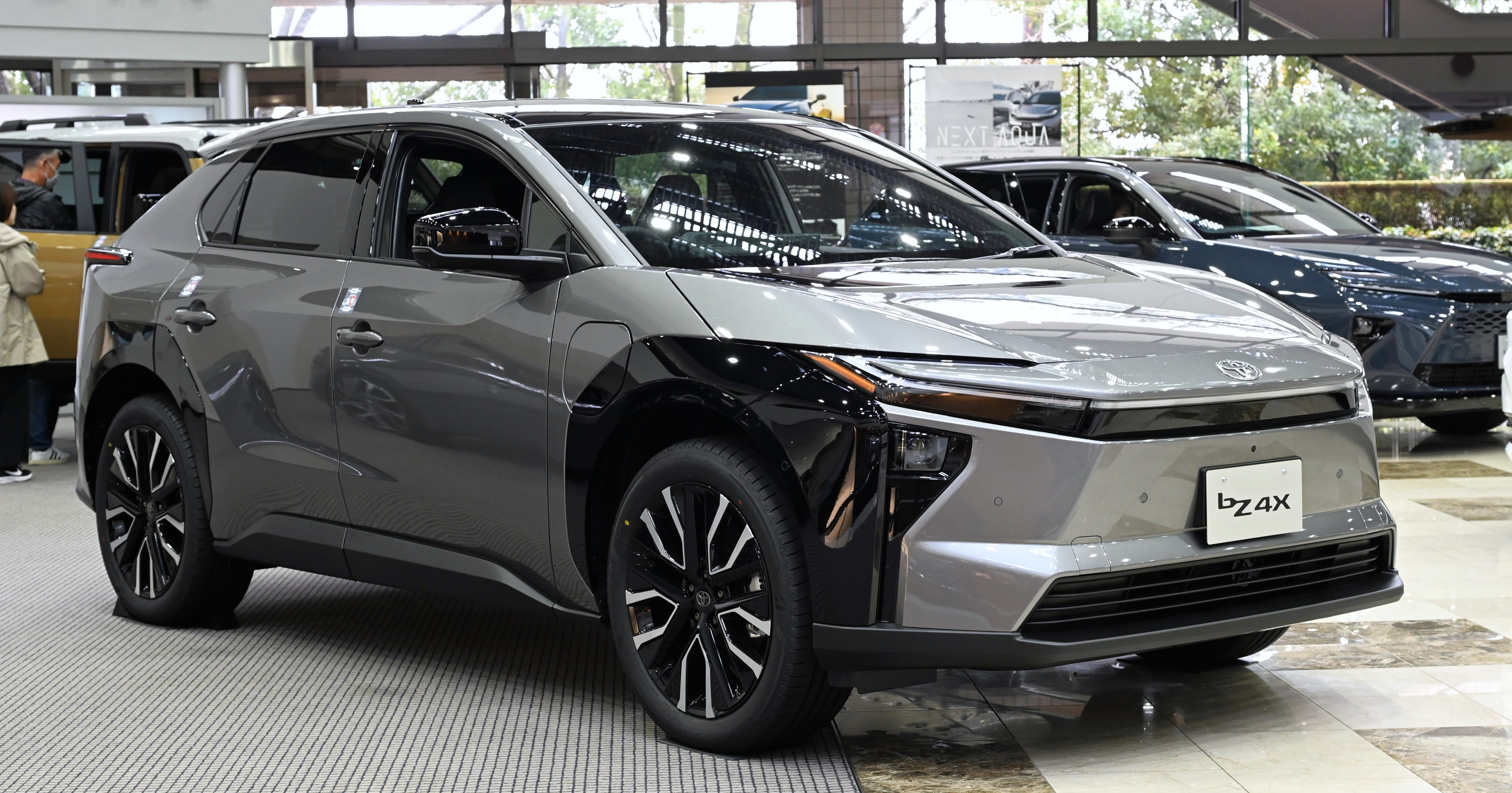
Toyota bZ4X

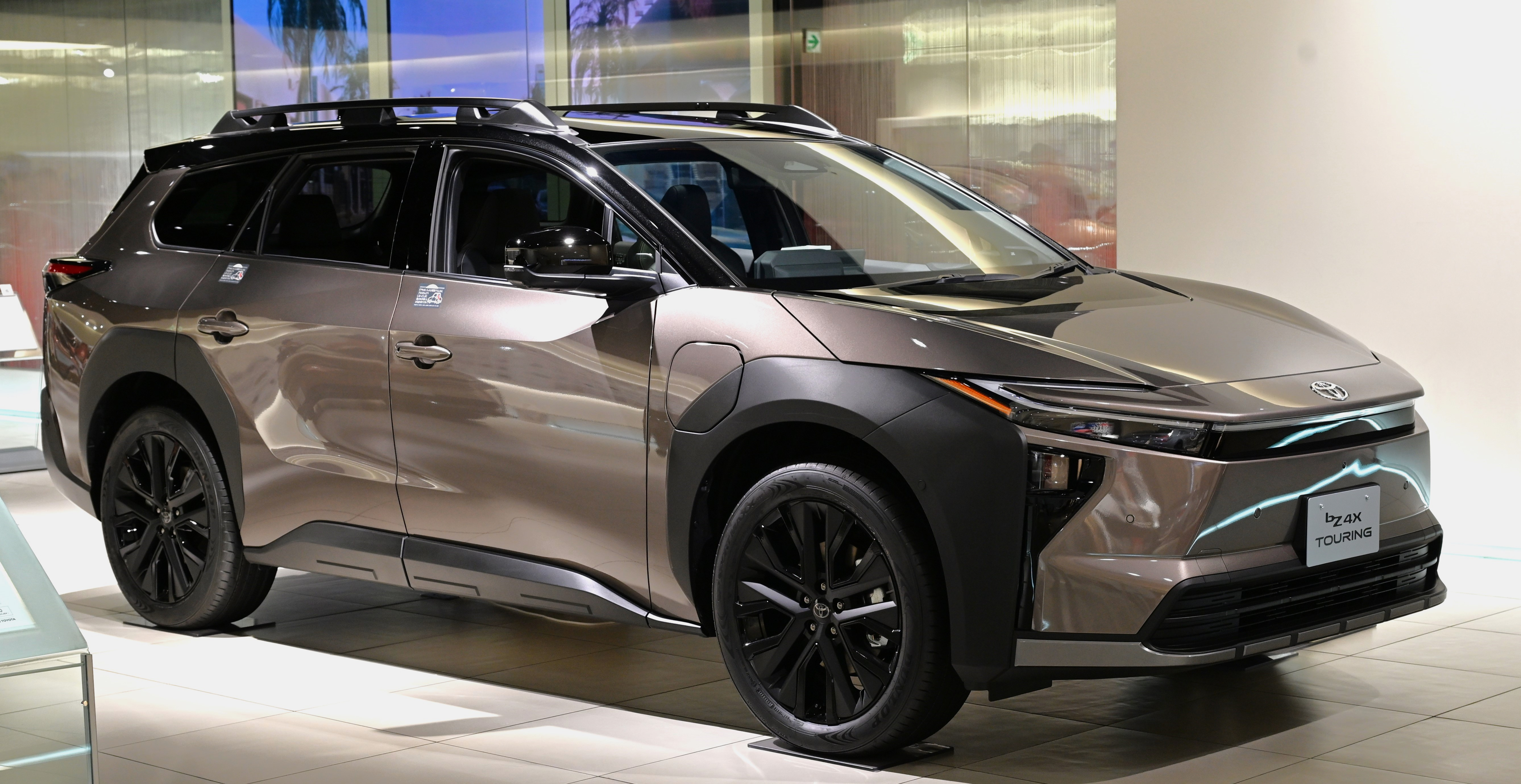
Toyota bZ4X Touring

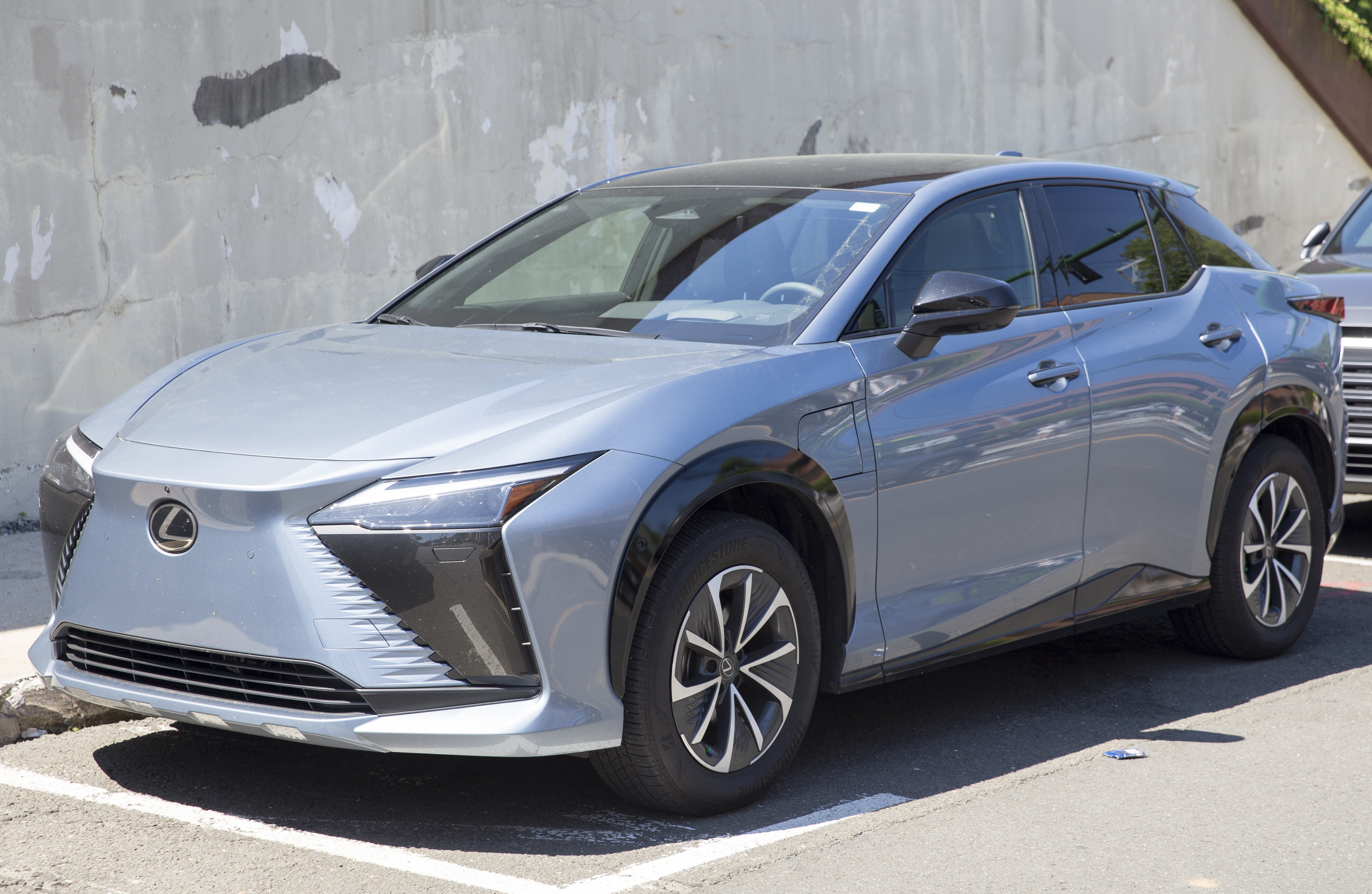
Lexus RZ

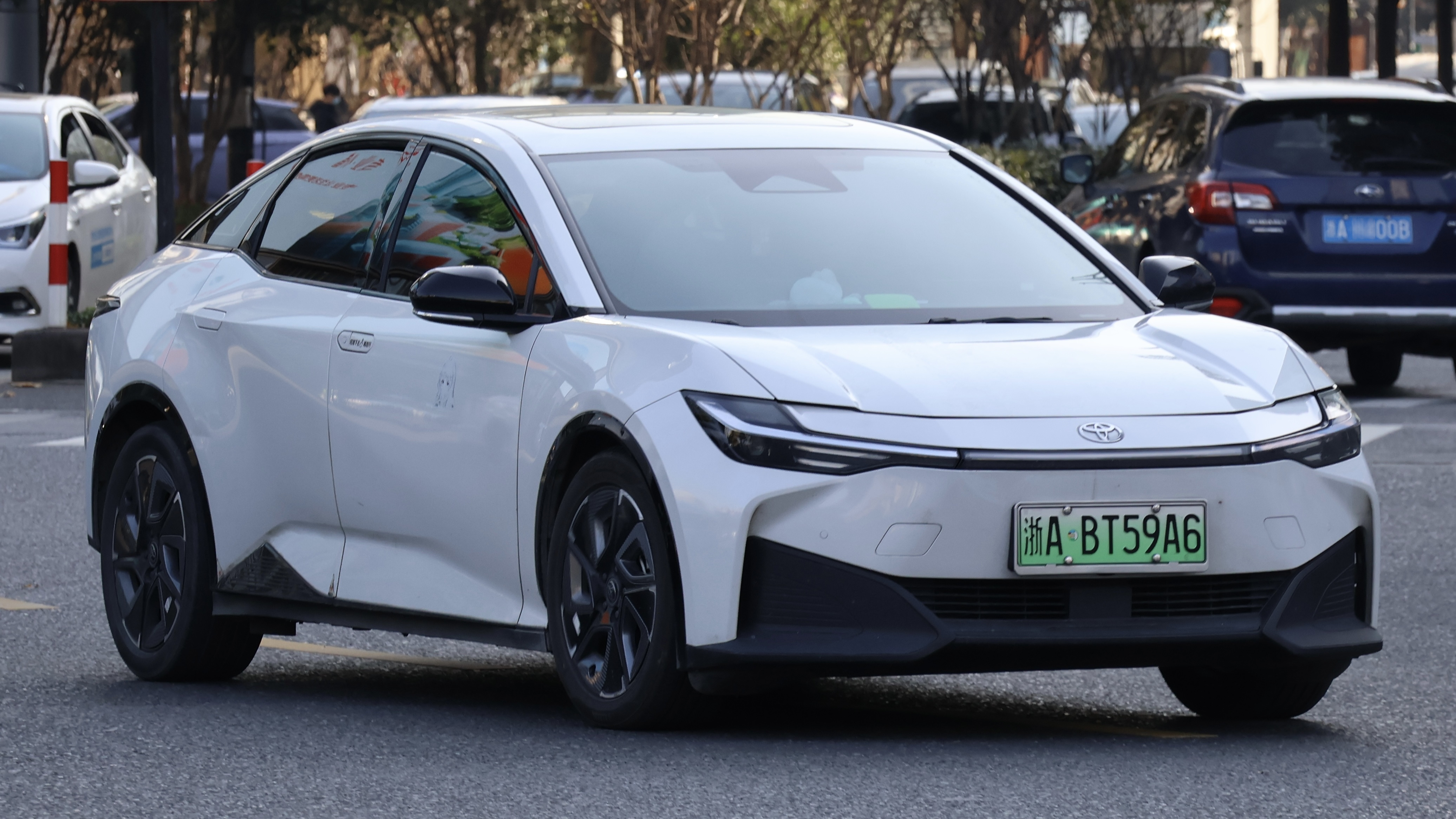
Toyota bZ3

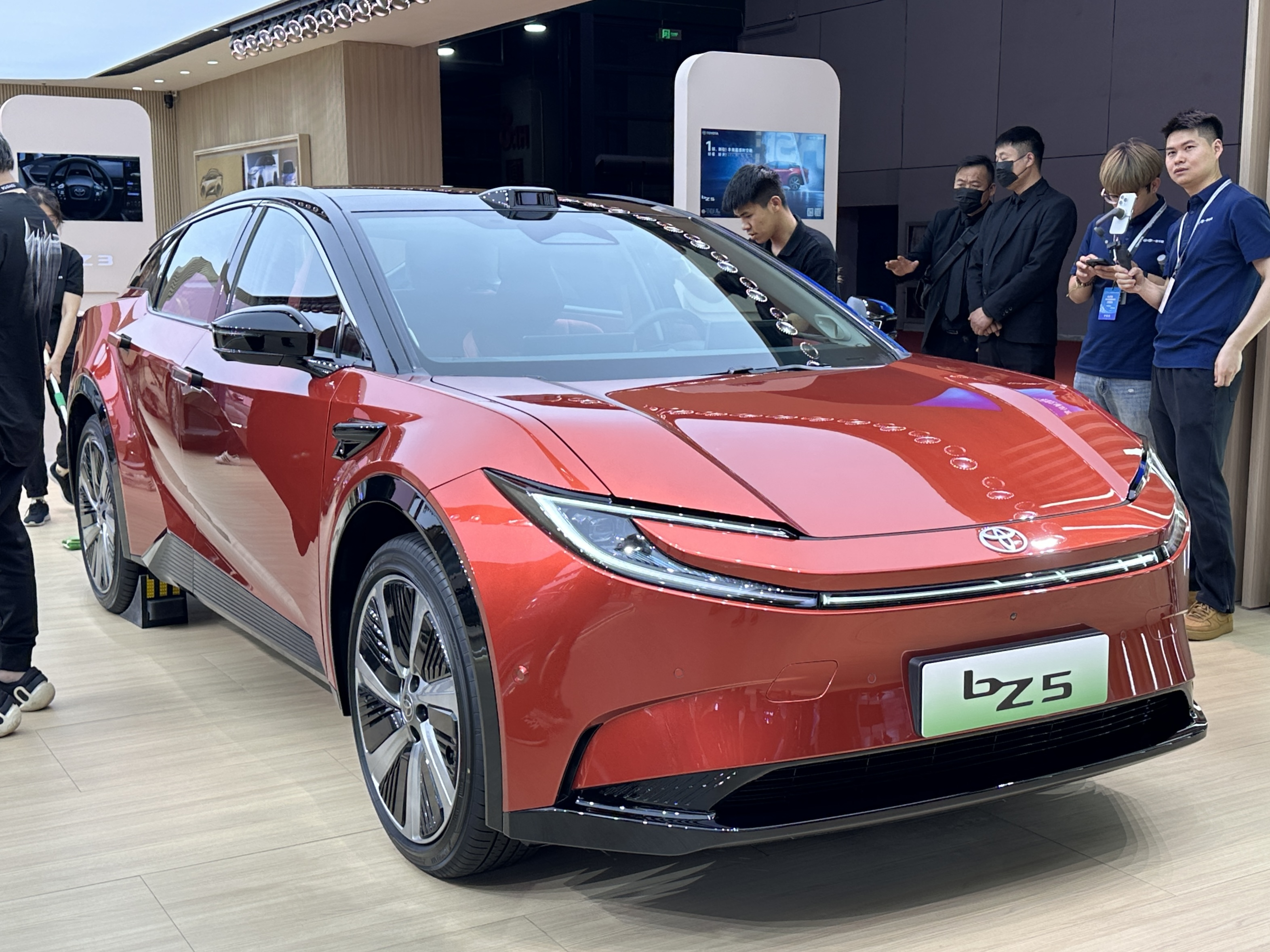
Toyota bZ5

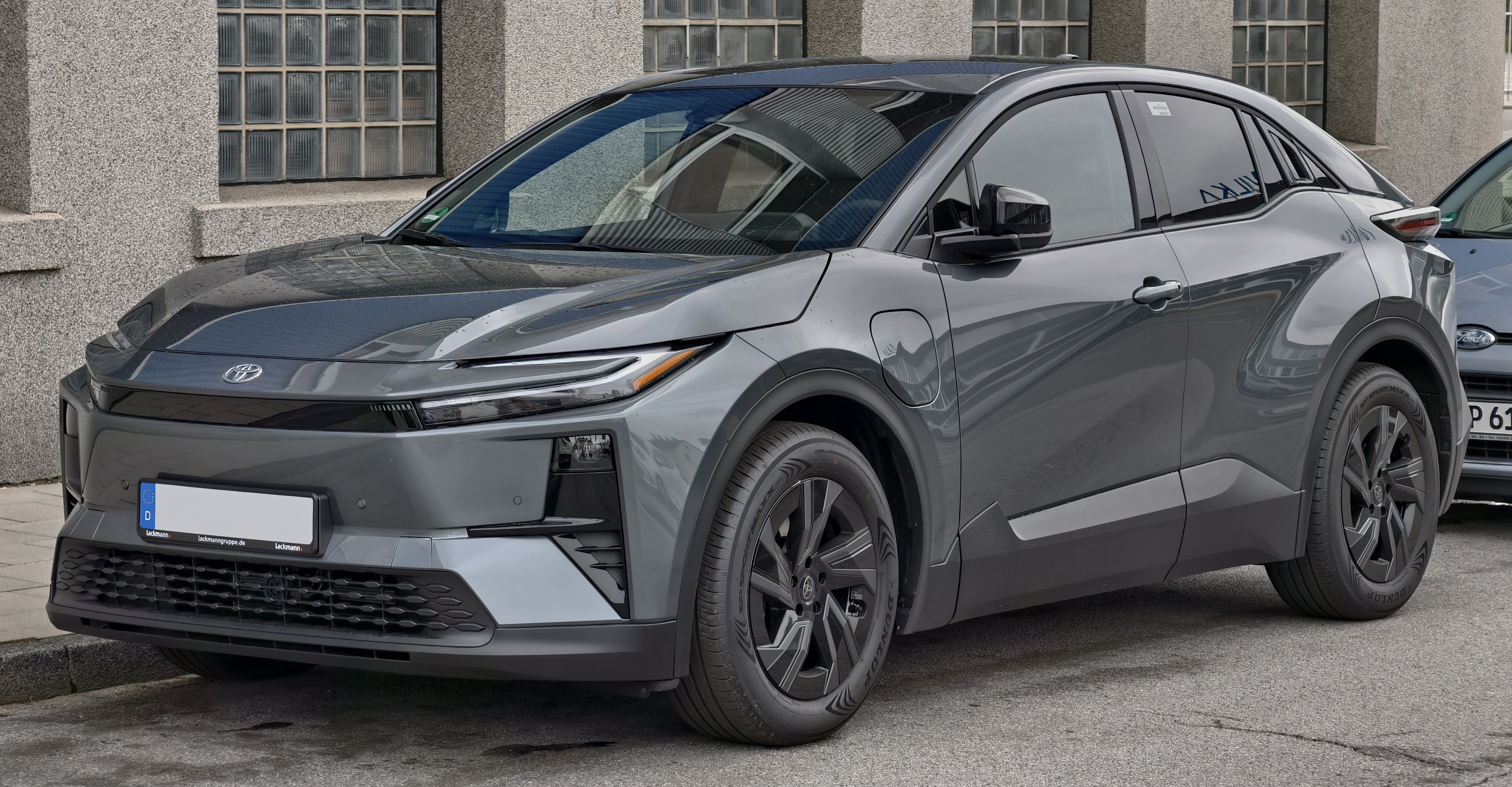
Toyota C-HR+

== See also ==
- Toyota Dynamic Force engine
- Daihatsu New Global Architecture
