= Lexus TX =

Full-size luxury crossover SUV

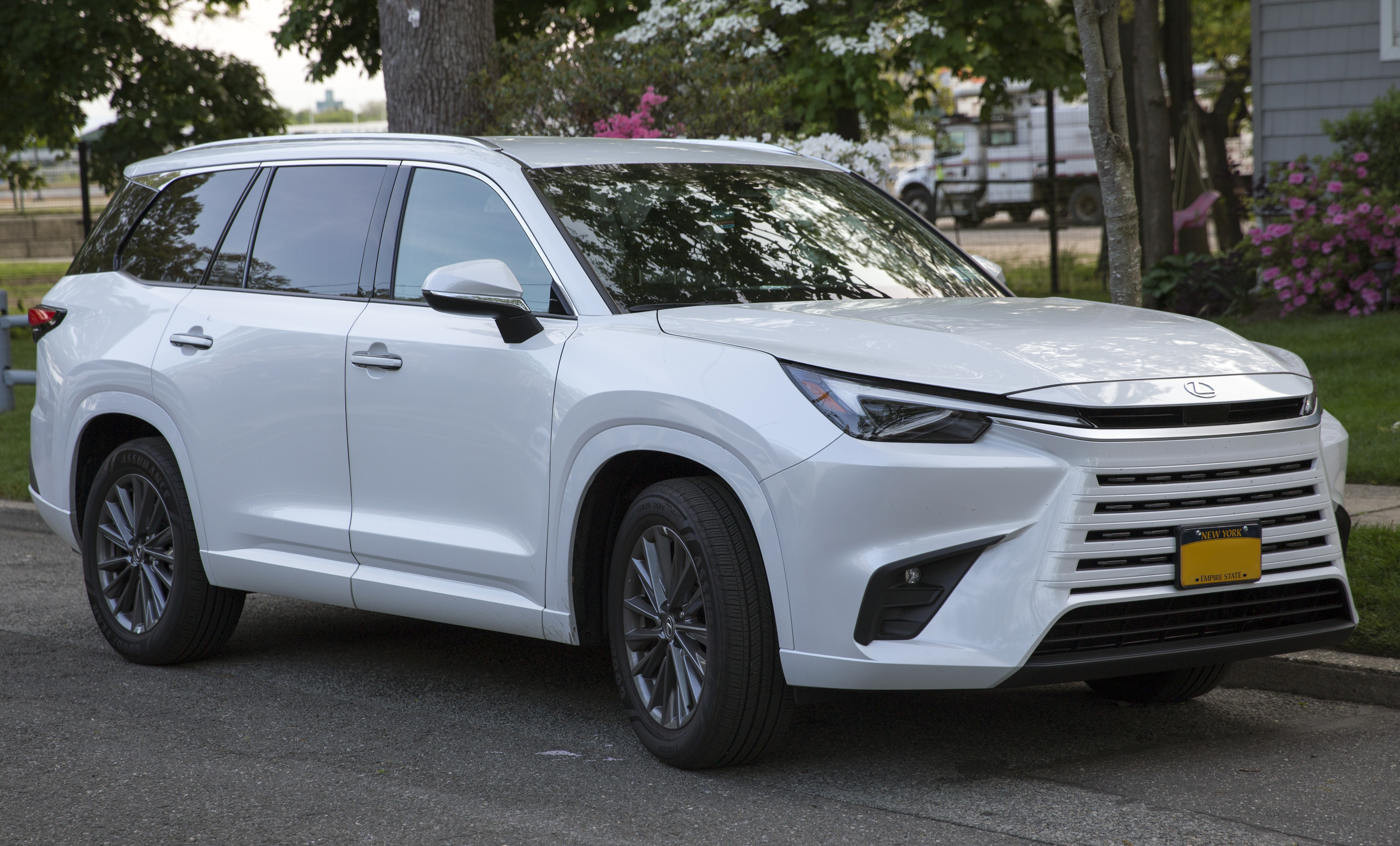
- 2024 Lexus TX 350

Overview
- Manufacturer: Toyota
- Model code: AU10
- Production: September 2023 – present
- Model years: 2024–present
- Assembly: United States: Princeton, Indiana (TMMI)

Body and chassis
- Class: Full-size luxury crossover SUV
- Body style: 5-door SUV
- Layout: Front-engine, front-wheel-drive (TX 350); Front-engine, four-wheel-drive (TX 350, 500h, 550h; Direct4)
- Platform: TNGA: GA-K
- Related: Toyota Grand Highlander; Toyota Century (G70); Toyota Highlander (XU70); Lexus RX (ALA10/ALH10); Toyota Crown (S235)

Powertrain
- Engine: Gasoline: 2.4 L T24A-FTS turbo I4 (TX 350, TAUA10/15); Gasoline hybrid: 2.4 L T24A-FTS turbo I4 (TX 500h, TAUH15); Gasoline plug-in hybrid: 3.5 L 2GR-FXS V6 (TX 550h+, GYU15)
- Power output: 275 hp (205 kW; 279 PS) (TX 350); 366 hp (273 kW; 371 PS) (TX 500h, combined); 404 hp (301 kW; 410 PS) (TX 550h+, combined)
- Transmission: 8-speed automatic (TX 350); 6-speed automatic (TX 500h); eCVT (TX 550h+)
- Hybrid drivetrain: Parallel (TX 500h); Plug-in (TX 550h+)
- Electric range: 33 mi (53 km) (TX 550h+)

Dimensions
- Wheelbase: 2,950 mm (116.1 in)
- Length: 5,159 mm (203.1 in)
- Width: 1,990 mm (78.3 in)
- Height: 1,781 mm (70.1 in)

Chronology
- Predecessor: Lexus RX L

The Lexus TX is a mid-size luxury crossover SUV with three-row seating produced by Japanese brand Lexus, a luxury division of Toyota. Produced since September 2023, it is exclusively marketed in North America, with no plans for export to Europe, Asia or other world markets. The TX is constructed upon the front- and all-wheel drive TNGA-K platform, shared with its Toyota Grand Highlander sibling and the mid-size XU70 Highlander/Kluger. The TX was revealed simultaneously with the J250 GX on June 8, 2023. Replacing the RX L, it takes the position of being the brand's only three-row crossover SUV.

== Overview ==
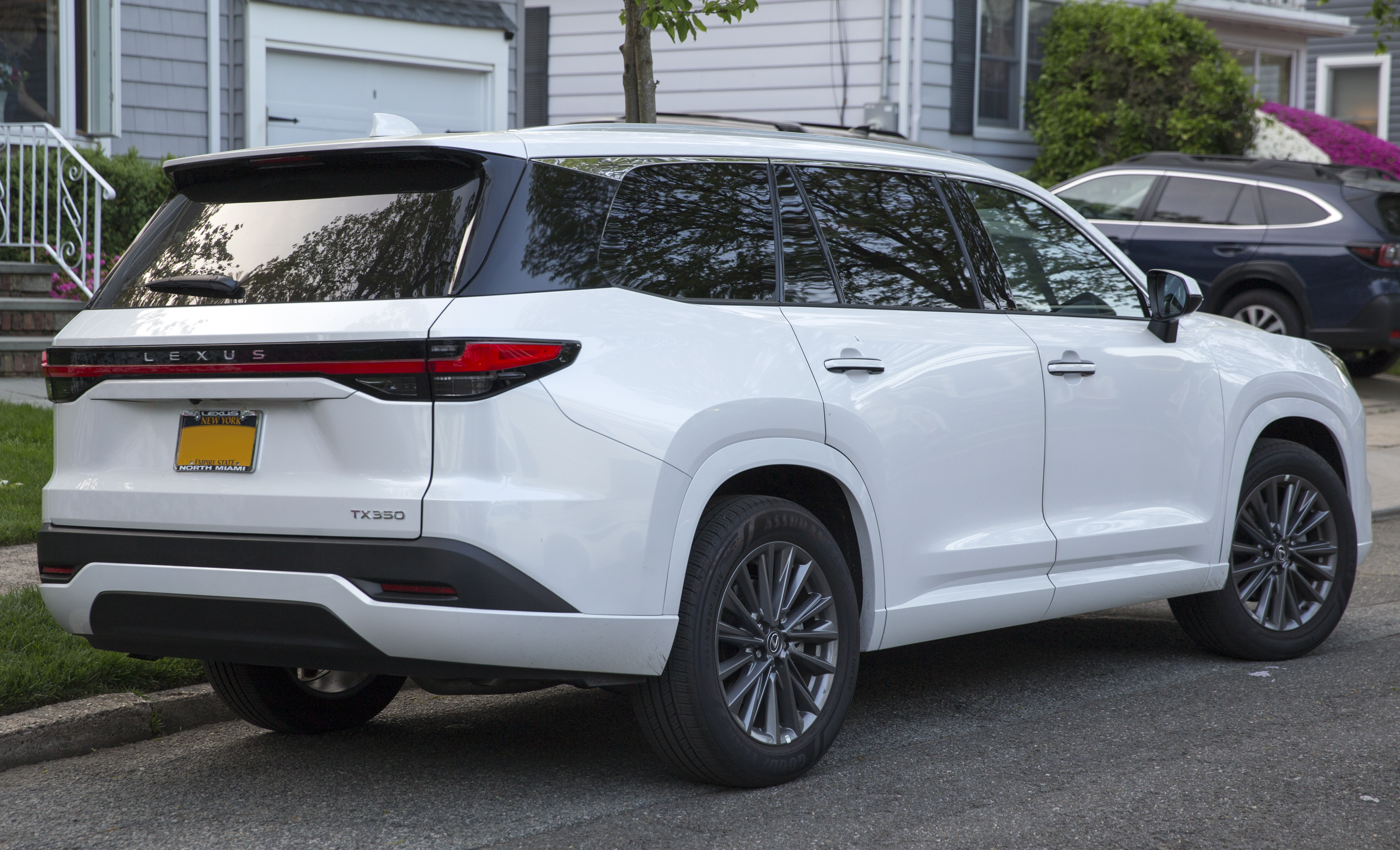
2024 TX 350 (rear view)

The TX was revealed on June 8, 2023, as part of Toyota's GA-K platform dedicated to mid-size and full-size vehicles with either a front- or all-wheel drive layout configuration. The new platform offers a low center of gravity and optimal weight distribution. To improve performance, enhancements were made to strengthen the TX's body rigidity and minimize noise, vibration, and harshness (NVH). Welds and adhesives are featured to increase the vehicle’s joint strength and rigidity through the main framework components of the chassis. The TX introduces a front MacPherson strut suspension and a rear multi-link suspension, as well as widened front and rear tracks.

The TX is available in six- and seven-seat configurations. The second row has either a 60:40 split-folding bench or captain's chairs, while the third row has a 50:50 split bench. Depending on the trim level and powertrain choice, the outboard second row seats can include heating and ventilation.

Four trim levels are available: Base, Premium, Luxury, and F Sport Handling. The TX 350 is available in all four trim levels. The TX 500h is available in the Premium and Luxury trims, and the TX 550h+ is exclusively available in the Luxury trim.

== Equipment ==
A 14.0-inch multimedia infotainment display is standard on base models, which runs Lexus' newest infotainment interface. Wireless Apple CarPlay and Android Auto are standard, as well as a navigation system integrated into the dashboard and a wireless smartphone charging system. A 12.3-inch digital gauge display can be reconfigured to show information to the driver, as well as an optional head-up display. A 21-speaker Mark Levinson premium stereo is optional. 20-inch wheels are standard on Premium and Luxury grades, while 22-inch wheels are available for the TX 350 Luxury grade and standard on the TX 550h+. The TX 350 F Sport Handling and TX 500h F Sport Performance feature exclusive 22-inch wheels.

The TX has a rear cargo space of 20.2 cubic feet (570 L) with all seats up. With the third row seats down, space increases to 57.4 cubic feet (1,630 L). With both the second and third row seats down, space increases to 97 cubic feet (2,700 L). Three interior color options are offered depending on grade: Peppercorn, Birch, and Black.

The TX features the brand's most technologically advanced safety system. System include Pre-Collision System with Pedestrian Detection, Dynamic Radar Cruise Control, Lane Tracing Assist, Lane Departure Alert with Steering Assist, Road Sign Assist and Proactive Driving Assist. The Advanced Park package allows for uncomplicated perpendicular and parallel parking/exiting. Additionally, a Traffic Jam Assist is available via a subscription and is designed to monitor surrounding traffic in low-speed driving situations on limited access roads, and will allow the vehicle to autonomously move forward and brake to keep safe distance between the TX and the preceding car.

== Powertrain ==
Three powertrains are offered: the TX 350, the TX 500h hybrid, and the TX 550h+ plug-in hybrid. The TX 350 is powered by the 2.4-liter T24A-FTS turbocharged inline-four engine rated at up to 275 hp (279 PS; 205 kW). The TX 500h F Sport Performance has a combined system output of 366 hp (371 PS; 273 kW) and features the T24A-FTS paired with a 1.4 kWh, 288-volt NiMH battery pack and two electric motors each producing 75 kW; 102 PS (101 hp) and 63 kW; 86 PS (85 hp). The TX 550h+ is rated at a combined 404 hp (410 PS; 301 kW) and features a naturally aspirated 3.5-liter 2GR-FXS V6 paired with an 18.1 kWh, 355.2-volt lithium-ion battery pack and two electric motors each producing 75 kW; 102 PS (101 hp) and 133 kW; 181 PS (179 hp), with all-electric range rated at 33 mi (53 km).

Type	Model	Engine code	Displ.	Power	Torque	Combined system output	Battery	Model codes	Trans.	Layout	Model years
Gasoline	TX 350	T24A-FTS	2,393 cc (2.4 L) turbocharged I4	205 kW; 279 PS (275 hp) @ 6,000 rpm	430 N⋅m (43.8 kg⋅m; 317 lb⋅ft) @ 1,700-3,000 rpm	-	-	TAUA10 TAUA15	8-speed automatic	FWD AWD	2024–present
Hybrid	TX 500h	T24A-FTS	2,393 cc (2.4 L) turbocharged I4	Engine: 202 kW; 275 PS (271 hp) @ 6,000 rpm ETM: 63 kW (85 hp) RM: 75 kW (101 hp)	Engine: 460 N⋅m (46.9 kg⋅m; 339 lb⋅ft) @ 2,000-3,600 rpm ETM: 292 N⋅m (29.8 kg⋅m; 215 lb⋅ft) RM: 168 N⋅m (17.1 kg⋅m; 124 lb⋅ft)	273 kW; 371 PS (366 hp) / 550 N⋅m (56.1 kg⋅m; 406 lb⋅ft)	1.8 kWh, 288V NiMH	TAUH15	6-speed automatic	AWD (DIRECT4)	2024–present
Plug-in hybrid	TX 550h+	2GR-FXS	3,456 cc (3.5 L) V6	Engine: 193 kW; 263 PS (259 hp) @ 6,000 rpm TM: 133 kW; 181 PS (179 hp) RM: 75 kW; 102 PS (101 hp)	Engine: 335 N⋅m (34.2 kg⋅m; 247 lb⋅ft) @ 4,600 rpm TM: 292 N⋅m (29.8 kg⋅m; 215 lb⋅ft) RM: 168 N⋅m (17.1 kg⋅m; 124 lb⋅ft)	301 kW; 410 PS (404 hp)	18.1 kWh, 355.2V lithium-ion	GYU15	eCVT	AWD (DIRECT4)	2024–2026

== Model year changes ==
In 2024, for the 2025 model year, a new F Sport Handling trim was added to the TX 350. Standard features for this trim include the same front fascia as the TX 500h F Sport Performance, exclusive 22-inch wheels, all-wheel drive, Adaptive Variable Suspension, aluminum pedals and scuff plates, and F Sport interior styling.

The plug-in hybrid TX 550h+ was discontinued at the end of the 2026 model year, citing low sales (only 2 percent of total TX sales).

== Sales ==
Calendar year	US (hybrid; plug-in hybrid)
2024	28,640 (4,812; 502)
2025	57,346 (10,740; 953)
