= Lexus LM =

Luxury minivan

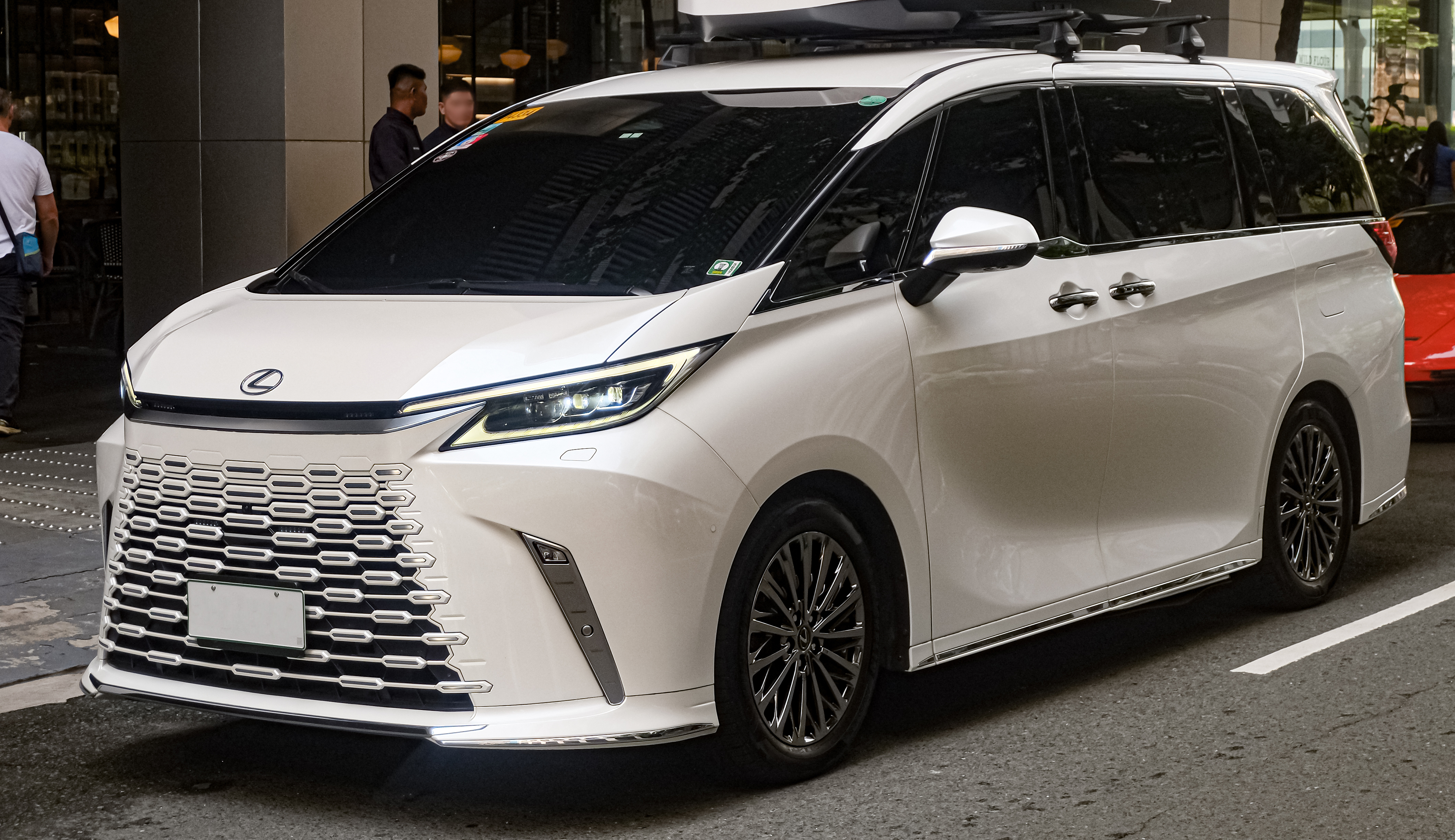
- 2023 Lexus LM 350h (AAWH10)

Overview
- Manufacturer: Toyota
- Production: 2020–present

Body and chassis
- Class: Luxury minivan
- Body style: 5-door minivan
- Layout: Front-engine, front-wheel-drive; Front-engine, four-wheel-drive
- Related: Toyota Alphard

The Lexus LM is a luxury MPV produced and manufactured by Japanese brand Lexus, a luxury division of Toyota. Introduced in 2019 as the first minivan from Lexus, two generations of the LM have been produced with varying degrees of relation with the Toyota Alphard/Vellfire. The first generation LM was available as a seven or four-seater with gasoline and hybrid engine options from 2020 to 2023. As of the second generation, the LM is exclusively a hybrid, and is available in four, six, and seven-seater configurations.

The LM designation stands for "Luxury Mover".

== First generation (AH30; 2020) ==
First generation
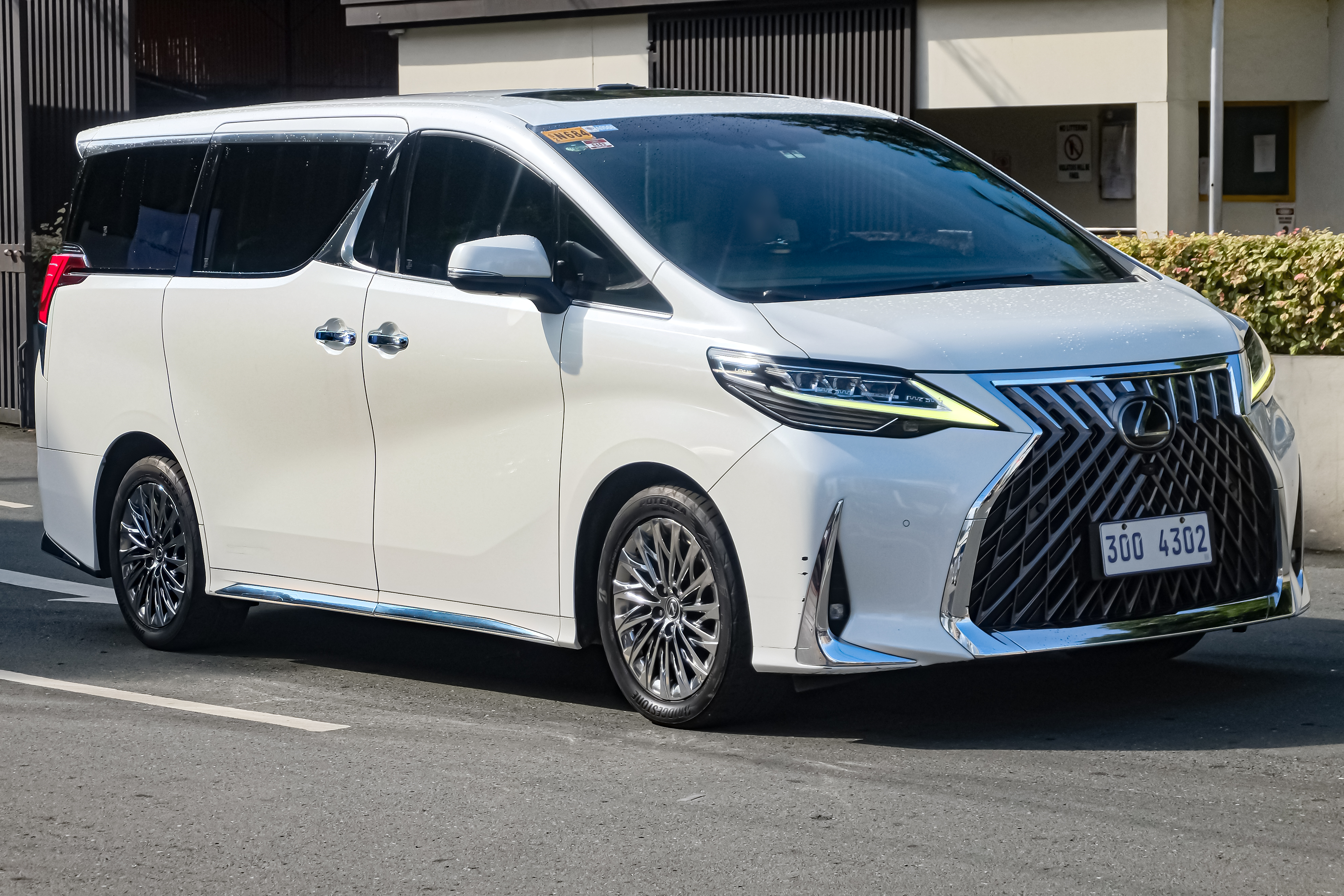
- LM 350 (Philippines)

Overview
- Model code: AH30
- Also called: Toyota Alphard (AH30); Toyota Vellfire / Crown Vellfire (AH30)
- Production: February 2020–2023
- Assembly: Japan: Inabe, Mie (Toyota Auto Body)

Body and chassis
- Platform: Toyota New MC platform

Powertrain
- Engine: Gasoline: 3.5 L 2GR-FE V6 (Hong Kong, LM 350); 3.5 L 2GR-FKS V6 (LM 350); Gasoline hybrid: 2.5 L 2AR-FXE I4 (LM 300h)
- Electric motor: 650 V permanent magnet synchronous motor: 105 kW (141 hp; 143 PS) 5NM + 50 kW (67 hp; 68 PS) 4NM (hybrid)
- Transmission: 6-speed ATF U660E automatic; 8-speed ATF UA80E automatic; e-CVT (hybrid)
- Hybrid drivetrain: Power-split
- Battery: 1.6 kWh nickel–metal hydride

Dimensions
- Wheelbase: 3,000 mm (118.1 in)
- Length: 5,040 mm (198.4 in)
- Width: 1,850 mm (72.8 in)
- Height: 1,945 mm (76.6 in) (Lexus LM)
- Curb weight: 2,180–2,220 kg (4,806–4,894 lb)

The first-generation LM was unveiled on 16 April 2019 at the 18th Shanghai International Automobile Industry Exhibition and first released on 20 February 2020 in China. Based on the third-generation Alphard, the LM is slightly longer than the Alphard it is based on, measuring in at 5,040 mm (198.4 in) long.

Compared to the third-generation Alphard, the LM features newer and stronger structural components, along with additional soundproofing elements such as dual-pane windows. There were two seating configurations available, a 7-seater configuration that is based on the Alphard Executive Lounge variant, and a 4-seater configuration named the "Emperor Suite", based on the Alphard Royal Lounge variant. The LM features a new suspension setup featuring Swing Valve technology.

The first-generation LM was available in China, Taiwan, Hong Kong, and Southeast Asian markets such as Indonesia, Thailand, the Philippines, Malaysia, and Vietnam. Despite being built in Japan, the first-generation LM was not available there.

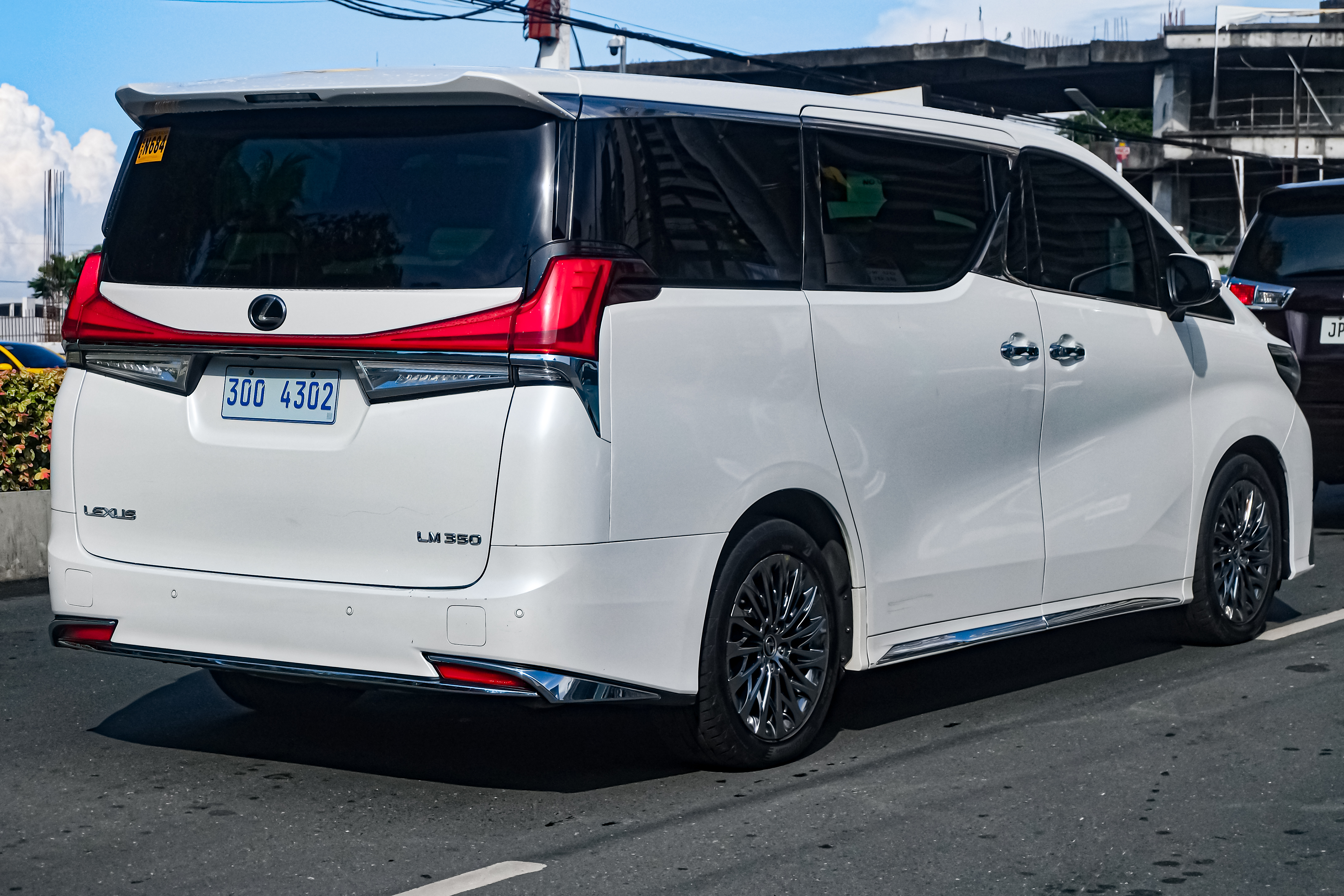
Lexus LM 350 rear

=== Powertrain ===
Two engine options are available, a 2.5-liter 2AR-FXE hybrid four-cylinder in the LM 300h, and the 3.5-liter 2GR-FKS V6 in the LM 350 (2GR-FE for the Hong Kong market).

Type	Engine code	Displacement	Power	Torque	Combined system output	Electric motor	Battery	Transmission	Model code	Layout	Cal. years
Gasoline	2GR-FKS	3,456 cc (3.5 L) V6	221 kW (296 hp; 300 PS) @ 6,600 rpm	361 N⋅m (36.8 kg⋅m; 266 lb⋅ft) @ 4,700 rpm	-	-	-	8-speed automatic	GGH31 (LM 350)	FWD	2020–2023
Gasoline	2GR-FE	3,456 cc (3.5 L) V6	200 kW (268 hp; 272 PS) @ 6,200 rpm	340 N⋅m (34.7 kg⋅m; 251 lb⋅ft) @ 4,700 rpm	-	-	-	6-speed automatic	GGH31 (LM 350, Hong Kong)	FWD	2020–2023
Gasoline hybrid	2AR-FXE	2,494 cc (2.5 L) I4	Engine: 150 kW (201 hp; 204 PS) @ 5,700 rpm Front motor: 105 kW (141 hp; 143 PS) Rear motor: 50 kW (67 hp; 68 PS)	Engine: 206 N⋅m (21.0 kg⋅m; 152 lb⋅ft) @ 4,400–4,800 rpm Front motor: 270 N⋅m (27.5 kg⋅m; 199 lb⋅ft) Rear motor: 139 N⋅m (14.2 kg⋅m; 103 lb⋅ft)	145 kW (194 hp; 197 PS)	5NM permanent magnet motor (front) 4NM permanent magnet motor (rear)	224.8 VNiMH	e-CVT	AYH36 (LM 300h)	AWD E-Four	2020–2023

== Second generation (AW10; 2023) ==
Second generation
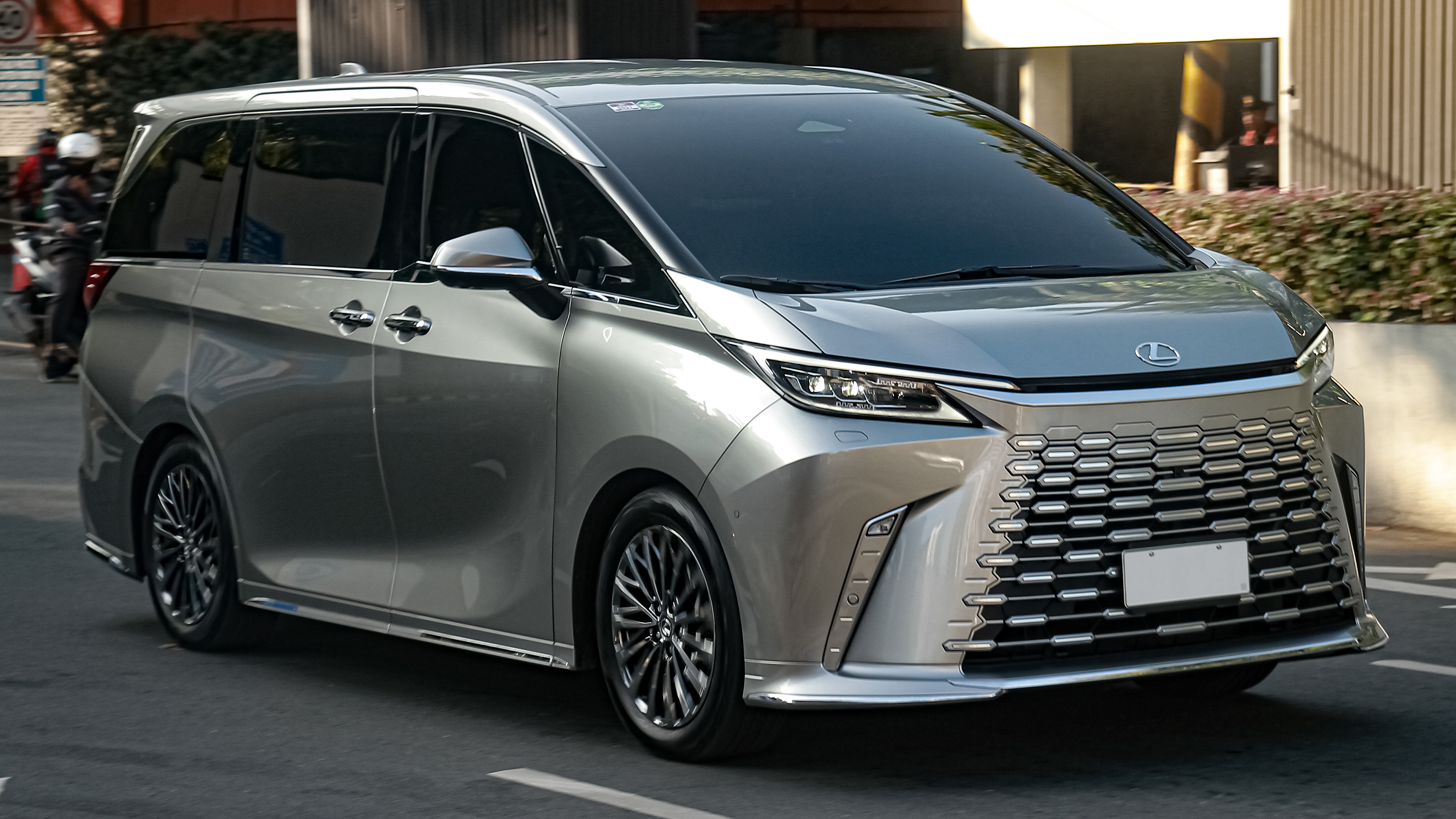
- LM 350h AWD (AAWH15, Philippines)

Overview
- Model code: AW10
- Production: April 2023–present
- Assembly: Japan: Inabe, Mie (Toyota Auto Body); Tahara, Aichi (Tahara plant)
- Designer: Takami Yokō

Body and chassis
- Platform: TNGA: GA-K
- Related: Toyota Alphard/Vellfire (AH40)

Powertrain
- Engine: Gasoline hybrid: 2.4 L T24A-FTS turbo I4 (LM 500h, TAWH15); 2.5 L A25A-FXS I4 (LM 350h, AAWH10)
- Transmission: 6-speed automatic; eCVT
- Hybrid drivetrain: Power-split (350h) parallel hybrid (500h)

Dimensions
- Wheelbase: 3,000 mm (118.1 in)
- Length: 5,125 mm (201.8 in)
- Width: 1,890 mm (74.4 in)
- Height: 1,955 mm (77.0 in)
- Curb weight: 2,360 kg (5,203 lb)

The second-generation LM debuted on 18 April 2023 at the Shanghai Auto Show. The model is further distanced from the Alphard/Vellfire with significantly different bodywork and a separate model code. Unlike the first-generation model, which was sold only in China, Taiwan and Southeast Asia, it was available in several countries, including in Europe, Australia, India, and Japan for the first time. Despite this, the LM is not available in North America.

The model is exclusively sold as a hybrid vehicle, abandoning the conventional gasoline model from the previous model, now having only a gasoline hybrid version.

The model features the latest iteration of the "spindle grille" that is hexagon-patterned, replacing the large spindle grille of the outgoing model, while the Lexus emblem moves from the grille to the hood. The A-pillars are blacked out to create a full floating roof effect.

A first for Lexus, the second-generation LM debuts "Rear Climate Concierge", which integrates controls of the air conditioning, sunshades, lighting, seat position, etc. The LM also features heated armrests and ottomans, another Lexus first, and is available with a 48-inch rear screen.

Two models are offered, 350h and 500h, with Lexus' Direct4 electric four-wheel drive system available. It will be available in three configurations: 4-seater, 6-seater, and 7-seater, as well as 4 exterior colors: Black, White, Beige, and Red.

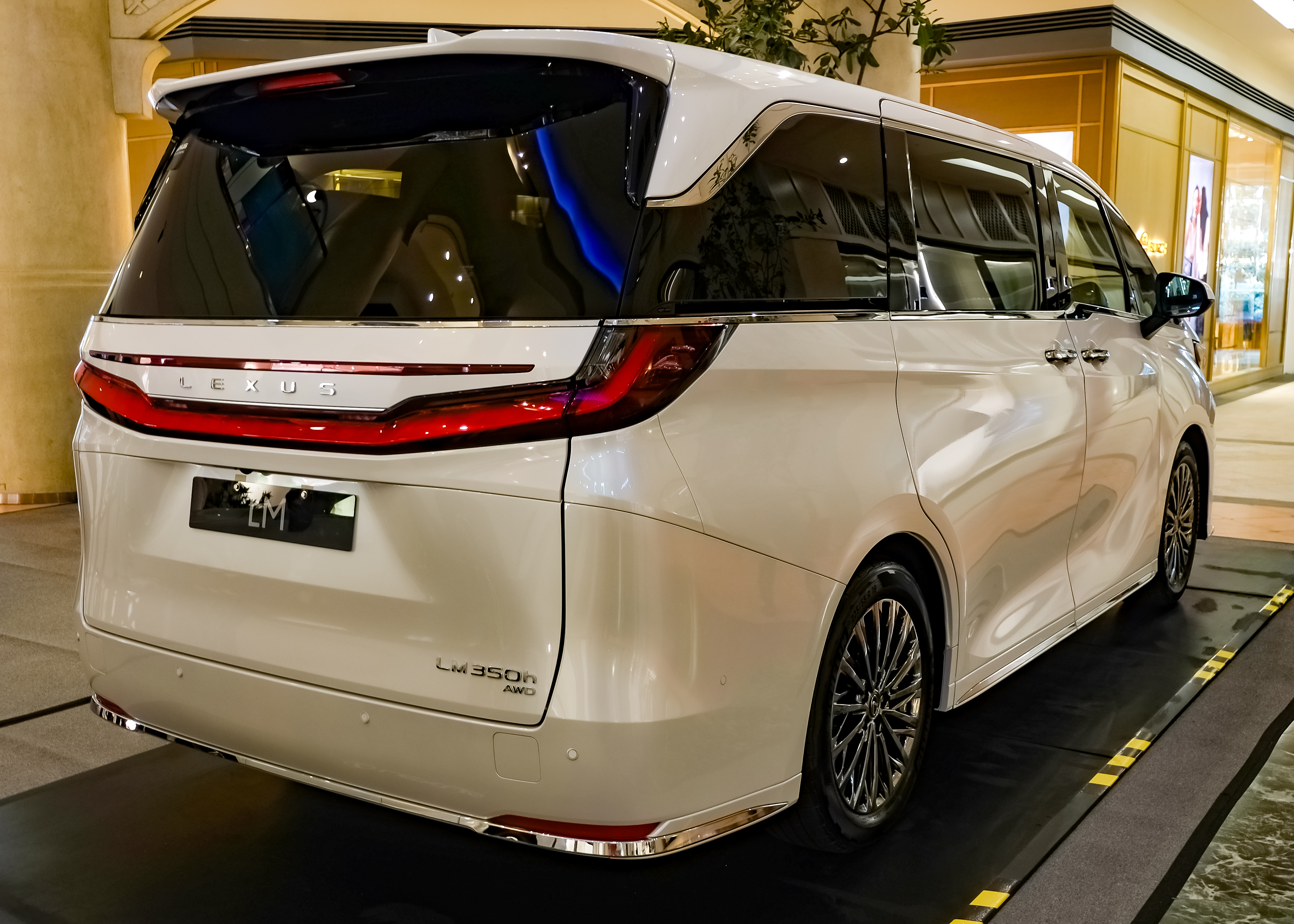
Rear view of 350h (AAWH15, Philippines)

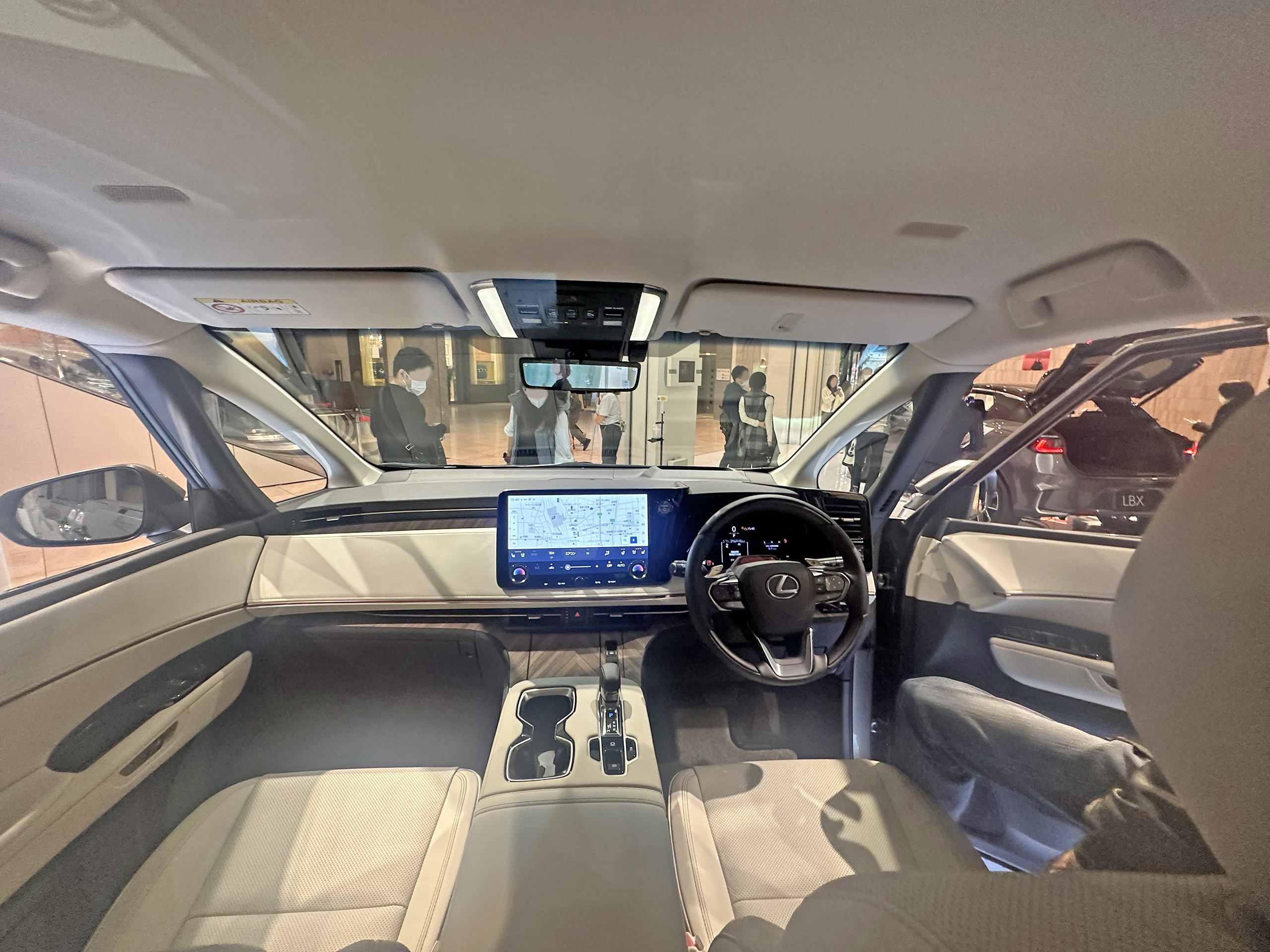
Interior

=== Markets ===
==== Japan ====
The LM went on sale in Japan on 19 October 2023. It is available as the 500h Executive grade only. The LM is available in 4 exterior colors (Sonic Quartz, Sonic Titanium, Graphite Black Glass Flakes, and Sonic Agate), and two interior colors (Solis White with Satin Copper trim, and Black with Satin Silver trim). Test drives for the LM are slated to be ready in January 2024. The 6-seater and 7-seater models will be available at a later date.

As is tradition for most Lexus and Toyota models available in Japan, the LM gains a styling kit from Toyota's Modellista division. It includes a front lip spoiler, a rear bumper spoiler, side skirts, a chrome garnish for the front and rear, and side garnishes for the front end forward the air intakes. 19-inch alloy wheels complete the exterior appearance, while a lacquered panel is fitted to the interior partition to complete the kit.

==== China ====
The LM 350h was launched in China in August 2023. in November 2023, The LM 500h 4-seater and 6-seater models will be launched at the 2023 Guangzhou Auto Show.

==== Europe ====
The LM was introduced in Spain in late May 2023. It is available in the UK from August 2023. It is offered as a LM350h FWD, LM 350h AWD & LM350h Takumi 7-seater.

==== Australia ====
The LM was launched in Australia in December 2023. In June 2023, the LM received regulatory approval for sale in Australia.

==== India ====
The LM was launched in India in August 2023, with bookings commencing on 24 August.

==== Philippines ====
The LM was launched in the Philippines on 10 October 2023. Two variants are available, the LM 350h 7 and 4-seater, both standard with all-wheel drive.

==== Thailand ====
The LM was launched in Thailand on 1 September 2023, marking first ASEAN debut. Four variants are available, the LM 350h 7 and 4-seater and LM500h 4-seater and 6-seater.

==== Indonesia ====
The LM was launched in Indonesia on 2 October 2023, during the Gaikindo Indonesia International Auto Show. Three variants are available, the LM 350h 7 and 4-seater and LM500h 4-seater.

==== Malaysia ====
The LM was launched in Malaysia on 27 May 2024. Two variants are available, the LM 350h 7-seater and LM500h 4-seater.

=== Powertrain ===
The second generation LM uses the same engine used on multiple vehicles based on the GA-K platform, such as the A25A-FXS and T24A-FTS engines. The LM 350h will have 184 kW (247 hp; 250 PS), whereas the LM 500h will have 273 kW (366 hp; 371 PS).

Type	Engine code	Displacement	Power	Torque	Combined system output	Electric motor	Battery	Transmission	Model code	Layout	Cal. years
Gasoline hybrid	A25A-FXS	2,487 cc (2.5 L) I4	Engine: 140 kW (188 hp; 190 PS) @ 6,000 rpm Front motor: 134 kW (180 hp; 182 PS)	Engine: 236 N⋅m (24.1 kg⋅m; 174 lb⋅ft) @ 4,300–4,500 rpm Front motor: 270 N⋅m (27.5 kg⋅m; 199 lb⋅ft)	184 kW (247 hp; 250 PS)	5NM AC synchronous (front)	5 Ah NiMH	e-CVT	AAWH10 (LM 350h)	FWD	
Gasoline hybrid	A25A-FXS	2,487 cc (2.5 L) I4	+ Rear motor: 40 kW (54 hp; 54 PS)	+ Rear motor: 121 N⋅m (12.3 kg⋅m; 89.2 lb⋅ft)	184 kW (247 hp; 250 PS)	+ 4NM AC synchronous (rear)	5 Ah NiMH	e-CVT	AAWH15 (LM 350h)	AWD E-Four	2023–present
Gasoline hybrid	T24A-FTS	2,393 cc (2.4 L) I4 turbocharged	Engine: 202 kW (271 hp; 275 PS) @ 6,000 rpm Front motor: 64 kW (86 hp; 87 PS) Rear motor: 75.9 kW (102 hp; 103 PS)	Engine: 460 N⋅m (46.9 kg⋅m; 339 lb⋅ft) @ 2,000–3,000 rpm Front motor: 292 N⋅m (29.8 kg⋅m; 215 lb⋅ft) Rear motor: 169 N⋅m (17.2 kg⋅m; 125 lb⋅ft)	273 kW (366 hp; 371 PS)	1ZM AC synchronous (front) 1YM AC synchronous (rear)		6-speed Automatic	TAWH15 (LM 500h)	Direct4	2023–present

== Sales ==
Year	China
2023	2,638
2024	3,783
2025	3,999
