= Toyota Dynamic Force engine =

Engine series from Toyota

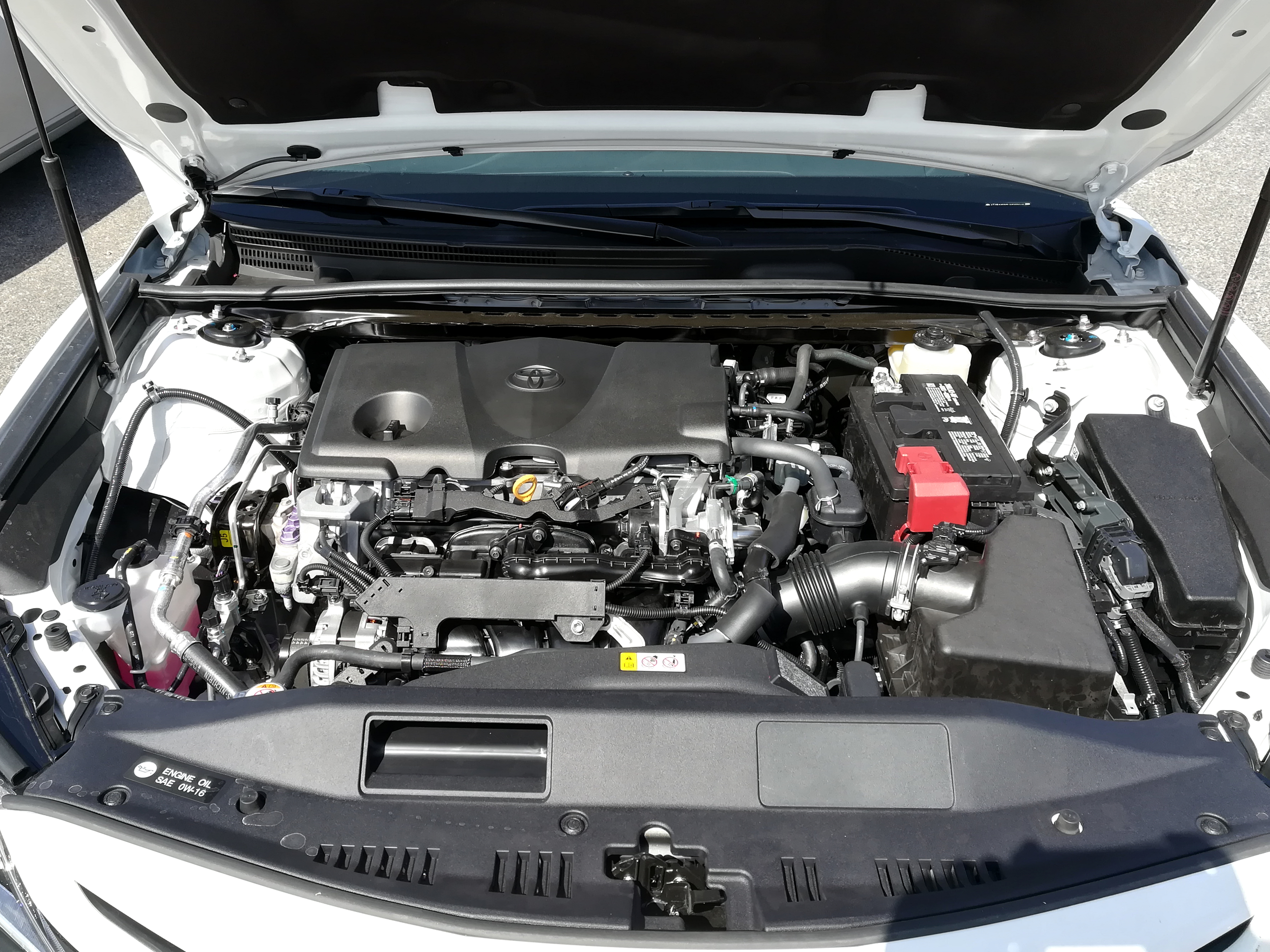
- Toyota's A25A-FKS straight-four engine installed in the XV70 series Camry, the first vehicle to offer a Dynamic Force engine

Overview
- Manufacturer: Toyota
- Production: 2017–present

Layout
- Configuration: I3; I4; V6
- Displacement: 1,490–3,445 cc (90.9–210.2 cu in)
- Cylinder block material: Aluminium alloy
- Valvetrain: DOHC

Combustion
- Fuel system: Fuel injection
- Fuel type: Petrol; petrol hybrid; ethanol
- Cooling system: Water-cooled

The Toyota Dynamic Force engine is a family of internal combustion engines developed by Toyota under its Toyota New Global Architecture (TNGA) strategy. These I3, I4 and V6 engines can be operated with petrol (gasoline) or ethanol (flex-fuel) and can be combined with electric motors in a hybrid drivetrain. The engines were designed alongside the TNGA vehicle platforms as part of a company-wide effort to simplify the vehicles being produced by Toyota and Lexus. The series debuted in June 2017 with the A25A four-cylinder engine, introduced in the XV70 series Camry.

== Overview ==
Dynamic Force was developed as an engine that is claimed to achieve both driving performance and environmental performance while pursuing high efficiency and low fuel consumption as well as having a "direct feeling, smooth and pleasant acceleration performance".

Specifically, the cylinder head and intake port design improves the tumble flow (longitudinal vortex) to increase the air intake volume–the majority of intake flow is across that portion of the valve closest to cylinder centreline. Other methods include:

- Expansion of the valve clamping angle. The angle between intake and exhaust valve centreline is 41 degrees–the previous design was 31 degrees.
- Hydraulic variable valve timing on both intake and exhaust camshafts.
- Very high compression-moderated Atkinson cycle engine.
- Longer stroke to bore ratio (under-square design).
- Change of port end shape and expansion of seat inner diameter.
- Application of updated D-4S (multi-hole injector) system to achieve "high-speed combustion", resulting in thermal efficiency over 40%.
- Cylinder centreline is offset from crankshaft centreline, meaning that piston top dead center is always equivalent to several degrees of crankshaft rotation.

In development and production of the engine, Toyota claims it would be a "completely new engine design based on the TNGA strategy".

Previously, Toyota offered about 800 engine variants, most of which would be replaced with a much simpler lineup of 17 versions of nine Dynamic Force engines. Toyota is also simplifying its lineup of transmissions, hybrid systems, and all-wheel drive systems.

Starting with the four-cylinder A25A type installed in XV70 series Camry in June 2017, the V6 V35A and four-cylinder M20A types had also appeared. On 16 October 2019, the three-cylinder M15A type, which would be installed in the XP210 series Yaris (specifically designed for Japan, Europe, Australia, and New Zealand), was officially announced. On 12 June 2021, the first turbocharged four-cylinder model, named T24A, was introduced for the AZ20 series Lexus NX.

The Dynamic Force engines introduced an updated nomenclature system for Toyota engines and no longer employ the traditional iteration or generation of the engine followed by the one letter or two letter designation for the engine family (such as 5M-GE or 4GR-FE being from the M and GR engine families respectively) and instead incorporate the engine's displacement in between a two letter code such as the M20A, with the "20" denoting a 2.0-litre engine.

== Common key technologies ==
- High speed combustion technologies:
  - Long stroke (stroke/bore ≈ 1.2)
  - Wider angle between the intake and exhaust valve
  - High efficiency intake port with laser cladded valve seat
  - High compression ratio up to 14.0:1
  - High energy ignition coil
  - Updated D-4S system
  - Multi-hole direct injector
- Variable cooling system:
  - Motor driven water pump
  - Heated thermostat
- Continuous variable-capacity oil pump
- Low viscosity engine oil
- Water jacket spacer
- Piston with laser pit skirt
- Drilled passage between cylinder bores
- VVT-iE
- Small-concave-profile camshaft
- Compact HLA
- High strength connecting rod
- High response intake air control
- Fuel injection control (multi-injection)
- Cylinder heads with built-in EGR cooler function
- Updated catalyst
- Change of exhaust manifold layout
- Piston oil jet control

== M15 family ==
M15 family
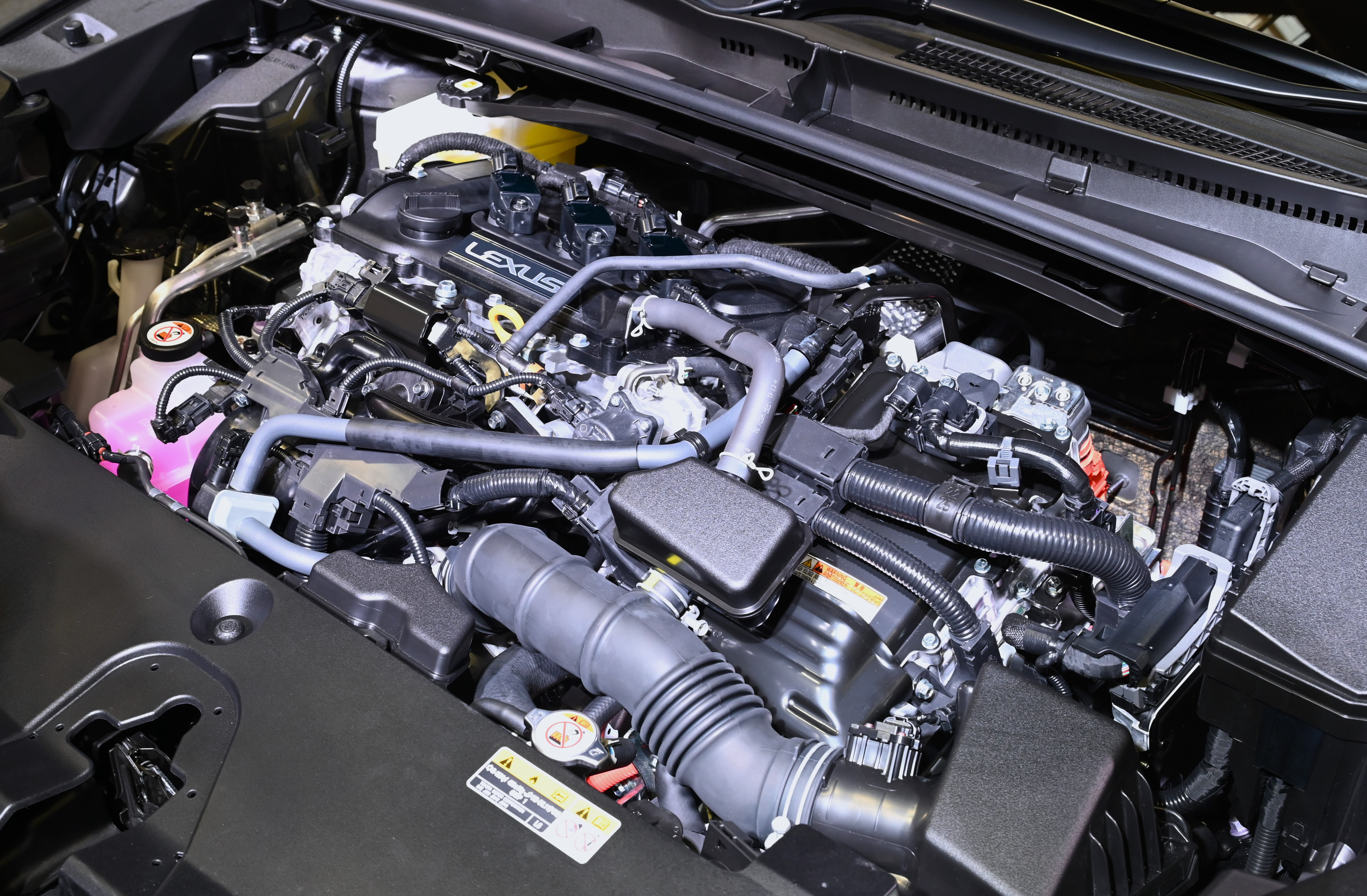
- M15A-FXE engine in a 2023 Lexus LBX

Overview
- Production: 2020–present

Layout
- Configuration: I3
- Displacement: 1,490 cc (90.9 cu in)
- Cylinder bore: 80.5 mm (3.169 in)
- Piston stroke: 97.6 mm (3.843 in)
- Compression ratio: 13.0:1 (M15A-FKS); 14.0:1 (M15A-FXE)

Combustion
- Fuel system: Fuel injection
- Fuel type: Petrol (M15A-FKS/M15B-FKS/M15C-FKS); Petrol hybrid (M15A-FXE/M15D-FXE)

Output
- Power output: 88–92 kW (118–123 hp) (M15A-FKS/M15B-FKS/M15C-FKS); 67 kW (90 hp) (M15A-FXE/M15D-FXE)
- Specific power: 59.1–61.7 kW (79–83 hp) per litre (M15A-FKS/M15B-FKS/M15C-FKS); 45 kW (60 hp) per litre (M15A-FXE/M15D-FXE)
- Torque output: 145–153 N⋅m (107–113 lb⋅ft) (M15A-FKS/M15B-FKS/M15C-FKS); 120 N⋅m (89 lb⋅ft) (M15A-FXE/M15D-FXE)

Chronology
- Predecessor: 1NR-FKE/1NZ-FE/1ZR-FE/1ZR-FAE/2NR-FKE/2NZ-FE/8NR-FTS (M15A-FKS) (I4); 1NZ-FXE (M15A-FXE) (I4)

The M15 engine family is a straight-three engine series that was first introduced in 2019 for the XP210 series Yaris.

Model	Applications	Vehicle chassis code	Power	Torque	Calendar years	Notes
M15A-FKS	Yaris	MXPA10; MXPA11; MXPA15	88 kW (118 hp) at 6,600 rpm Europe: 92 kW (123 hp) at 6,600 rpm	145 N⋅m (107 lb⋅ft) at 4,800–5,200 rpm Europe: 153 N⋅m (113 lb⋅ft) at 4,800–5,000 rpm	2020–present	Japan, Australia, and New Zealand
M15A-FKS	GR Yaris RS	MXPA12	88 kW (118 hp) at 6,600 rpm	145 N⋅m (107 lb⋅ft) at 4,800–5,200 rpm	2020–2023	Japan only
M15A-FKS	Corolla	MZEA11; MZEA17	92 kW (123 hp) at 6,600 rpm	153 N⋅m (113 lb⋅ft) at 4,800–5,000 rpm	2020–2025 (Japan〈MZEA17〉：2022-2025)	
M15A-FKS	Yaris Cross	MXPB10; MXPB15	88 kW (118 hp) at 6,600 rpm	145 N⋅m (107 lb⋅ft) at 4,800–5,200 rpm	2020–present	
M15A-FKS	Sienta	MXPC10	88 kW (118 hp) at 6,600 rpm	145 N⋅m (107 lb⋅ft) at 4,800–5,200 rpm	2022–present	Japan only
M15A-FXE	Yaris Hybrid / Mazda2 Hybrid	MXPH10; MXPH11; MXPH15	67 kW (90 hp) at 5,500 rpm	120 N⋅m (89 lb⋅ft) at 3,800–4,800 rpm	2020–present	The Mazda2 Hybrid went on sale since 2022
M15A-FXE	Aqua	MXPK10; MXPK11; MXPK15; MXPK16	67 kW (90 hp) at 5,500 rpm	120 N⋅m (89 lb⋅ft) at 3,800–4,800 rpm	2021–present	Japan only
M15A-FXE	Yaris Cross Hybrid	MXPJ10; MXPJ15	67 kW (90 hp) at 5,500 rpm	120 N⋅m (89 lb⋅ft) at 3,800–4,800 rpm	2020–present	
M15A-FXE	Sienta Hybrid	MXPL10; MXPL15	67 kW (90 hp) at 5,500 rpm	120 N⋅m (89 lb⋅ft) at 3,800–4,800 rpm	2022–present	Japan only
M15A-FXE	Lexus LBX	MAYH10; MAYH15	67 kW (90 hp) at 5,500 rpm	120 N⋅m (89 lb⋅ft) at 3,800–4,800 rpm	2023–present	
M15A-FXE	Aygo X Hybrid	MABH70	67 kW (90 hp) at 5,500 rpm	120 N⋅m (89 lb⋅ft) at 3,800–4,800 rpm	2025–present	Europe only
M15B-FKS	Corolla	MZEA11	92 kW (123 hp) at 6,600 rpm	153 N⋅m (113 lb⋅ft) at 4,800–5,000 rpm	2021–2025	China only
M15C-FKS	Levin	MZEA11	92 kW (123 hp) at 6,600 rpm	153 N⋅m (113 lb⋅ft) at 4,800–5,000 rpm	2021–2025	China only
M15D-FXE	Urban Cruiser Hyryder Hybrid / Suzuki Grand Vitara Hybrid		67 kW (90 hp) at 5,500 rpm	120 N⋅m (89 lb⋅ft) at 3,800–4,800 rpm	2022–present	India only
M15D-FXE	Suzuki Victoris Hybrid		67 kW (90 hp) at 5,500 rpm	120 N⋅m (89 lb⋅ft) at 3,800–4,800 rpm	2025–present	India only

=== M15A-FKS ===
The standard version with 13.0:1 compression ratio achieves 40% thermal efficiency.

Applications (calendar years):

- 2020–present Yaris (MXPA10/11/15)
- 2020–present GR Yaris RS (MXPA12)
- 2020–present Yaris Cross (MXPB10/15)
- 2020–present Corolla (MZEA11/17)
- 2022–present Sienta (MXPC10)

=== M15A-FXE ===
The hybrid version with 14.0:1 compression ratio achieves 41% thermal efficiency.

Applications (calendar years):

- 2020–present Yaris Hybrid / 2022–present Mazda2 Hybrid (MXPH10/11/15)
- 2020–present Yaris Cross Hybrid (MXPJ10/15)
- 2021–present Aqua (MXPK10/11/15/16)
- 2022–present Sienta Hybrid (MXPL10/15)
- 2023–present Lexus LBX (MAYH10/15)
- 2025–present Aygo X Hybrid

=== M15B-FKS ===
Localized M15 series engine for China, manufactured by FTCE (FAW Toyota Changchun Engine Co., Ltd.).

Applications (calendar years):

- 2021–present Corolla (MZEA11; China only)

=== M15C-FKS ===
Localized M15 series engine for China, manufactured by GTE (Guangqi Toyota Engine Co., Ltd.).

Applications (calendar years):

- 2021–present Levin (MZEA11)

=== M15D-FXE ===
The hybrid version produced in Jigani, Bangalore, India by Toyota Industries Engine India (TIEI).

Applications (calendar years):

- 2022–present Urban Cruiser Hyryder Hybrid / Suzuki Grand Vitara Hybrid
- 2025–present Suzuki Victoris Hybrid

== M20 family ==
M20 family
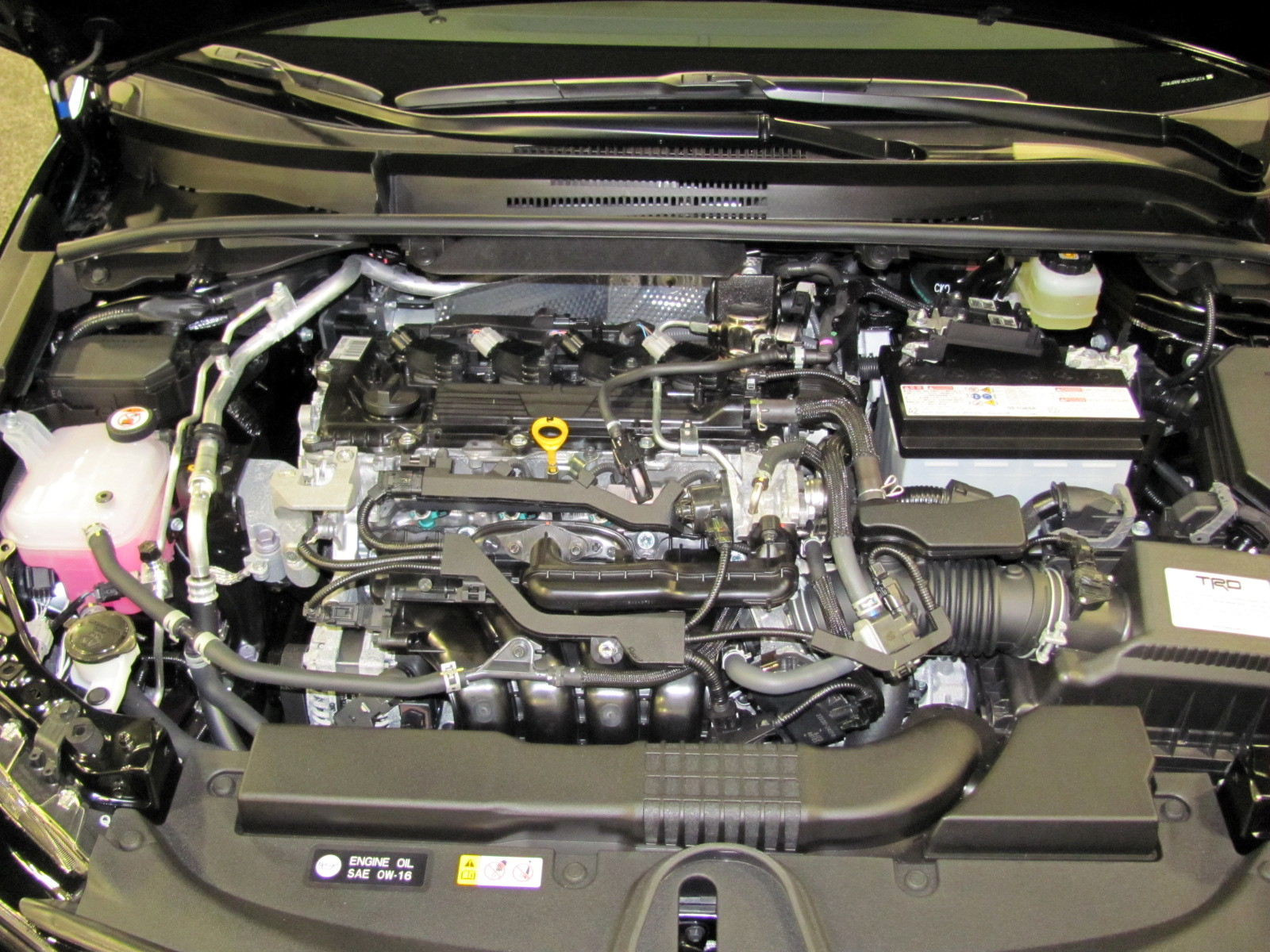
- M20A-FKS engine in the 2019 Corolla hatchback

Overview
- Production: 2018–present

Layout
- Configuration: I4
- Displacement: 1,986 cc (121.2 cu in)
- Cylinder bore: 80.5 mm (3.169 in)
- Piston stroke: 97.6 mm (3.843 in)
- Compression ratio: 13.0:1 (M20A-FKS/M20A-FKB); 14.0:1 (M20A-FXS)

Combustion
- Fuel system: D-4S direct/port injection
- Fuel type: Petrol (M20A-FKS); Petrol flex fuel (M20A-FKB); Petrol hybrid (M20A-FXS)

Output
- Power output: 125–131 kW (168–176 hp) (M20A-FKS); 130 kW (174 hp) (M20A-FKB); 107–131 kW (143–176 hp) (M20A-FXS)
- Specific power: 62.9–66 kW (84–89 hp) per litre (M20A-FKS); 65.5 kW (88 hp) per litre (M20A-FKB); 53.9–66 kW (72–89 hp) per litre (M20A-FXS)
- Torque output: 200–210 N⋅m (148–155 lb⋅ft) (M20A-FKS); 210 N⋅m (155 lb⋅ft) (M20A-FKB); 188–190 N⋅m (139–140 lb⋅ft) (M20A-FXS)

Emissions
- Emissions control systems: ULEV50

Chronology
- Predecessor: 2ZR-FE/2ZR-FAE/3ZR-FE/3ZR-FAE/6AR-FSE/1TR-FE (M20A-FKS); 2ZR-FXE (M20A-FXS)

The M20 engine family is a straight-four engine series that was first introduced in 2018 for the E210 series Corolla.

Model	Applications	Vehicle chassis code	Power	Torque	Calendar years	Notes
M20A-FKS	Corolla/Auris	MZEA12	125 kW (168 hp) at 6,600 rpm	202 N⋅m (149 lb⋅ft) at 4,800 rpm	2018–present	Used in Auris exclusively in Taiwan until July 2020.
M20A-FKS	Camry	MXVA71	131 kW (176 hp) at 6,600 rpm	210 N⋅m (155 lb⋅ft) at 4,400–5,200 rpm	2019–present	
M20A-FKS	Avalon	MXXA50	131 kW (176 hp) at 6,600 rpm	210 N⋅m (155 lb⋅ft) at 4,400–5,200 rpm	2019–present	
M20A-FKS	C-HR	MAXA10	126 kW (169 hp) at 6,600 rpm	203 N⋅m (150 lb⋅ft) at 4,400–4,800 rpm	2018–present	
M20A-FKS	Corolla Cross	MXGA10; MXGA15	126 kW (169 hp) at 6,600 rpm	203 N⋅m (150 lb⋅ft) at 4,400–4,800 rpm	2021–present	North America only
M20A-FKS	RAV4	MXAA52	126 kW (169 hp) at 6,600 rpm Australia: 127 kW (170 hp) at 6,600 rpm	207 N⋅m (153 lb⋅ft) at 4,800 rpm Australia: 203 N⋅m (150 lb⋅ft) at 4,400–4,900 rpm	2018–present	
M20A-FKS	Harrier/Venza	MXUA80; MXUA85	126 kW (169 hp) at 6,600 rpm	207 N⋅m (153 lb⋅ft) at 4,800 rpm	2020–present	Venza is available in North America since 2021.
M20A-FKS	Noah/Voxy / Suzuki Landy	MZRA90; MZRA95	125 kW (168 hp) at 6,600 rpm	202 N⋅m (149 lb⋅ft) at 4,900 rpm	2022–present	Suzuki Landy is only available in Japan
M20A-FKS	Innova / Innova HyCross / Kijang Innova Zenix	MAGA10	128 kW (172 hp) at 6,600 rpm	205 N⋅m (151 lb⋅ft) at 4,500–4,900 rpm	2022–present	
M20A-FKS	Lexus ES 200	MXZA10	128 kW (172 hp) at 6,600 rpm	209 N⋅m (154 lb⋅ft) at 4,000–5,200 rpm	2020–present	
M20A-FKS	Lexus UX 200	MZAA10	128 kW (172 hp) at 6,600 rpm	209 N⋅m (154 lb⋅ft) at 4,000–5,200 rpm	2018–present	
M20A-FKB	Corolla	MZEA12	130 kW (174 hp) at 6,600 rpm	210 N⋅m (155 lb⋅ft) at 4,400 rpm	2020–present	Brazil only
M20A-FKB	Corolla Cross	MXGA10	130 kW (174 hp) at 6,600 rpm	210 N⋅m (155 lb⋅ft) at 4,400 rpm	2021–present	Brazil only
M20A-FXS	Corolla Hybrid	MZEH12	112 kW (150 hp) at 6,000 rpm	190 N⋅m (140 lb⋅ft) at 4,400–5,200 rpm	2018–present	Europe only
M20A-FXS	Prius	MXWH60; MXWH65	112 kW (150 hp) at 6,000 rpm	188 N⋅m (139 lb⋅ft) at 4,400–5,200 rpm	2022–present	
M20A-FXS	C-HR Hybrid	MAXH10	112 kW (150 hp) at 6,000 rpm	190 N⋅m (140 lb⋅ft) at 4,400–5,200 rpm	2020–present	Europe only
M20A-FXS	Corolla Cross Hybrid	MXGH10; MXGH15	131 kW (176 hp) at 6,600 rpm (FWD); 113 kW (152 hp) at 6,000 rpm (AWD)	202 N⋅m (149 lb⋅ft) at 4,400–4,900 rpm (FWD); 190 N⋅m (140 lb⋅ft) at 4,400–5,200 rpm (AWD)	2022–present	North America, Europe, Australia and New Zealand only
M20A-FXS	Innova Hybrid / Innova HyCross Hybrid / Kijang Innova Zenix Hybrid	MAGH10	137 kW (184 hp) at 6,000 rpm	206 N⋅m (152 lb⋅ft) at 4,400–5,200 rpm	2022–present	
M20A-FXS	Lexus UX 250h/260h	MZAH10; MZAH15	107 kW (143 hp) at 6,000 rpm	188 N⋅m (139 lb⋅ft) at 4,400 rpm	2018–present	Known as UX 260h in China
M20B-FXS	IZOA Hybrid	MAXH10	112 kW (150 hp) at 6,000 rpm	190 N⋅m (140 lb⋅ft) at 4,400–5,200 rpm	2020–2022	
M20C-FKS	C-HR	MAXA10	126 kW (169 hp) at 6,600 rpm	203 N⋅m (150 lb⋅ft) at 4,400–4,800 rpm	2018–present	China only
M20C-FKS	Camry	MXVA71	131 kW (176 hp) at 6,600 rpm	210 N⋅m (155 lb⋅ft) at 4,400–5,200 rpm	2019–present	China only
M20C-FKS	Wildlander	MXAA54	126 kW (169 hp) at 6,600 rpm	209 N⋅m (154 lb⋅ft) at 4,400–5,000 rpm	2020–present	
M20C-FKS	Venza	MXUA85	126 kW (169 hp) at 6,600 rpm	207 N⋅m (153 lb⋅ft) at 4,800 rpm	2021–present	China only
M20C-FKS	Levin GT	MZEA12	131 kW (176 hp) at 6,600 rpm	210 N⋅m (155 lb⋅ft) at 4,400–5,200 rpm	2021–present	
M20C-FKS	Frontlander	MXGA15	126 kW (169 hp) at 6,600 rpm	203 N⋅m (150 lb⋅ft) at 4,400–4,800 rpm	2022–present	
M20C-FKS	Camry	MXVA80L			2023–present	China only
M20D-FKS	RAV4	MXAA52	126 kW (169 hp) at 6,600 rpm	209 N⋅m (154 lb⋅ft) at 4,400–5,000 rpm	2018–present	China only
M20D-FKS	Avalon	MXXA50	131 kW (176 hp) at 6,600 rpm	210 N⋅m (155 lb⋅ft) at 4,400–5,200 rpm	2019–present	China only
M20D-FKS	Harrier	MXUA80	126 kW (169 hp) at 6,600 rpm	207 N⋅m (153 lb⋅ft) at 4,800 rpm	2021–present	China only
M20E-FKS	IZOA	MAXA10	126 kW (169 hp) at 6,600 rpm	203 N⋅m (150 lb⋅ft) at 4,400–4,800 rpm	2018–present	
M20E-FKS	Allion	MZEA12	131 kW (176 hp) at 6,600 rpm	210 N⋅m (155 lb⋅ft) at 4,400–5,200 rpm	2021–present	
M20E-FKS	Corolla Cross	MXGA10	126 kW (169 hp) at 6,600 rpm	203 N⋅m (150 lb⋅ft) at 4,400–4,800 rpm	2022–present	China only
M20F-FXS	C-HR Hybrid	MAXH10	112 kW (150 hp) at 6,000 rpm	190 N⋅m (140 lb⋅ft) at 4,400–5,200 rpm	2020–present	China only
M20F-FXS	Camry	MXVH80L			2023–present	China only
M20G-FXS	IZOA Hybrid	MAXH10	131 kW (176 hp) at 6,600 rpm	202 N⋅m (149 lb⋅ft) at 4,400–4,900 rpm	2022–present	
M20G-FXS	Allion Hybrid	MZEA12	131 kW (176 hp) at 6,600 rpm	202 N⋅m (149 lb⋅ft) at 4,400–4,900 rpm	2023–present	
M20G-FXS	Corolla Cross Hybrid	MXGA10	131 kW (176 hp) at 6,600 rpm	202 N⋅m (149 lb⋅ft) at 4,400–4,900 rpm	2023–present	China only

=== M20A-FKS ===
The standard version with 13.0:1 compression ratio achieves 40% thermal efficiency.

Applications (calendar years):

- 2018–present Corolla / 2018–2020 Auris (MZEA12)
- 2018–present C-HR (MAXA10)
- 2018–present RAV4 (MXAA52)
- 2018–present Lexus UX 200 (MZAA10)
- 2019–present Camry (MXVA71)
- 2019–present Avalon (MXXA50)
- 2020–present Lexus ES 200 (MXZA10)
- 2020–present Harrier / 2022–present Venza (MXUA80/85)
- 2021–present Corolla Cross (MXGA10/15)
- 2022–present Noah/Voxy / Suzuki Landy (MZRA90/95)
- 2022–present Innova / Innova HyCross / Kijang Innova Zenix (MAGA10)

=== M20A-FKB ===
The flex fuel E22-E100 version with 13.0:1 compression ratio ethanol fuel capable.

Applications (calendar years):

- 2020–present Corolla (MZEA12)
- 2021–present Corolla Cross (MXGA10)

=== M20A-FXS ===
The hybrid version with 14.0:1 compression ratio achieves 41% thermal efficiency.

Applications (calendar years):

- 2018–present Corolla Hybrid (MZEH12)
- 2018–present Lexus UX 250h/260h (MZAH10/15)
- 2020–present C-HR Hybrid (MAXH10)
- 2022–present Corolla Cross Hybrid (MXGH10/15)
- 2022–present Prius (MXWH60/65)
- 2022–present Innova / Innova HyCross Hybrid / Kijang Innova Zenix Hybrid (MAGH10)

=== M20B-FXS ===
Version used only in China which is largely identical to the M20A-FXS engine, manufactured by FTCE (FAW Toyota Changchun Engine Co., Ltd.).

Applications (calendar years):

- 2020–2022 IZOA Hybrid (MAXH10)

=== M20C-FKS ===
Localized M20 series engine for China, manufactured by GTE (Guangqi Toyota Engine Co., Ltd.).

Applications (calendar years):

- 2018–present C-HR (MAXA10; China only)
- 2019–present Camry (MXVA71)
- 2020–present Wildlander (MXAA54)
- 2021–present Venza (MXUA85; China only)
- 2021–present Levin GT (MZEA12)
- 2022–present Frontlander (MXGA15)
- 2023–present Camry (MXVA80L)

=== M20D-FKS ===
Localized M20 series engine for China, manufactured by FTCE (FAW Toyota Changchun Engine Co., Ltd.).

Applications (calendar years):

- 2018–present RAV4 (MXAA52; China only)
- 2019–present Avalon (MXXA50; China only)
- 2021–present Harrier (MXUA80; China only)

=== M20E-FKS ===
Localized M20 series engine for China, manufactured by FTCE (FAW Toyota Changchun Engine Co., Ltd.).

Applications (calendar years):

- 2018–present IZOA (MAXA10)
- 2021–present Allion (MZEA12)
- 2022–present Corolla Cross (MXGA10; China only)

=== M20F-FXS ===
Version used only in China which is largely identical to the M20A-FXS engine, manufactured by GTE (Guangqi Toyota Engine Co., Ltd.).

Applications (calendar years):

- 2020–present C-HR Hybrid (MAXH10; China only)
- 2023–present Levin GT Hybrid (MZEH16; China only)
- 2023–present Frontlander Hybrid (MXGH10; China only)
- 2023–present Camry Hybrid (MXVH80; China only)

=== M20G-FXS ===
Version used only in China which is largely identical to the M20A-FXS engine, manufactured by FTCE (FAW Toyota Changchun Engine Co., Ltd.).

Applications (calendar years):

- 2022–present IZOA Hybrid (MAXH10; China only)
- 2023–present Allion Hybrid (MZEH16; China only)
- 2023–present Corolla Cross Hybrid (MXGH10; China only)

== S20A ==
S20A
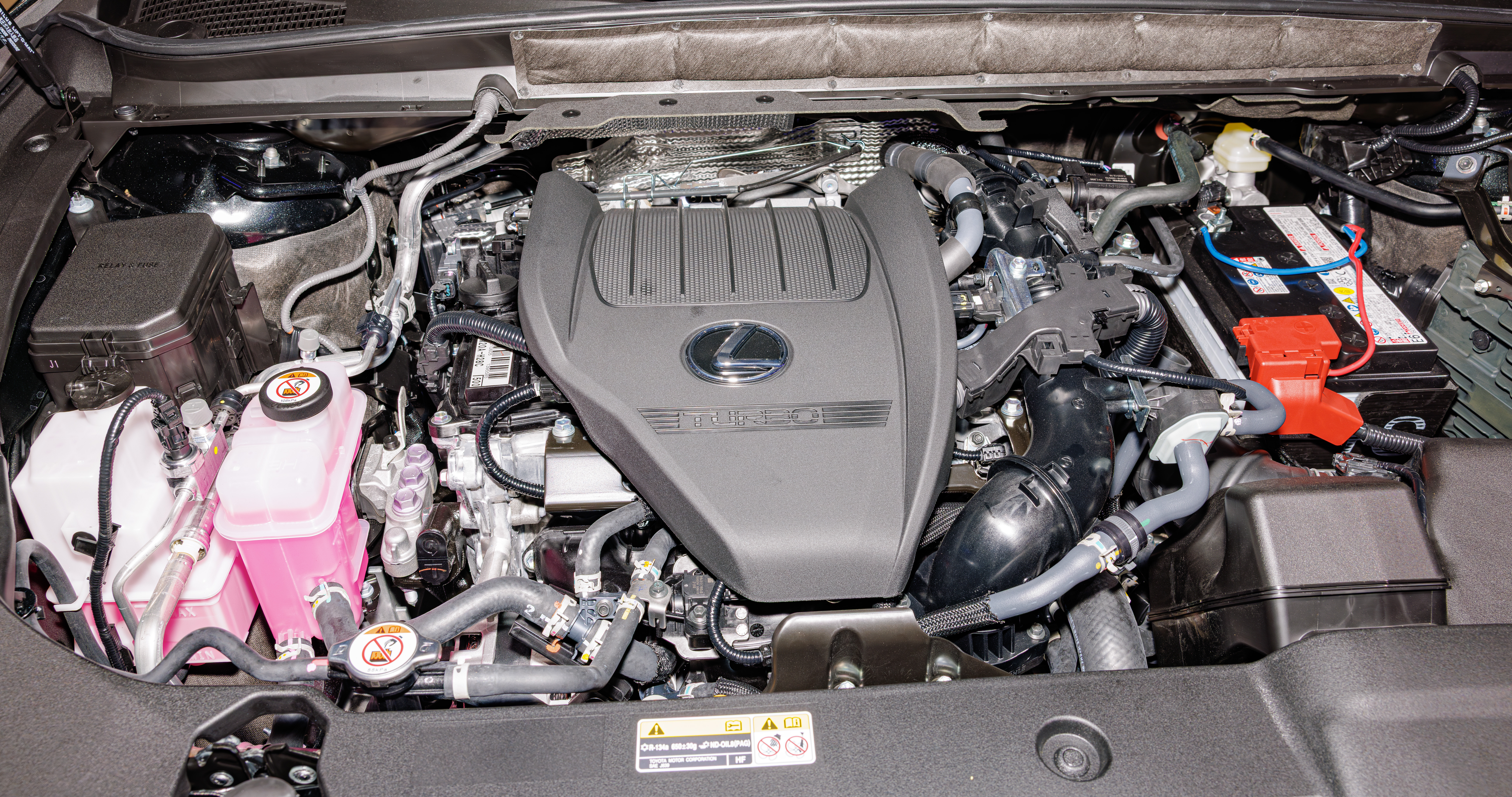
- S20A-FTS engine in the Lexus RX 300 (SALA15)

Overview
- Production: 2022–present

Layout
- Configuration: I4
- Displacement: 1,997 cc (121.9 cu in)
- Cylinder bore: 85.0 mm (3.346 in)
- Piston stroke: 88.0 mm (3.465 in)

Combustion
- Turbocharger: Single
- Fuel system: D-4ST direct/port injection
- Fuel type: Petrol

Output
- Power output: 182 kW (244 hp)
- Specific power: 91.1 kW (122 hp) per litre
- Torque output: 380 N⋅m (280 lb⋅ft)

Chronology
- Predecessor: 8AR-FTS

The S20A engine is a straight-four engine series that was first introduced in 2022 for the Chinese market Highlander / Crown Kluger.

Model	Applications	Vehicle chassis code	Power	Torque	Calendar years	Notes
S20A-FTS	Highlander / Crown Kluger /	SXUA75	182 kW (244 hp) at 6,000 rpm	380 N⋅m (280 lb⋅ft) at 1,800–4,000 rpm	2022–present	China only
S20A-FTS	Lexus RX 300	SALA15	182 kW (244 hp) at 6,000 rpm	380 N⋅m (280 lb⋅ft) at 1,800–4,000 rpm	2024–present	China only

=== S20A-FTS ===
"FTS" designates the turbocharged version of this engine.

Applications (calendar years):

- 2022–present Highlander / Crown Kluger (SXUA75)
- 2024-present Lexus RX 300 (SALA15)

== A25 family ==
A25 family
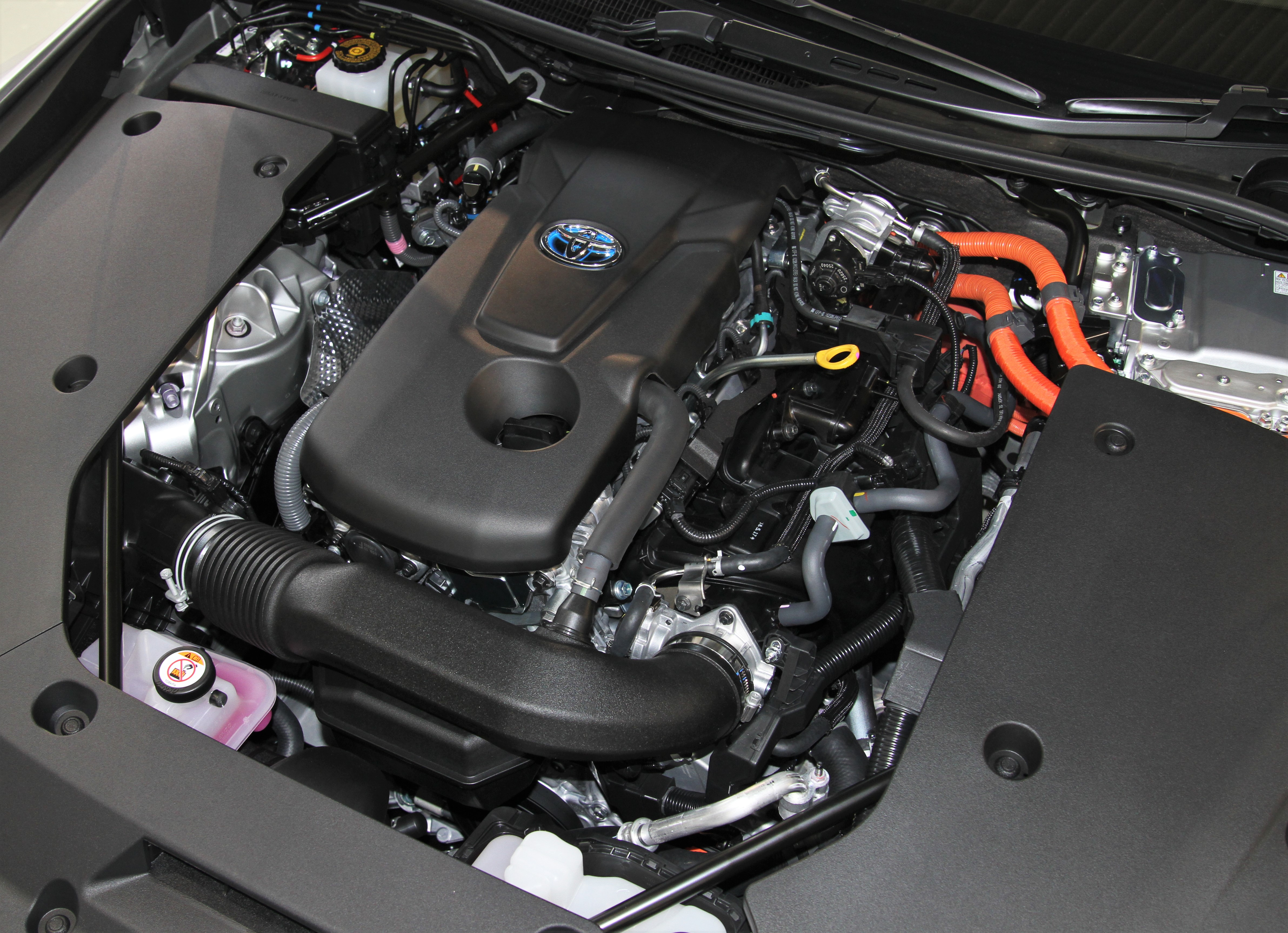
- A25A-FXS engine in the 2018 Crown Hybrid

Overview
- Production: 2017–present

Layout
- Configuration: I4
- Displacement: 2,487 cc (151.8 cu in)
- Cylinder bore: 87.5 mm (3.445 in)
- Piston stroke: 103.4 mm (4.071 in)
- Compression ratio: 13.0:1 (A25A-FKS/A25A-FKB); 14.0:1 (A25A-FXS/A25B-FXS)

Combustion
- Fuel system: D-4S direct/port injection
- Fuel type: Petrol (A25A-FKS); Petrol flex fuel (A25A-FKB); Petrol hybrid (A25A-FXS/A25B-FXS)

Output
- Power output: 151–154 kW (202–207 hp) (A25A-FKS); 154 kW (207 hp) (A25A-FKB); 130–139 kW (174–186 hp) (A25A-FXS/A25B-FXS)
- Specific power: 60.7–61.9 kW (81–83 hp) per litre (A25A-FKS); 61.9 kW (83 hp) per litre (A25A-FKB); 52.3–55.9 kW (70–75 hp) per litre (A25A-FXS/A25B-FXS)
- Torque output: 247–252 N⋅m (182–186 lb⋅ft) (A25A-FKS); 250 N⋅m (184 lb⋅ft) (A25A-FKB); 219–237 N⋅m (162–175 lb⋅ft) (A25A-FXS/A25B-FXS)

Chronology
- Predecessor: 2AR-FE/5AR-FE (A25A-FKS); 2AR-FSE/2AR-FXE (A25A-FXS/A25B-FXS)

The A25 engine family is a straight-four engine series that was first introduced in 2017 for the XV70 series Camry.

Model	Applications	Vehicle chassis code	Power	Torque	Calendar years	Notes
A25A-FKS	Camry	AXVA70; AXVA75	151.5–153.5 kW (203–206 hp) at 6,600 rpm (FWD); 151 kW (202 hp) at 6,600 rpm (AWD)	249–252 N⋅m (184–186 lb⋅ft) at 5,000 rpm (FWD); 247 N⋅m (182 lb⋅ft) at 4,400 rpm (AWD)	2017–2024	
A25A-FKS	Avalon	AXXA50; AXXA55	153–154 kW (205–207 hp) at 6,600 rpm	250 N⋅m (184 lb⋅ft) at 5,000 rpm	2018–present	AWD models offered between 2020 and 2022.
A25A-FKS	RAV4	AXAA52; AXAA54	US: 151.5 kW (203 hp) at 6,600 rpm Australia: 152 kW (204 hp) at 6,600 rpm	US: 249 N⋅m (184 lb⋅ft) at 5,000 rpm Australia: 243 N⋅m (179 lb⋅ft) at 4,000–5,000 rpm	2018–present	
A25A-FKS	Lexus ES 250/260	AXZA10; AXZA15	151–152 kW (202–204 hp) at 6,600 rpm	247 N⋅m (182 lb⋅ft) at 5,000 rpm	2018–present	Known as ES 260 in China
A25A-FKS	Lexus NX 250/260	AAZA20; AAZA25	151–152 kW (202–204 hp) at 6,600 rpm	247 N⋅m (182 lb⋅ft) at 5,000 rpm	2021–present	Known as NX 260 in China
A25A-FKS	Camry	AXVA80			2024–present	
A25A-FKB	Camry	AXVA70	154 kW (207 hp) at 6,600 rpm	250 N⋅m (184 lb⋅ft) at 5,000 rpm	2018–present	Thailand only
A25A-FXS	Camry Hybrid/Daihatsu Altis	AXVH70; AXVH75	131 kW (176 hp) at 5,700 rpm	221 N⋅m (163 lb⋅ft) at 3,600–5,200 rpm	2017–present	Daihatsu Altis is only available in Japan
A25A-FXS	Avalon Hybrid	AXXH50	131 kW (176 hp) at 5,700 rpm	221 N⋅m (163 lb⋅ft) at 3,600–5,200 rpm	2018–present	
A25A-FXS	Crown Hybrid	AZSH20; AZSH21	135 kW (181 hp) at 6,000 rpm	221 N⋅m (163 lb⋅ft) at 3,800–5,400 rpm	2018–2022	
A25A-FXS	Crown Crossover Hybrid	AZSH35	137 kW (184 hp) at 6,000 rpm	221 N⋅m (163 lb⋅ft) at 3,600–5,200 rpm	2022–present	
A25A-FXS	Crown Sedan Hybrid	AZSH32	136 kW (182 hp) at 6,000 rpm	225 N⋅m (166 lb⋅ft) at 4,200–5,000 rpm	2023–present	
A25A-FXS	Crown Sport Hybrid	AZSH36	137 kW (184 hp) at 6,000 rpm	221 N⋅m (163 lb⋅ft) at 3,600–5,200 rpm	2022–present	
A25A-FXS	RAV4 Hybrid	AXAH52; AXAH54	131 kW (176 hp) at 5,700 rpm	221 N⋅m (163 lb⋅ft) at 3,600–5,200 rpm	2018–present	Except China
A25A-FXS	RAV4 Plug-in Hybrid/Prime / Suzuki Across	AXAP52; AXAP54	130 kW (174 hp) at 6,000 rpm	Japan: 219 N⋅m (162 lb⋅ft) at 3,600 rpm US: 228 N⋅m (168 lb⋅ft) at 2,800 rpm	2020–present	Suzuki Across is only available in Europe since 2021.
A25A-FXS	Harrier Hybrid / Venza	AXUH80; AXUH85	131 kW (176 hp) at 5,700 rpm	221 N⋅m (163 lb⋅ft) at 3,600–5,200 rpm	2020–present	
A25A-FXS	Harrier Plug-in Hybrid	AXUP80	134 kW (180 hp) at 5,700 rpm	221 N⋅m (163 lb⋅ft) at 3,600–5,200 rpm	2022–present	
A25A-FXS	Highlander Hybrid / Kluger Hybrid	AXUH70; AXUH78	139 kW (186 hp) at 6,000 rpm	237 N⋅m (175 lb⋅ft) at 4,400 rpm	2019–present	Except China. Kluger Hybrid is only available in Australia since 2021
A25A-FXS	Grand Highlander Hybrid	AASH10; AASH15	139 kW (186 hp) at 6,000 rpm	237 N⋅m (175 lb⋅ft) at 4,400 rpm	2023–present	
A25A-FXS	Sienna	AXLH40; AXLH45	139 kW (186 hp) at 6,000 rpm	237 N⋅m (175 lb⋅ft) at 4,400 rpm	2020–present	
A25A-FXS	Alphard Hybrid/Vellfire Hybrid	AAHH40; AAHH45	140 kW (188 hp) at 6,000 rpm	236 N⋅m (174 lb⋅ft) at 4,300–4,500 rpm	2023–present	
A25A-FXS	Lexus ES 300h	AXZH10; AXZH11	131 kW (176 hp) at 5,700 rpm	221 N⋅m (163 lb⋅ft) at 3,600–5,200 rpm	2018–present	Except China
A25A-FXS	Lexus NX 350h	AAZH20; AAZH25	140 kW (188 hp) at 6,000 rpm	243 N⋅m (179 lb⋅ft) at 4,300–4,500 rpm	2021–present	Except China
A25A-FXS	Lexus NX 450h+	AAZH26	136 kW (182 hp) at 6,000 rpm	228 N⋅m (168 lb⋅ft) at 3,600–3,700 rpm	2021–present	Except China
A25A-FXS	Lexus RX 350h	AALH10; AALH15	140 kW (188 hp) at 6,000 rpm	243 N⋅m (179 lb⋅ft) at 4,300–4,500 rpm	2022–present	
A25A-FXS	Lexus RX 450h+	AALH16	136 kW (182 hp) at 6,000 rpm	228 N⋅m (168 lb⋅ft) at 3,600–3,700 rpm	2022–present	
A25A-FXS	Lexus LM 350h	AAWH10; AAWH15	140 kW (188 hp) at 6,000 rpm	236 N⋅m (174 lb⋅ft) at 4,300–4,500 rpm	2023–present	
A25A-FXS	Camry Hybrid	AXVH80; AXVH85			2024–present	
A25A-FXS	Crown Signia	AZSH38			2024–present	
A25B-FXS	Lexus ES 300h (China)	AXZH10	131 kW (176 hp) at 5,700 rpm	221 N⋅m (163 lb⋅ft) at 3,600–5,200 rpm	2018–present	Engine exclusively used on the Chinese Lexus models
A25B-FXS	Lexus NX 350h (China)	AAZH10	141 kW (189 hp) at 6,000 rpm	243 N⋅m (179 lb⋅ft) at 4,300–4,500 rpm	2022–present	Engine exclusively used on the Chinese Lexus models
A25B-FXS	Lexus NX 400h+	AXZH11	136 kW (182 hp) at 6,000 rpm	228 N⋅m (168 lb⋅ft) at 3,600–3,700 rpm	2022–present	Engine exclusively used on the Chinese Lexus models
A25C-FKS	Camry	AXVA70	154 kW (207 hp) at 6,600 rpm	250 N⋅m (184 lb⋅ft) at 5,000 rpm	2018–present	Gasoline engine manufactured by GTE
A25C-FKS	Wildlander	AXAA54	154 kW (207 hp) at 6,600 rpm	250 N⋅m (184 lb⋅ft) at 5,000 rpm	2020–present	Gasoline engine manufactured by GTE
A25C-FKS	Highlander	AXUA70	154 kW (207 hp) at 6,600 rpm	250 N⋅m (184 lb⋅ft) at 5,000 rpm	2021–present	Gasoline engine manufactured by GTE
A25D-FXS	Camry Hybrid	AXVH70	131 kW (176 hp) at 5,700 rpm	221 N⋅m (163 lb⋅ft) at 3,600–5,200 rpm	2018–present	Hybrid engine manufactured by GTE
A25D-FXS	Wildlander Hybrid	AXAH54	131 kW (176 hp) at 5,700 rpm	221 N⋅m (163 lb⋅ft) at 3,600–5,200 rpm	2021–present	Hybrid engine manufactured by GTE
A25D-FXS	Wildlander PHV	AXAP54	132 kW (177 hp) at 6,000 rpm	224 N⋅m (165 lb⋅ft) at 3,600–3,700 rpm	2021–present	Hybrid engine manufactured by GTE
A25D-FXS	Highlander Hybrid	AXUH78	141 kW (189 hp) at 6,000 rpm	238 N⋅m (176 lb⋅ft) at 4,200–4,600 rpm	2021–present	Hybrid engine manufactured by GTE
A25D-FXS	Sienna Hybrid	AXLH40	141 kW (189 hp) at 6,000 rpm	238 N⋅m (176 lb⋅ft) at 4,200–4,600 rpm	2021–present	Hybrid engine manufactured by GTE
A25D-FXS	Venza Hybrid	AXUH85	131 kW (176 hp) at 5,700 rpm	221 N⋅m (163 lb⋅ft) at 3,600–5,200 rpm	2022–present	Hybrid engine manufactured by GTE
A25D-FXS	Camry Hybrid	AXVH80L			2023–present	Hybrid engine manufactured by GTE
A25D-FXS	Mazda CX-50 HEV				2023–present	Hybrid engine manufactured by GTE
A25F-FXS	RAV4 Hybrid	AXAH52	131 kW (176 hp) at 5,700 rpm	221 N⋅m (163 lb⋅ft) at 3,600–5,200 rpm	2021–present	Hybrid engine manufactured by FTCE
A25F-FXS	RAV4 PHV	AXAP52	132 kW (177 hp) at 6,000 rpm	224 N⋅m (165 lb⋅ft) at 3,600–3,700 rpm	2021–present	Hybrid engine manufactured by FTCE
A25F-FXS	Harrier Hybrid	AXUH80	131 kW (176 hp) at 5,700 rpm	221 N⋅m (163 lb⋅ft) at 3,600–5,200 rpm	2022–present	Hybrid engine manufactured by FTCE
A25G-FKS	Avalon	AXXA50	154 kW (207 hp) at 6,600 rpm	250 N⋅m (184 lb⋅ft) at 5,000 rpm	2019–present	Gasoline engine manufactured by FTCE
A25G-FKS	RAV4	AXAA52	154 kW (207 hp) at 6,600 rpm	250 N⋅m (184 lb⋅ft) at 5,000 rpm	2019–present	Gasoline engine manufactured by FTCE
A25G-FKS	Crown Kluger	AXUA71	154 kW (207 hp) at 6,600 rpm	250 N⋅m (184 lb⋅ft) at 5,000 rpm	2021–present	Gasoline engine manufactured by FTCE
A25H-FXS	Avalon Hybrid	AXXH50	131 kW (176 hp) at 5,700 rpm	221 N⋅m (163 lb⋅ft) at 3,600–5,200 rpm	2019–present	Hybrid Engine manufactured by FTCE
A25H-FXS	Crown Kluger Hybrid	AXUH79	141 kW (189 hp) at 6,000 rpm	238 N⋅m (176 lb⋅ft) at 4,200–4,600 rpm	2021–present	Hybrid Engine manufactured by FTCE
A25H-FXS	Granvia Hybrid	AXLH40	141 kW (189 hp) at 6,000 rpm	238 N⋅m (176 lb⋅ft) at 4,200–4,600 rpm	2021–present	Hybrid Engine manufactured by FTCE

=== A25A-FKS ===
The standard version with 13.0:1 compression ratio achieves 40% thermal efficiency.

Applications (calendar years):

- 2017–present Camry (AXVA70/75)
- 2018–2025 RAV4 (AXAA52/54)
- 2018–present Lexus ES 250/260 (AXZA10/15)
- 2018–2022 Avalon (AXXA50/55)
- 2021–present Lexus NX 250/260 (AAZA20/25)
- 2024–present Camry (AXVA80)

=== A25A-FKB ===
Version used in Thailand with E85 ethanol fuel capable.

Applications (calendar years):

- 2018–present Camry (AXVA70)

=== A25A-FXS ===
The hybrid version with 14.0:1 compression ratio achieves 41% thermal efficiency.

Applications (calendar years):

- 2017–present Camry Hybrid/Daihatsu Altis (AXVH70/75)
- 2018–present Avalon Hybrid (AXXH50)
- 2018–present RAV4 Hybrid (AXAH52/54)
- 2018–present Lexus ES 300h (AXZH10/11)
- 2018–2022 Crown Hybrid (AZSH20/21)
- 2022–present Crown Crossover Hybrid (AZSH35)
- 2023–present Crown Sedan Hybrid (AZSH32)
- 2023–present Crown Sport Hybrid (AZSH36)
- 2019–present Highlander Hybrid / 2021–present Kluger Hybrid (AXUH70/78)
- 2020–present RAV4 Plug-in Hybrid/Prime / Suzuki Across (AXAP52/54)
- 2020–present Harrier Hybrid/Venza (AXUH80/85)
- 2022–present Harrier Plug-in Hybrid (AXUP80)
- 2020–present Sienna/Granvia (AXLH40/45)
- 2021–present Lexus NX 350h (AAZH20/25)
- 2021–present Lexus NX 400h+/450h+ (AAZH26)
- 2022–present Lexus RX 350h (AALH10/15)
- 2022–present Lexus RX 450h+ (AALH16)
- 2023–present Grand Highlander Hybrid (AASH10/15)
- 2023–present Lexus LM 350h (AAWH10)
- 2023–present Alphard Hybrid/Vellfire Hybrid (AAHH40/45)
- 2024–present Camry Hybrid (AXVH80/85)
- 2024–present Crown Signia (AZSH38)
- 2024–present Mazda CX-50 Hybrid (VA)

=== A25B-FXS ===
This engine is only used on hybrid models in China. Similar to the A25A-FXS engine used in other markets.

Applications (calendar years):

- 2018–present Lexus ES 300h (China) (AXZH10)
- 2022–present Lexus NX 350h (China) (AAZH20)
- 2022–present Lexus NX 400h+ (AAZH21)
- 2023–present Alphard Hybrid/Crown Vellfire Hybrid (China) (AAHH45)
- 2023–present Crown SportCross (China) (AZSH30)

=== A25C-FKS ===
Version used only in China which is largely identical to the A25A-FKS engine, manufactured by GTE (Guangqi Toyota Engine Co., Ltd.).

Applications (calendar years):

- 2018–present Camry (AXVA70; China only)
- 2020–present Wildlander (AXAA54)
- 2021–present Highlander (AXUA70; China only)

=== A25D-FXS ===
Localized A25 series engine for China, manufactured by GTE (Guangqi Toyota Engine Co., Ltd.).

Applications (calendar years):

- 2018–present Camry Hybrid (AXVH70; China only)
- 2021–present Wildlander Hybrid (AXAH54)
- 2021–present Wildlander Plug-in Hybrid (AXAP54)
- 2021–present Highlander Hybrid (AXUH78)
- 2021–present Sienna Hybrid (AXLH40)
- 2022–present Venza Hybrid (AXUH85)
- 2023–present Camry (AXVH80L)
- 2023–present Mazda CX-50 HEV

=== A25F-FXS ===
Localized A25 series engine for China, manufactured by FTCE (FAW Toyota Changchun Engine Co., Ltd.).

Applications (calendar years):

- 2021–present RAV4 Hybrid (AXAH52; China only)
- 2021–present RAV4 Plug-in Hybrid (AXAP52; China only)
- 2022–present Harrier Hybrid (AXUH80; China only)
- 2023–present Mazda CX-50 Plug-in Hybrid (China only)

=== A25G-FKS ===
Version used only in China which is largely identical to the A25A-FKS engine, manufactured by FTCE (FAW Toyota Changchun Engine Co., Ltd.).

Applications (calendar years):

- 2019–present Avalon (AXXA50; China only)
- 2019–present RAV4 (AXAA52; China only)
- 2021–present Crown Kluger (AXUA71)

=== A25H-FXS ===
Localized A25 series engine for China, manufactured by FTCE (FAW Toyota Changchun Engine Co., Ltd.).

Applications (calendar years):

- 2019–present Avalon Hybrid (AXXH50; China only)
- 2021–present Crown Kluger Hybrid (AXUH79)
- 2021–present Granvia Hybrid (AXLH40; China only)

== T24A ==
T24A
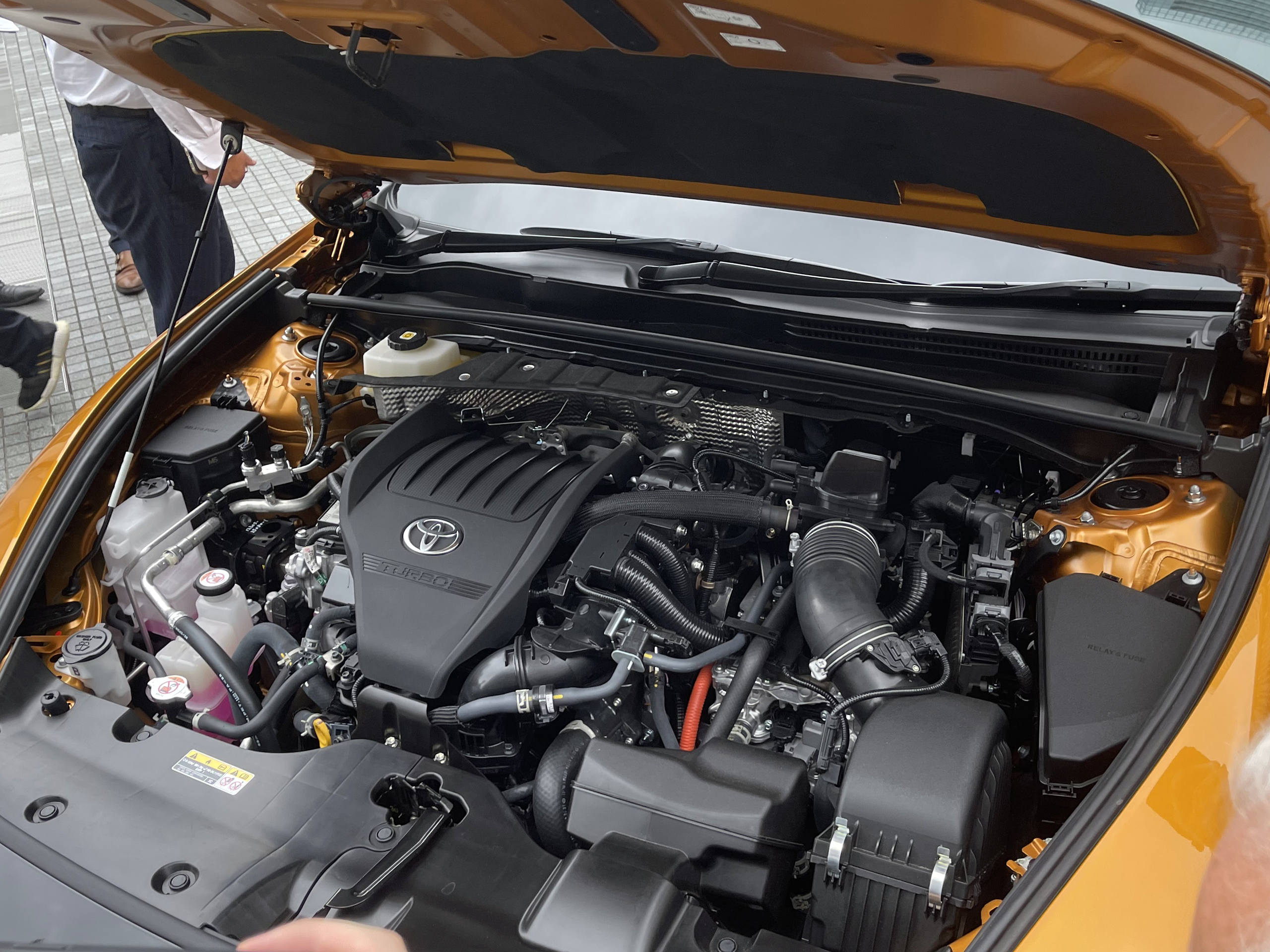
- T24A-FTS engine in the 2022 Crown Crossover

Overview
- Production: 2021–present

Layout
- Configuration: I4
- Displacement: 2,393 cc (146.0 cu in)
- Cylinder bore: 87.5 mm (3.445 in)
- Piston stroke: 99.5 mm (3.917 in)
- Compression ratio: 11.0:1

Combustion
- Turbocharger: Single twin-scroll
- Fuel system: D-4ST direct/port injection
- Fuel type: Petrol; Petrol hybrid

Output
- Power output: 170–207 kW (228–278 hp)
- Specific power: 71–86.5 kW (95–116 hp) per litre
- Torque output: 329–460 N⋅m (243–339 lb⋅ft)

Chronology
- Predecessor: 1GR-FE/2GR-FKS (V6); 2GR-FXS (V6 hybrid); 8AR-FTS (I4 turbo)

The T24A engine is a straight-four engine series that was first introduced in 2021 for the AZ20 series Lexus NX.

Model	Applications	Vehicle chassis code	Power	Torque	Calendar years
T24A-FTS	Crown Crossover Hybrid MAX/Dual Boost	TZSH35	200 kW (268 hp) at 6,000 rpm	460 N⋅m (339 lb⋅ft) at 2,000–3,000 rpm	2022–present
T24A-FTS	Highlander/Kluger	TXUA70; TXUA75	198 kW (265 hp) at 6,000 rpm	420 N⋅m (310 lb⋅ft) at 1,700–3,600 rpm	2022–present
T24A-FTS	Grand Highlander	TASA10; TASA15	198 kW (265 hp) at 6,000 rpm	420 N⋅m (310 lb⋅ft) at 1,700–3,600 rpm	2023–present
T24A-FTS	Grand Highlander Hybrid MAX	TASH15	202 kW (271 hp) at 6,000 rpm	460 N⋅m (339 lb⋅ft) at 2,000–3,000 rpm	2023–present
T24A-FTS	Tacoma	TZNA40; TZNA41; TZNA45; TZNA46	170–207 kW (228–278 hp)	329–430 N⋅m (243–317 lb⋅ft)	2023–present
T24A-FTS	Tacoma i-FORCE MAX	TZNH47	207 kW (278 hp)	381 N⋅m (281 lb⋅ft)	2024–present
T24A-FTS	Alphard/Vellfire	TAHA40; TAHA45	205 kW (275 hp) at 6,000 rpm	430 N⋅m (317 lb⋅ft) at 1,700–3,600 rpm	2023–present
T24A-FTS	Lexus NX 350	TAZA25	205 kW (275 hp) at 6,000 rpm	430 N⋅m (317 lb⋅ft) at 1,700–3,600 rpm	2021–present
T24A-FTS	Lexus RX 350	TALA10; TALA15	205 kW (275 hp) at 6,000 rpm	430 N⋅m (317 lb⋅ft) at 1,700–3,600 rpm	2022–present
T24A-FTS	Lexus TX 350	TAUA10; TAUA15	205 kW (275 hp) at 6,000 rpm	430 N⋅m (317 lb⋅ft) at 1,700–3,600 rpm	2022–present
T24A-FTS	Lexus RX 500h	TALH17	202 kW (271 hp) at 6,000 rpm	460 N⋅m (339 lb⋅ft) at 2,000–3,000 rpm	2022–present
T24A-FTS	Lexus TX 500h	TAUH15	202 kW (271 hp) at 6,000 rpm	460 N⋅m (339 lb⋅ft) at 2,000–3,000 rpm	2023–present
T24A-FTS	Lexus LM 500h	TAWH15	202 kW (271 hp) at 6,000 rpm	460 N⋅m (339 lb⋅ft) at 2,000–3,000 rpm	2023–present
T24A-FTS	Land Cruiser Prado	TJA250	206 kW (276 hp) at 6,000 rpm	430 N⋅m (317 lb⋅ft) at 4,300–4,500 rpm	2023–present
T24A-FTS	Land Cruiser Prado i-FORCE MAX	TJH250			2023–present

=== T24A-FTS ===
The "T" in the engine feature suffix "-FTS" designates the turbocharged version of this engine. Toyota have been using it to replace the naturally-aspirated 2GR-FKS V6, offering more peak torque at lower speeds and improved fuel consumption and emissions with the turbo engine.

There also are two distinct hybrid variants which carry the same T24A-FTS engine designation as the regular (non-hybrid) variant. For transverse engine applications (marketed as "Dual Boost Hybrid System" in Japan and "Hybrid MAX" in North America), the hybrid engine drives the front wheels and is equipped with two electric motors: one starter-generator and one traction assist; a third electric motor driving the rear axle is provided with all-wheel drive as a power-split hybrid variant. For longitudinal engine applications (marketed as "i-FORCE MAX" in North America), a single traction assist/generator motor is sandwiched between the engine and transmission, taking the place of a conventional automatic transmission torque converter.

The T24A-FTS used in body-on-frame truck and SUV applications share 54% of common parts with the variant used in passenger vehicles like the Highlander.

Applications (calendar years):

- 2021–present Lexus NX 350 (TAZA25)
- 2022–present Lexus RX 350 (TALA10/15)
- 2022–present Highlander/Kluger (TXUA70/75)
- 2023–present Grand Highlander (TASA10/15)
- 2023–present Tacoma (TZNA40/41/45/46)
- 2023–present Lexus TX 350 (TAUA10/15)
- 2023–present Alphard/Vellfire (TAHA40/45)
- 2024-present Land Cruiser Prado (TJA250)
- 2025–present 4Runner (TZNA50/55)

Hybrid MAX/Dual Boost transverse applications (calendar years):

- 2022–present Lexus RX 500h (TALH17)
- 2022–present Crown Crossover Hybrid MAX/Dual Boost (TZSH35)
- 2023–present Grand Highlander Hybrid MAX (TASH15)
- 2023–present Lexus LM 500h (TAWH15)
- 2023–present Lexus TX 500h (TAUH15)

i-FORCE MAX longitudinal hybrid applications (calendar years):

- 2023–present Tacoma i-FORCE MAX (TZNH47)
- 2024-present Land Cruiser Prado i-FORCE MAX (TJH250)
- 2025–present 4Runner i-FORCE MAX (TZNH55)

== V35A ==
V35A
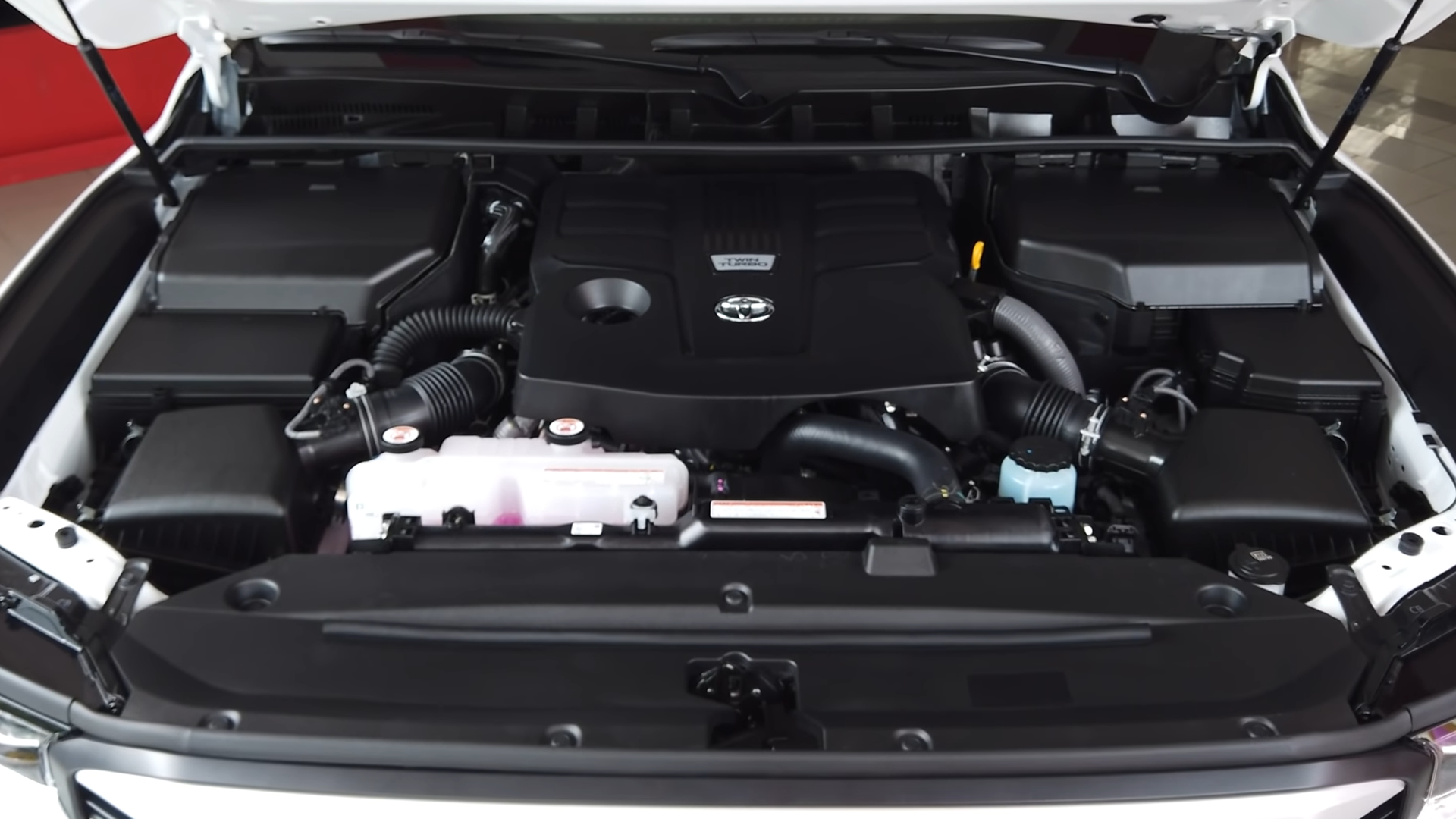
- V35A-FTS engine in the 2021 Land Cruiser

Overview
- Production: 2017–present

Layout
- Configuration: 60° V6
- Displacement: 3,445 cc (210.2 cu in)
- Cylinder bore: 85.5 mm (3.366 in)
- Piston stroke: 100.0 mm (3.937 in)
- Compression ratio: 10.5:1

Combustion
- Turbocharger: Twin-turbo
- Fuel system: D-4ST direct/port injection
- Fuel type: Petrol; Petrol hybrid

Output
- Power output: 260–310 kW (349–416 hp; 354–421 PS)
- Specific power: 75.5–90 kW (101–121 hp; 103–122 PS) per litre
- Torque output: 549–650 N⋅m (405–479 lb⋅ft)

Chronology
- Predecessor: 1UR-FE/1UR-FSE/3UR-FE (V8)

The V35A engine is a V6 engine series that was first introduced in 2017 for the XF50 series Lexus LS. Despite its "35" nomenclature and being advertised as a 3.5-litre engine, its actual displacement is 3.4 L (3,445 cc).

The V35A also serves as the powerplant for the Gen 3 LMP3 prototype racecars. This version of the engine has modified turbochargers and a dry sump oiling system, bringing about a power increase to 350 kW (470 hp).

Model	Applications	Vehicle chassis code	Power	Torque	Calendar years	Notes
V35A-FTS	Lexus LS 500	VXFA50; VXFA55	310 kW (416 hp; 421 PS) at 6,000 rpm	600 N⋅m (443 lb⋅ft) at 1,600–4,800 rpm	2017–present	
V35A-FTS	Land Cruiser	VJA300	305 kW (409 hp; 415 PS) at 5,200 rpm	650 N⋅m (479 lb⋅ft) at 2,000–3,600 rpm	2021–present	
V35A-FTS	Lexus LX 600	VJA310	305 kW (409 hp; 415 PS) at 5,200 rpm	650 N⋅m (479 lb⋅ft) at 2,000–3,600 rpm	2021–present	
V35A-FTS	Tundra	VXKA70; VXKA71; VXKA72; VXKA75; VXKA76; VXKA77	260–290 kW (349–389 hp; 354–394 PS) at 5,200 rpm	549 N⋅m (405 lb⋅ft) at 2,000 rpm 650 N⋅m (479 lb⋅ft) at 2,400 rpm	2021–present	
V35A-FTS	Tundra i-FORCE MAX	VXKH70; VXKH71; VXKH75; VXKH76	290 kW (389 hp; 394 PS) at 5,200 rpm	650 N⋅m (479 lb⋅ft) at 2,400 rpm	2021–present	
V35A-FTS	Sequoia	VXKH80; VXKH85	290 kW (389 hp; 394 PS) at 5,200 rpm	650 N⋅m (479 lb⋅ft) at 2,400 rpm	2022–present	The Sequoia uses the same hybrid powertrain as the Tundra i-FORCE MAX.
V35A-FTS	Lexus GX 550	VJA252	260 kW (349 hp; 354 PS) at 5,200 rpm	650 N⋅m (479 lb⋅ft) at 2,000–3,600 rpm	2023–present	The GX550 has physically smaller turbos versus the same engine in the Tundra/LX
V35A-FTS	Lexus LX 700h	VJH310	341 kW (457 hp; 464 PS) at 5,200 rpm	790 N⋅m (583 lb⋅ft) at 2,000–3,600 rpm	2025–present	

=== V35A-FTS ===
The twin-turbocharged version with 10.5:1 compression ratio. Pumping losses have been reduced by electrification of the waste gate of the twin turbo system. The engine achieves 37% thermal efficiency. A hybrid version (marketed as "i-FORCE MAX" in North America) is also available with the same engine designation as the regular variant.

The hybrid version was named Ward's World's 10 Best Engines list in 2022.

=== Recalls and Main Bearing Failures ===
Toyota made various changes to the V35A engine when preparing it for mass production and installation in higher volume truck and SUV models. Since its introduction in 2022, the revised V35A has been associated with multiple reliability issues, including premature main bearing wear, engine knocking, and sudden engine seizure. Toyota reported that certain engines were manufactured with machining debris left inside the crankcase, which could migrate to the #1 main bearing and cause accelerated wear or catastrophic failure.

Independent teardown investigations, including those by the Youtube channel I Do Cars, documented cases where even replacement engines installed under recall had exhibited bearing wear, metallic debris, and crankshaft scoring. These findings raised concerns that the issue may involve more than just manufacturing contamination, but potentially shortcomings related to the engine's lubrication system.

Between 2024 and 2026, Toyota issued several major recall campaigns for the V35A engine.

Recall 24V‑381 (2024): Approximately 102,000 Toyota Tundra pickups, and Lexus GX550 and LX600 luxury SUVs were recalled for engine replacement.

Recall 25V‑767 (2025): Expanded to 126,691 vehicles, adding 2024 model‑year units and introducing an inspection‑based remedy.

Recall 26V‑320 (2026): Added 43,566 additional vehicles built at Toyota’s Alabama plant.

In total, more than 270,000 vehicles have been recalled across multiple campaigns, with over 70,000 engines replaced by mid‑2026.

The V35A recalls are considered to be one of the largest modern engine‑related defects in Toyota’s history, drawing criticism due to this engine replacing Toyota's long‑running and highly reliable 4.6L and 5.7L V8 engines.

Applications (calendar years):

- 2017–present Lexus LS 500 (VXFA50/55)
- 2021–present Land Cruiser (VJA300)
- 2021–present Lexus LX 600 (VJA310)
- 2021–present Tundra (VXKA70/71/72/75/76/77)
- 2023–present Lexus GX 550 (VJA252)
- 2025–present Third-generation LMP3 spec.

i-FORCE MAX Hybrid applications (calendar years):

- 2021–present Tundra i-FORCE MAX (VXKH70/71/75/76)
- 2022–present Sequoia (VXKH80/85)
- 2025–present Lexus LX 700h (VJH310)
- 2025–present Land Cruiser (VJH300)

== See also ==
- Toyota F33A engine
- Toyota G16E engine
- List of Toyota engines
