= Toyota Grand Highlander =

Mid-size crossover SUV

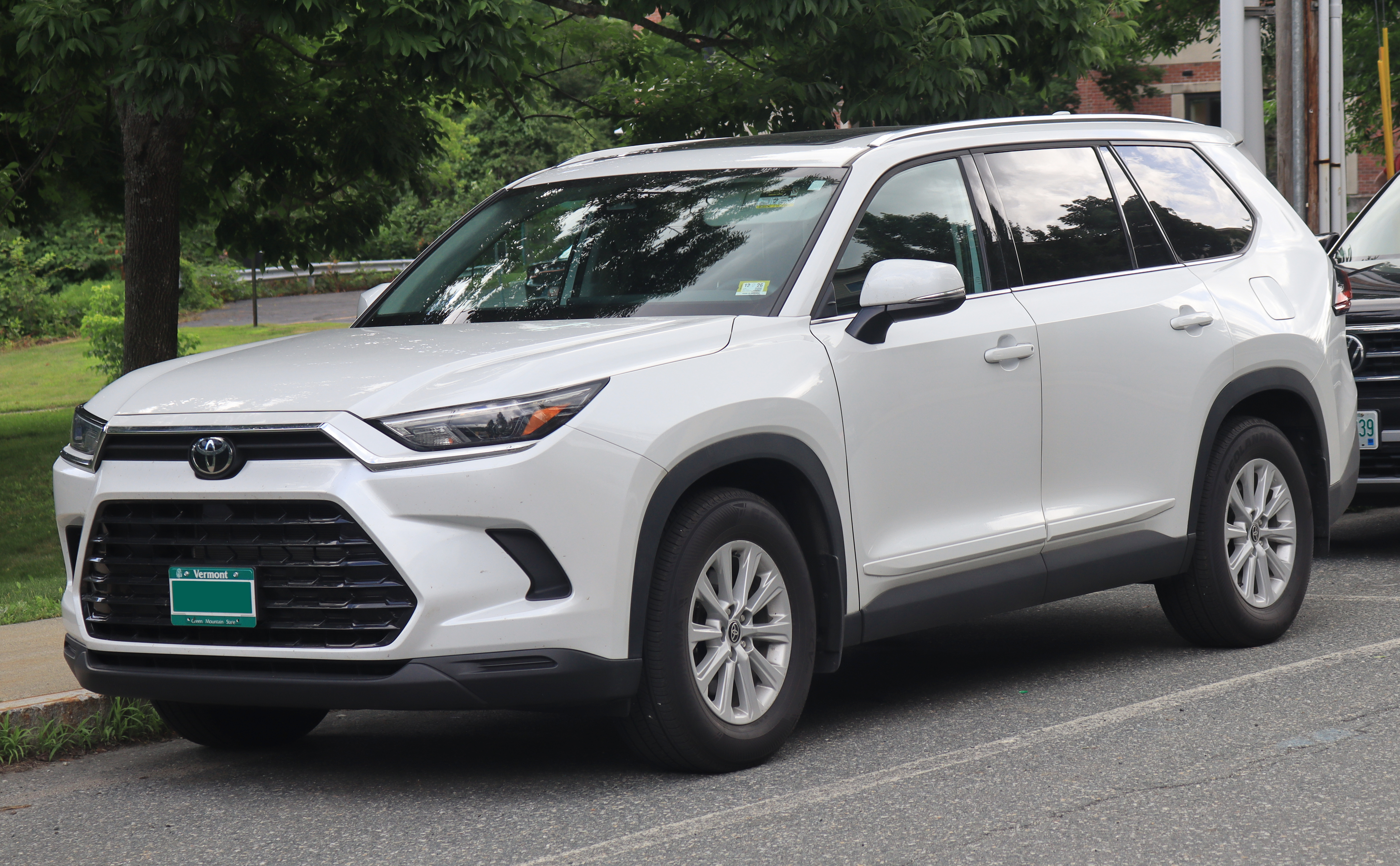
- 2026 Toyota Grand Highlander Hybrid XLE (US)

Overview
- Manufacturer: Toyota
- Model code: AS10
- Production: August 2023 – present
- Model years: 2024–present
- Assembly: United States: Princeton, Indiana (TMMI)

Body and chassis
- Class: Mid-size crossover SUV
- Body style: 5-door SUV
- Layout: Front-engine, front-wheel-drive; Front-engine, all-wheel-drive
- Platform: TNGA: GA-K
- Chassis: Unibody
- Related: Lexus TX; Toyota Century (G70); Toyota Highlander (XU70); Lexus RX (ALA10/ALH10); Toyota Crown (S235); Toyota Sienna (XL40)

Powertrain
- Engine: Gasoline: 2.4 L T24A-FTS turbo I4 (TASA10/15); Gasoline hybrid: 2.5 L A25A-FXS I4 (Hybrid, AASH10/15); 2.4 L T24A-FTS turbo I4 (Hybrid MAX, TASH15)
- Power output: 265 hp (198 kW; 269 PS) (Gas); 245 hp (183 kW; 248 PS) (Hybrid, combined); 362 hp (270 kW; 367 PS) (Hybrid MAX, combined)
- Transmission: 8-speed UA80F "Direct Shift" ECTi automatic (Gas); eCVT with sequential shift mode (Hybrid); 6-speed "Direct Shift-6AT" automatic + "eAxle" (Hybrid MAX)
- Hybrid drivetrain: Power-split (Hybrid); Parallel (Hybrid MAX)

Dimensions
- Wheelbase: 116.1 in (2,950 mm)
- Length: 201.4 in (5,116 mm)
- Width: 78.3 in (1,989 mm)
- Height: 70.1 in (1,781 mm)
- Curb weight: 4,300–4,920 lb (1,950–2,232 kg)

The Toyota Grand Highlander is a mid-size crossover SUV with three-row seating produced by Toyota since 2023. The Grand Highlander was introduced for the North American market on February 8, 2023. While sharing the nameplate and the GA-K platform with the regular Highlander, the Grand Highlander is longer, taller, and wider, and features entirely different exterior and interior styling.

In the North American market, the Grand Highlander is positioned between the smaller Highlander and the larger Tundra-based Sequoia. It is available in six grade levels: XLE, Limited, and Platinum since 2023, Nightshade from 2024 to 2026, LE starting in 2025 and Woodland starting in 2026. The Lexus equivalent is known as the Lexus TX, and is also exclusive to the North American market.

== Trim levels ==
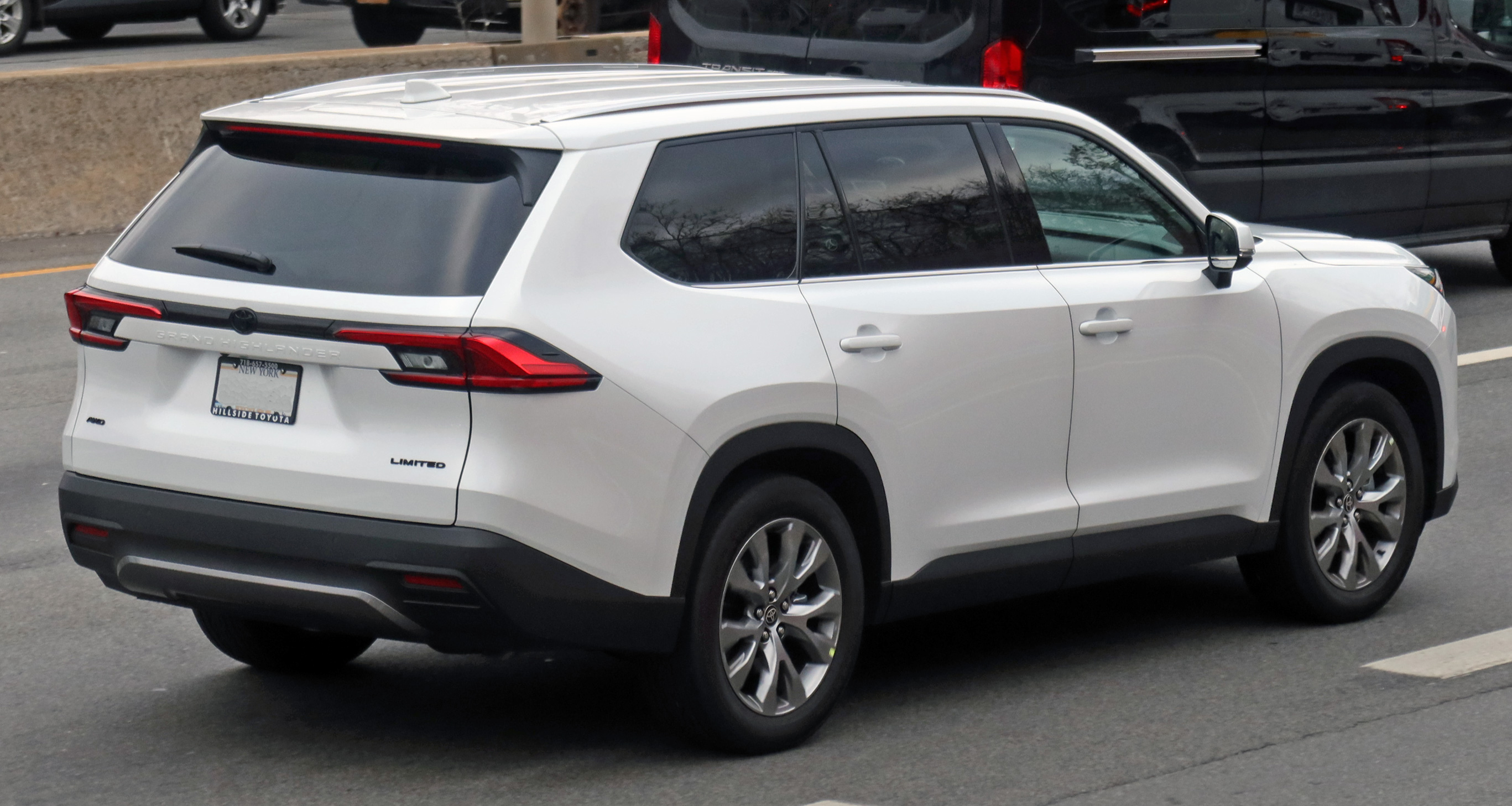
Rear view

Grand Highlander trim specifications
Engine (Trans) Trim	Gas (8sp. auto)	Hybrid (eCVT)	Hybrid MAX (6sp. auto)
LE	Yes	Yes	No
XLE	Yes	Yes	No
Limited	Yes	Yes	Yes
Nightshade	No	Yes	No
Woodland	No	Yes	No
Platinum	Yes	No	Yes

== Powertrain ==
The Grand Highlander exclusively uses four-cylinder powertrains. The gas models use the turbocharged 2.4-liter T24A-FTS engine producing up to 265 hp (198 kW; 269 PS) and 310 lb⋅ft (420 N⋅m) of torque. The 2.5-liter hybrid powertrain from the regular Highlander, using the naturally-aspirated 2.5-liter A25A-FXS engine, is available on LE, XLE, and Limited and standard on Nightshade (from 2024 to 2026) and Woodland; it is advertised for a maximum of 245 hp (183 kW; 248 PS) combined. Also available is a turbocharged hybrid powertrain from the Crown Crossover, marketed as "Hybrid MAX," which pairs electric motors with the T24A-FTS. Hybrid MAX is available on Limited (from 2023 to 2026) and Platinum.

The gas and Hybrid MAX models have a 5,000 lb (2,268 kg) towing capacity, while the Hybrid models are rated to tow 3,500 lb (1,588 kg).

Grand Highlander powertrains
Model Spec		Gas T24A-FTS		Hybrid A25A-FXS		Hybrid MAX T24A-FTS	
Model Spec		Power	Torque	Power	Torque	Power	Torque
Output	Combined, net	265 hp (269 PS)	310 lb⋅ft (420 N⋅m)	245 hp (248 PS)	177 lb⋅ft (240 N⋅m)	362 hp (367 PS)	400 lb⋅ft (540 N⋅m)
Output	Gasoline engine	265 hp (269 PS) at 6000	310 lb⋅ft (420 N⋅m) at 1700-3600	186 hp (189 PS) at 6000	175 lb⋅ft (237 N⋅m) at 3600–5200	271 hp (275 PS) at 6000	339 lb⋅ft (460 N⋅m) at 2000–3000
Output	Electric motor, front	—	—	88 kW (120 PS)	149 lb⋅ft (202 N⋅m)	61 kW (83 PS)	215.4 lb⋅ft (292.0 N⋅m)
Output	Electric motor, rear	—	—	40 kW (54 PS)	89 lb⋅ft (121 N⋅m)	58.6 kW (79.7 PS)	124 lb⋅ft (168 N⋅m)

== Safety ==
The 2024 model year Grand Highlander was not awarded by the IIHS, as it did not receive a Good rating in the driver-side small overlap front crash test to be qualified for a safety award.

IIHS scores (2024)
Small overlap front	Acceptable
Moderate overlap front (original test)	Good
Side (updated test)	Good
Headlights (varies by trim/option)	Acceptable
Front crash prevention: vehicle-to-pedestrian	Good
Child seat anchors (LATCH) ease of use	Good

== Yearly changes ==
=== 2025 ===
In 2024, for the 2025 model year, two new trims were introduced: a low-cost LE trim slotting below the XLE trim, and a Hybrid Nightshade trim with the same feature profile as the Limited trim, blacked-out elements such as 20-inch alloy rims and mirror caps, and the 2.5-liter hybrid powertrain featured on the Hybrid XLE and Limited trims.

As standard equipment, the LE trim receives features such as 8-passenger seating with 2nd-row bench seats, a power liftgate, a 12.3-inch touchscreen infotainment system, and heated outer mirrors with blind spot monitors. It is available with either the 2.4-liter turbocharged engine or the 2.5-liter hybrid powertrain.

=== 2026 ===
In 2025, for the 2026 model year, the Grand Highlander remained unchanged.

=== 2027 ===
In 2026, for the 2027 model year, the new Woodland trim introduced. The Woodland trim features 18-inch black alloy wheels with all-terrain tires, additional 0.5 inch ground clearance, removal console/cooler for the second row seats, weather floor mats with Woodland logo, and black badges, roof rails, mirror caps, shark fin antenna, and accent trim around the headlights and windows. The Hybrid MAX Platinum received changes to black finish for the grille, hood, roof rails, window trim, mirror caps and shark fin antenna for the exterior. The gas-powered Platinum received a new wheel design for 2027 model year. The Hybrid MAX Limited and Hybrid Nightshade trims were discontinued for the 2027 model year.

== Sales ==
Year	United States		Canada
Year	Overall	Hybrid	Canada
2023	48,036	11,986	4,383
2024	71,721	26,119	
2025	136,801	69,210	

== See also ==
- List of Toyota vehicles
