= Lotus-Radford Type 62-2 =

Sports car by Radford and Lotus

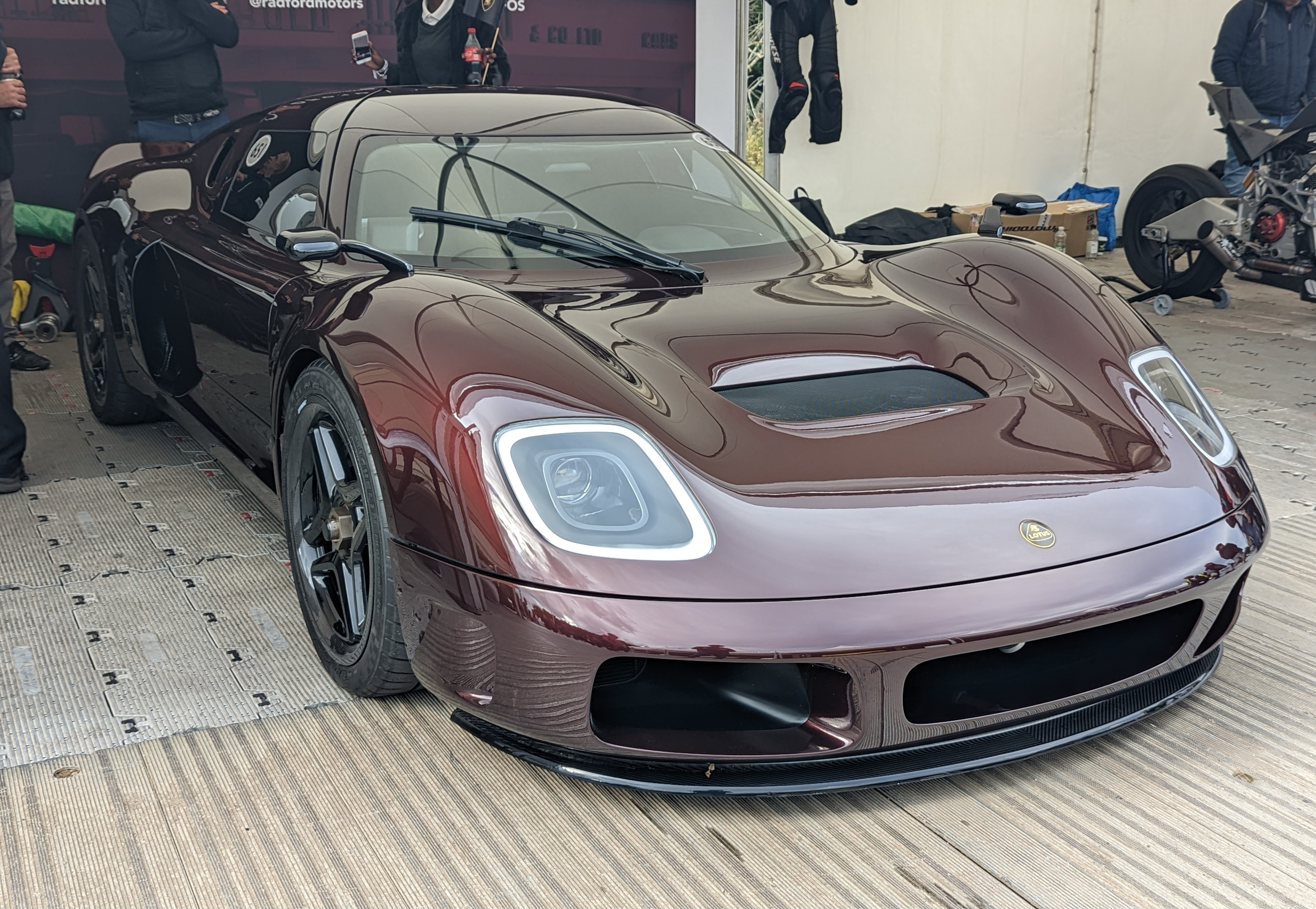

Overview
- Manufacturer: Lotus Cars, Radford Motors
- Also called: Radford Type 62-2
- Production: 2022–present
- Designer: Jenson Button; Mark Stubbs

Body and chassis
- Class: Sports car (S)
- Body style: 2-door coupé
- Layout: Rear mid-engine, rear-wheel-drive
- Platform: Lotus Exige
- Related: Lotus 62

Powertrain
- Engine: 3.5 L (213.6 cu in) Toyota 2GR-FE supercharged V6

Dimensions
- Height: 1,133 mm (44.6 in)
- Kerb weight: 1,000 kg (2,205 lb) (dry)

The Lotus-Radford Type 62-2 or simply Radford Type 62-2, is a sports car produced by British coachbuilding firm Radford in partnership with Lotus Cars. Built as a homage to the original Lotus 62, production will be limited to 62 units. The car is available in three trim levels: "Classic", "Gold Leaf", and "John Player Special". Of the 62 planned units, twelve will be in the John Player Special trim, and another twelve will be in the Gold Leaf trim. Based on the Lotus Exige, the Type 62-2 shares the chassis and engine, the former of which also has a new rear subframe.

== Background ==
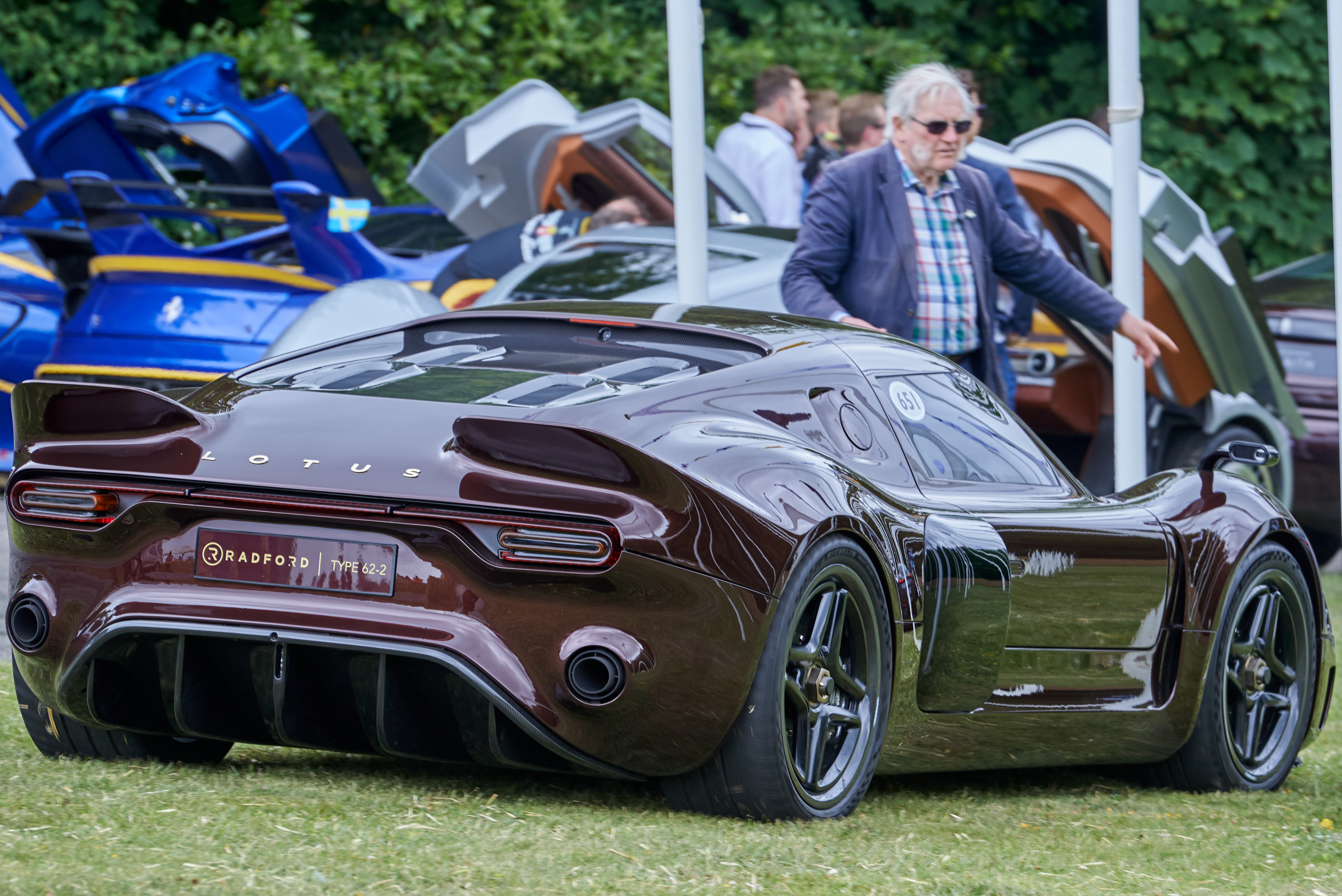
At Goodwood Festival of Speed in 2022

Jenson Button, former Formula One driver, alongside designer Mark Stubbs, Ant Anstead and lawyer Roger Behle revived the defunct Radford marque in 2021, with the Type 62-2 being the company's first wholly in-house design. Radford also purchased the rights to use the John Player Special livery used on several Lotus Formula One cars in the 1970s.

== Overview ==
=== Exterior and interior ===
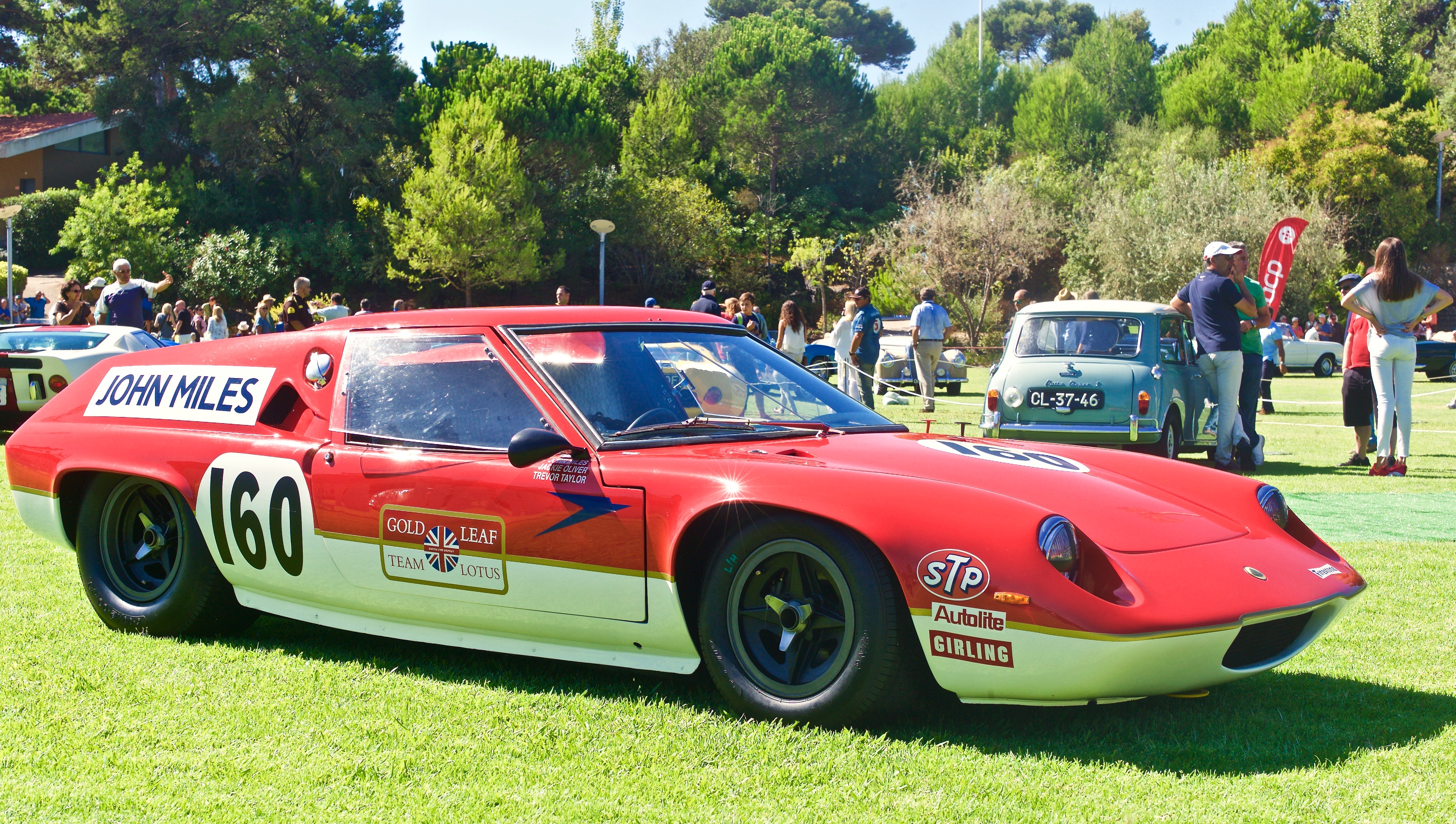
The original Lotus 62, with the Gold Leaf (a product of Imperial Tobacco) livery

With the three trim levels come two different liveries: the Gold Leaf wears the same livery that appeared on the original Lotus 62, and the John Player Special trim is a tribute to the eponymous Formula One livery that the Lotus Formula One team bore in the 1970s. The Classic is the most aerodynamically basic trim, the Gold Leaf trim receives two small wickerbills at the rear of the car, and the John Player Special is the most aerodynamically advanced trim, with a larger front splitter and rear diffuser, combined with larger side intakes to help cool the engine. Radford, being a coachbuilding company, has also given customers the option of fitting features such as a wickerbill on trims that would not otherwise have them. Radford also offers a "Quali Edition" package on top of the Gold Leaf trim, which offers more aggressive aerodynamic features such as a larger front splitter and rear diffuser, carbon ceramic brakes, and carbon composite wheels. The Lotus badge on the front is also gold set against enamel. Significant use of carbon composites in the body panels alongside lightweight bonded and riveted aluminium bring the dry weight of the 62-2 to just under 1,000 kg (2,205 lb).

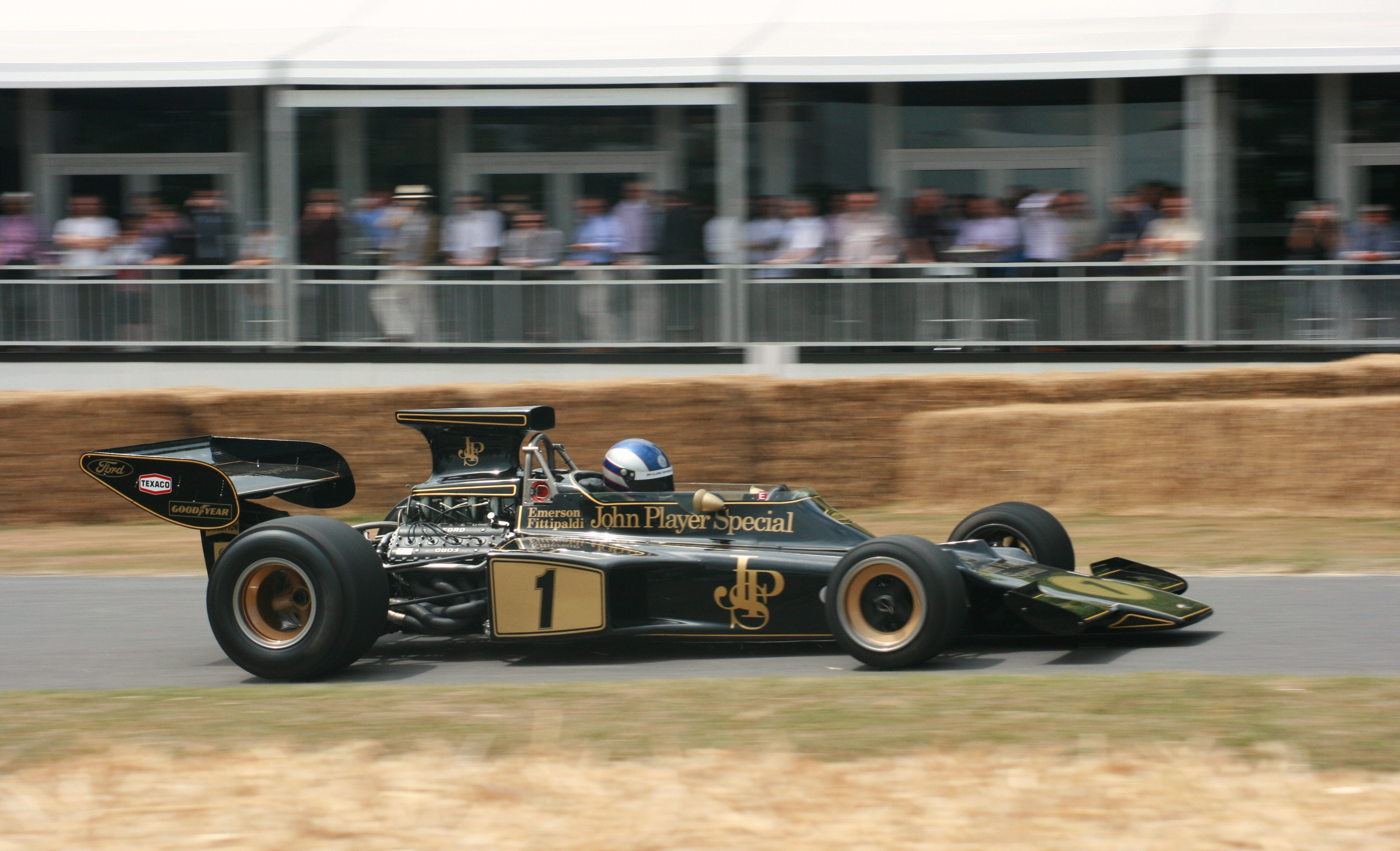
The Lotus 72E of Emerson Fittipaldi wearing the John Player Special livery

The interior of the Type 62-2 is largely analogue; the dashboard carries a stopwatch and an analog clock, in partnership with British watchmaker Bremont, and various toggle switches.The steering wheel is devoid of any buttons. Digital connectivity is still provided by a build plaque (which contains the vehicle identifier unique to every chassis), which doubles as a magnetic phone holder/wireless charger, along with Wi-Fi and Bluetooth capabilities. Although the Type 62-2 was designed for trackability, there is still room for luggage behind the engine bay, albeit not much.

=== Powertrain ===
The 62-2 borrows the Toyota 2GR-FE from the Exige, producing 436 PS (430 hp; 321 kW) in the Classic trim and 507 PS (500 hp; 373 kW) in the Gold Leaf trim via an ECU remap. The John Player Special and Gold Leaf trims receive upgraded camshafts, pistons, and connecting rods, with the former also receiving a larger supercharger. The enlarged supercharger gives the John Player Special trim an output of 608 PS (600 hp; 447 kW).

The Classic is the sole trim level available with a six-speed manual transmission, the Gold Leaf and John Player Special trims both come with a seven-speed dual-clutch transmission and a limited-slip differential. However, Radford still offers customisability and the option for Classic trim owners to upgrade to the dual-clutch transmission and more powerful Gold Leaf engine. Traction control and an anti-lock braking system are available with the dual-clutch transmission and can be turned off at the driver's discretion.

=== Suspension and wheels ===
Coilover springs provide the Type 62-2's ride height control, with all four dampers being individually adjustable, along with a nose lift option to negotiate raised surfaces such as speed bumps. The Classic trim comes with 17-inch wheels at the front and 18-inch wheels at the rear, with the Gold Leaf and John Player Special trims receiving 18-inch front and 19-inch rear wheels by Dymag. The John Player Special also has the option of carbon fibre wheels like the Quali Edition package for the Gold Leaf, along with Michelin Pilot Sport Cup 2 tyres. It also receives AP calipers and 360 mm (14.2 in) carbon ceramic rotors. The Gold Leaf and Classic trims come with 4-piston AP calipers and iron rotors.
