= Toyota FJ Cruiser =

Retro-styled mid-size SUV

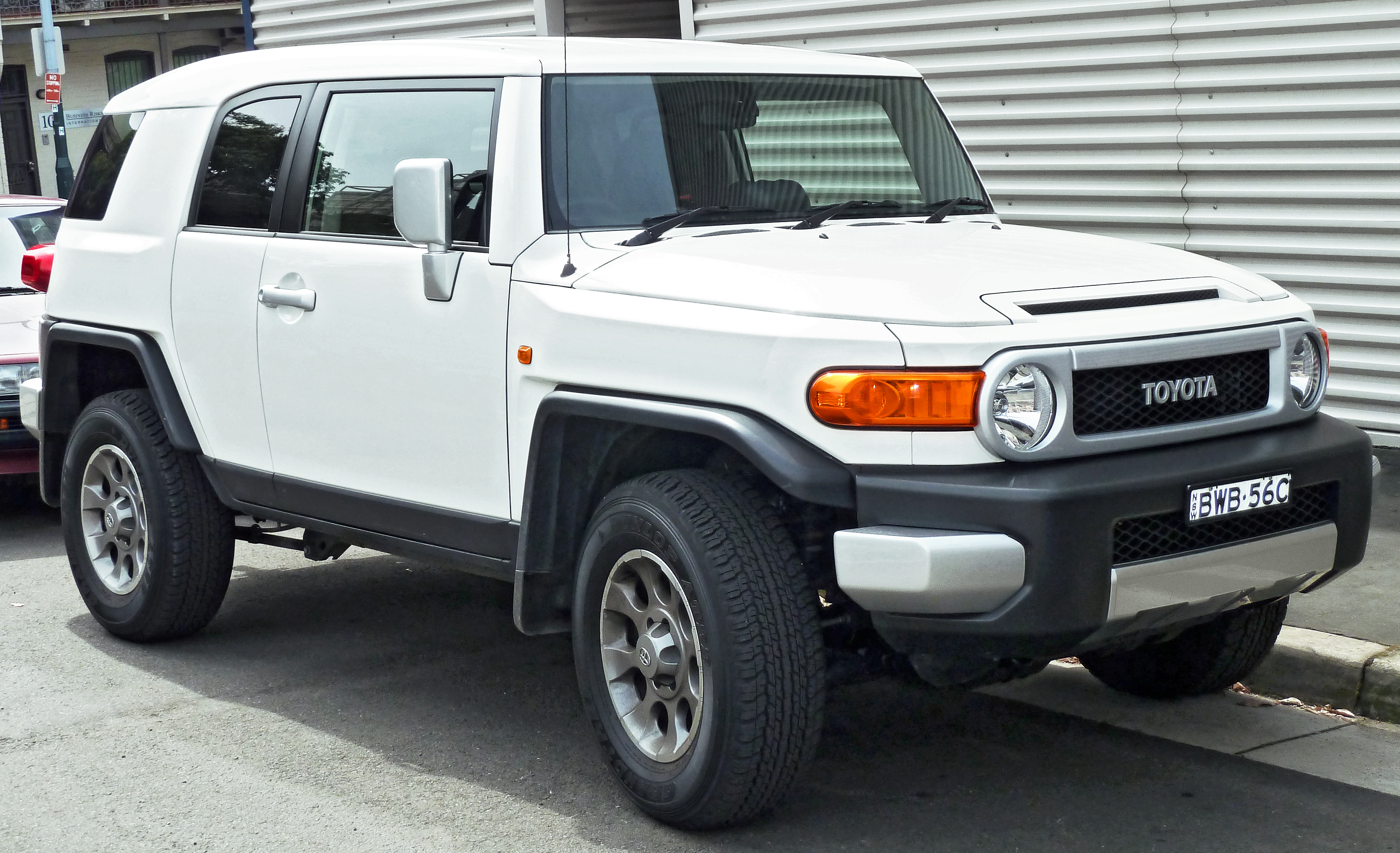

Overview
- Manufacturer: Toyota
- Model code: XJ10
- Production: January 2006 – December 2022
- Model years: 2007–2014 (North America)
- Assembly: Japan: Hamura, Tokyo (Hino)
- Designer: Jin Won Kim (exterior); Bill Chergosky (interior)

Body and chassis
- Class: Mid-size SUV
- Body style: 5-door SUV with rear suicide doors
- Layout: Front-engine, four-wheel-drive (GSJ15); Front-engine, rear-wheel-drive (GSJ10)
- Platform: Toyota F2
- Chassis: Body-on-frame
- Related: Toyota 4Runner; Toyota Land Cruiser Prado/Lexus GX

Powertrain
- Engine: Petrol: 4.0 L 1GR-FE V6
- Transmission: 6-speed manual (4WD only); 5-speed automatic

Dimensions
- Wheelbase: 2,690 mm (105.9 in)
- Length: 4,670 mm (183.9 in)
- Width: 1,895–1,905 mm (74.6–75.0 in)
- Height: 1,830 mm (72.0 in) (4WD); 1,810 mm (71.3 in) (2WD)
- Curb weight: 1,837–2,015 kg (4,050–4,442 lb)

Chronology
- Predecessor: Toyota Hilux Surf (Japan)

The Toyota FJ Cruiser (Japanese: トヨタ・FJクルーザー, Hepburn: Toyota Efujē Kurūzā) is a retro-styled mid-size SUV produced by Toyota between 2006 and 2022. Introduced as a concept car at the January 2003 North American International Auto Show, the FJ Cruiser was approved for production after positive consumer response and debuted at the February 2005 Chicago Auto Show in final production form.

The FJ Cruiser was built by Toyota subsidiary Hino Motors in Hamura, Japan, between 2006 and 2022. The vehicle shares many structural underpinnings with the Toyota Land Cruiser Prado. The FJ Cruiser entered the Japanese market on 4 December 2010, announced on 25 November in that year.

On 5 November 2013, Toyota USA announced the 2014 model year Trail Teams edition would be called the "Ultimate Edition" and that the 2014 model year would be the last for the FJ Cruiser in that market. It continued to be made for sale in other markets such as Australia until its export to that market was discontinued in August 2016. As of April 2022, it was still sold in markets such as Chile, the Middle East, the Philippines and Southern African Customs Union countries.

On 1 October 2022, Toyota announced that the FJ Cruiser would be discontinued in the Middle East by December 2022, along with a final edition model.

== Design and development ==
By the time the production of the original FJ40 ended in 1984, Toyota had shifted towards increasing the size and luxury of the Land Cruiser line. The idea of a new FJ with rugged capabilities of the FJ40 originated in the mid-1990s with Toyota's product planner Dave Danzer and vice-president of sales and operations Yoshi Inaba.

Danzer worked secretly with Akio Toyoda to set up a special shop at the NUMMI plant to test the feasibility of a new FJ40 by combining Tacoma underpinnings with the bodies of Toyota Bandeirantes, an FJ40-based vehicle, which was still in production in Brazil (as a diesel model only) at the time; the Bandeirante was discontinued in 2001. Toyoda returned to Japan to join the board of directors giving a high level support to the project. Toyota's flagship design studio, Calty, was then brought in to deliver a fresh interpretation of the FJ40.

Offroad vehicle was known internally as Rugged Youth Utility (RYU) aimed at attracting young male buyers, a segment Toyota felt they were losing touch with at the time. Many takes on the RYU concept were created including the 2001 Rugged Sports Coupe concept before a retro style design created by 24-year-old designer Jin Won Kim was chosen as the final exterior concept, with William Chergosky designing the interior.

The FJ Cruiser concept debuted at the 2003 Detroit Auto Show in Voodoo Blue, which would become the signature color for the production FJ Cruiser. The bold styling was an immediate hit with the automotive press and general public despite competing with more exotic concepts like the Cadillac Sixteen and Dodge Tomahawk. By resurrecting design traits from the iconic FJ40, the FJ Cruiser was viewed as a new halo car for Toyota, much like the similarly retro-styled 2005 Mustang had been for Ford.

In mid-2004, Toyota began extensive off-road evaluations of the FJ platform by driving development mules on many of the most difficult trails in North America, including Moab, Utah, the Angeles National Forest, the Mojave Desert, and the Rubicon Trail. Despite each one-off mule costing hundreds of thousands of dollars, the development team was determined to push the capabilities of the prototypes in order to deliver reliable offroad performance in the production model. Changes to the A-TRAC traction control system and suspension tuning came as a direct result of the prototype testing.

The exterior of the FJ concept remained largely unchanged when the final production model debuted at the 2005 Chicago Auto Show. However, chief production engineer Akio Nishimura had to significantly alter the amenities offered in Chergosky's interior concept to keep the price of the production FJ Cruiser reasonable. Unique interior touches like the gear shifter that doubled as a shovel handle, removable interior lights which doubled as flashlights, and flat-folding front seats were removed, though several concept items remained as factory options.

=== Exterior ===
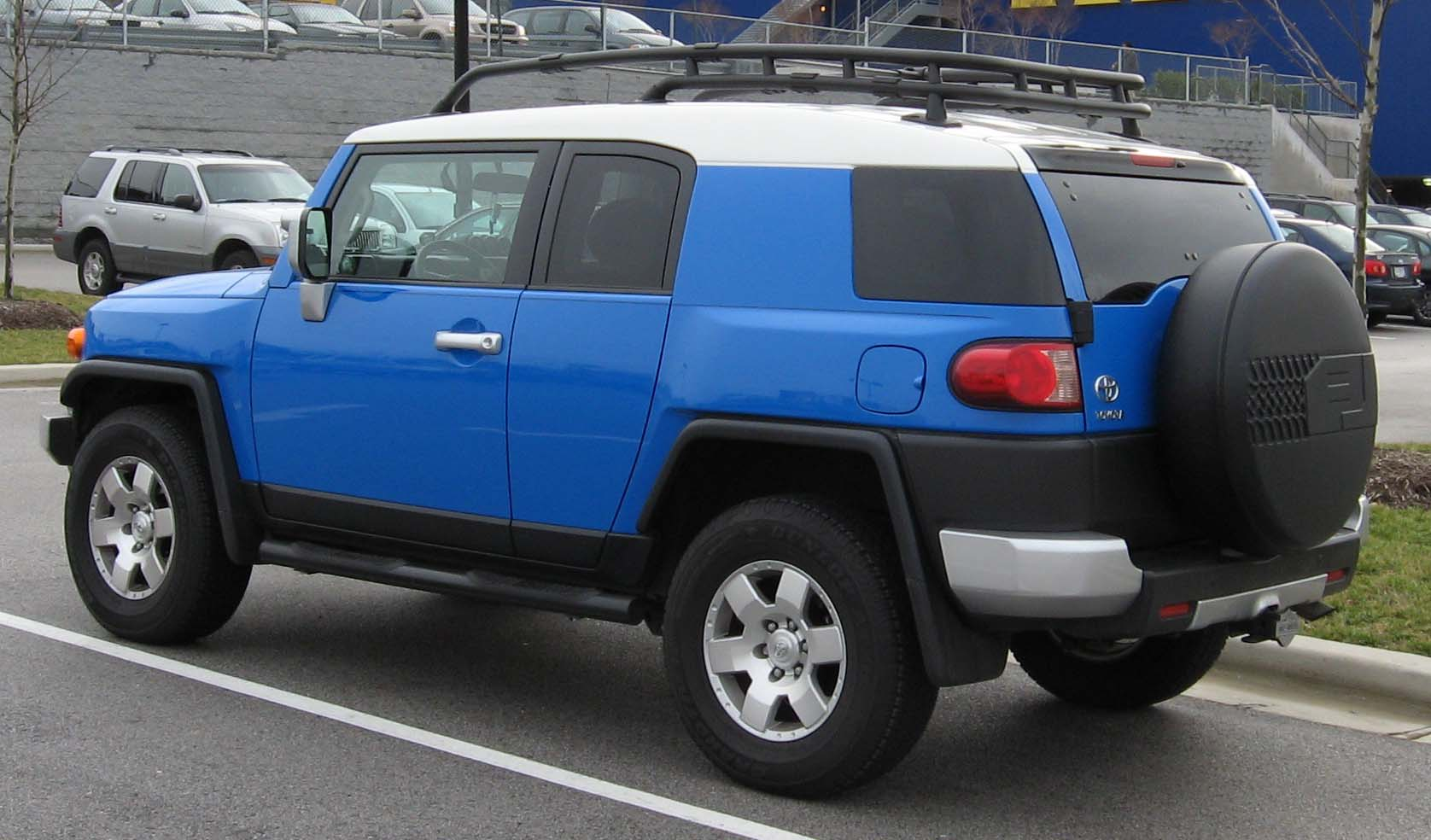
2007–2010 Toyota FJ Cruiser (LHD, US)

The FJ Cruiser features a short wheelbase, stocky frame, and grille-headlight arrangement much like the original FJ40. Other throwback design cues include a nearly vertical windshield with three windshield wipers for maximum surface area coverage. The FJ Cruiser also featured the name "Toyota" spelled out across the grille instead of the corporate emblem which has been in use since 1990, another reference to the FJ40 and other older Toyota trucks. The FJ's body features rear-opening access doors that give a unique look to the SUV. Special high-strength steel was used to give the vehicle side impact protection without the need for a door pillar.

=== Interior ===
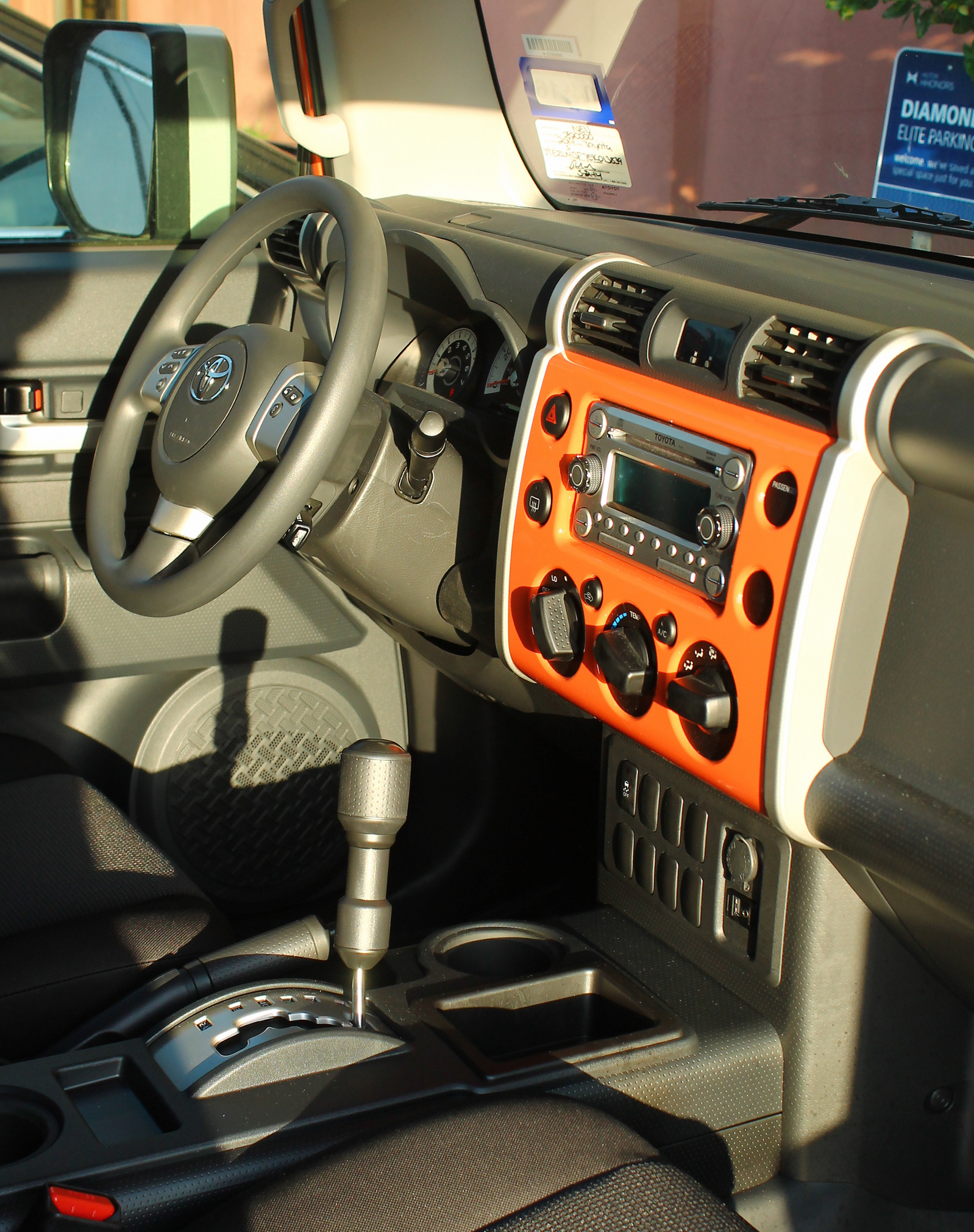
FJ Cruiser interior

The interior of the FJ features many design elements focused on enhancing off-road practicality. All interior surfaces are covered with washable rubber materials to aid in fast cleanup after heavy outdoor use. The FJ also incorporates oversized controls to aid drivers with gloved hands. The three-gauge cluster (with compass, temperature, and inclinometer) as well as the 120 V rear outlet were carried over from the FJ Cruiser concept vehicle as options on the final production model.

== Specifications ==
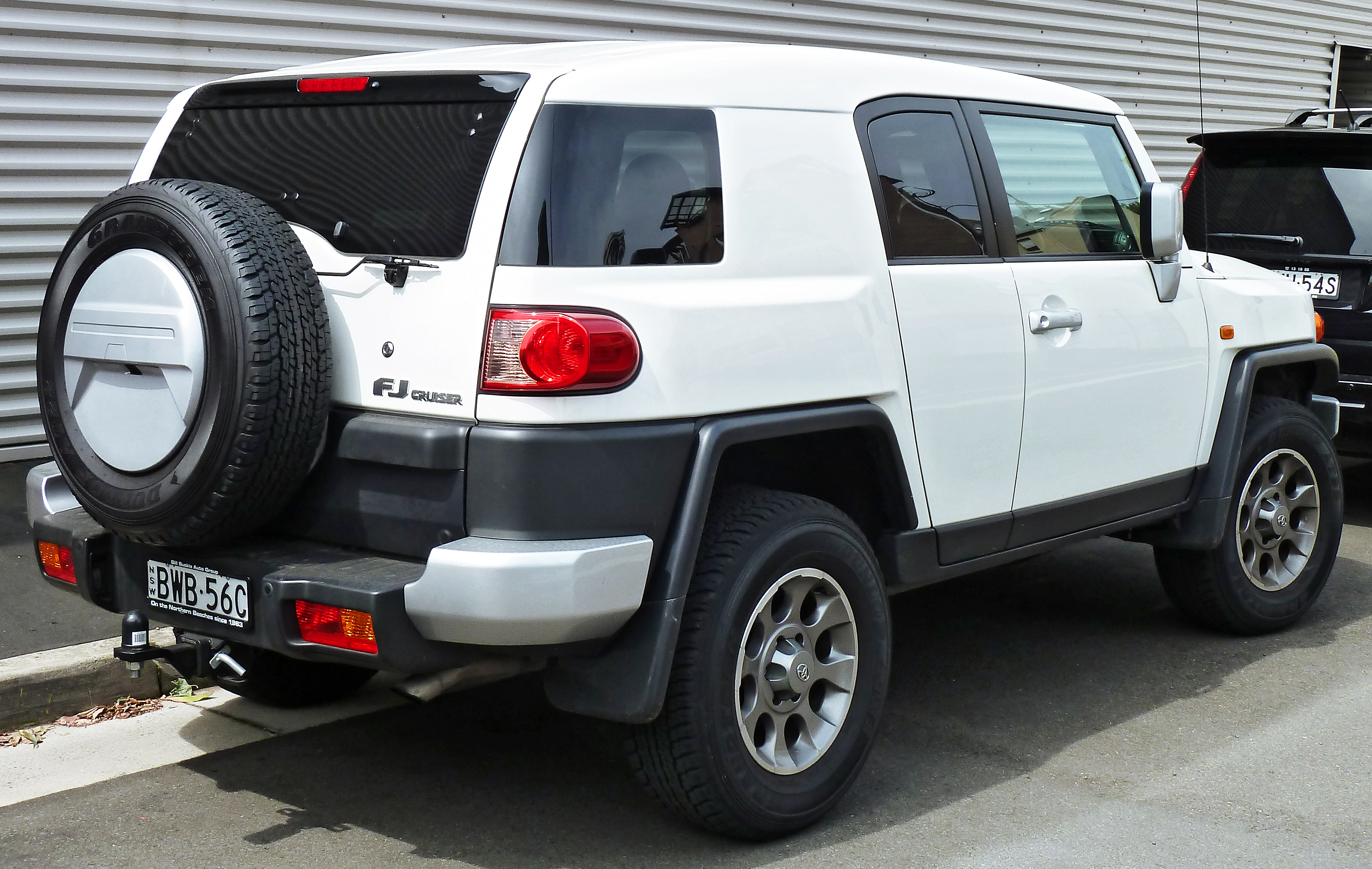
2011 FJ Cruiser right-hand drive variant with license plate located on the rear bumper (Australia)

At 183.9 inches (4.67 m) in length, the FJ Cruiser is a mid-size SUV offered by Toyota in North America, slotting between the smaller RAV4 and larger Highlander. Toyota sources many components from other vehicles to produce the FJ including shared engines and transmissions found in the Tacoma, Tundra and 4Runner as well as suspension components used in the Prado, Hilux, Tacoma, and 4Runner.

The 4x4 FJ Cruiser has 9.6 inches (24 cm) of ground clearance, 34° approach and 30° departure angles, and a 27.4° breakover angle, with 8 inches (20 cm) of front and 9 inches (23 cm) of rear suspension travel. The FJ is also designed to drive through up to 27.5 inches (70 cm) deep of water and has a 5,000 lb (2,268 kg) towing capacity for both 4x4 and 4x2 variants. On road, the FJ accelerates to 60 mph (97 km/h) in 7.8 seconds and has 0.69 G of lateral grip tested with stock Bridgestone Dueler tires.

=== Chassis ===
Structurally, the FJ Cruiser incorporates a body on frame truck style design similar, but not identical to that of the two-door Prado platform. The FJ Cruiser uses a high-mounted, double wishbone front suspension and stabilizer bar, and a 4-link rear suspension with lateral rod with coil springs and stabilizer bar. The 120-series Land Cruiser Prado, Tacoma, 4Runner, and Hilux share the same suspension parts as the FJ Cruiser. The FJ Cruiser uses power-assisted four-piston front and two-piston rear ventilated disc brakes with an anti-lock braking system (ABS), electronic brakeforce distribution (EBD), brake assist (BA) and is also equipped with vehicle stability control (VSC) and a specialized traction control system known as "A-TRAC". The A-TRAC system applies braking to control wheels that have lost traction, mimicking the performance of a locking differential without the "binding" that can make steering difficult in normal locking differential setups.

Toyota made revisions to the engine bay's inner fender aprons due to some bulging and cracking issues with the 2007 and some early 2008 models. The bulges and cracks in the inner fenders were attributed to a Toyota design flaw through certain vehicle identification numbers. Toyota addressed the problem and has changed the design.

=== Powertrain ===
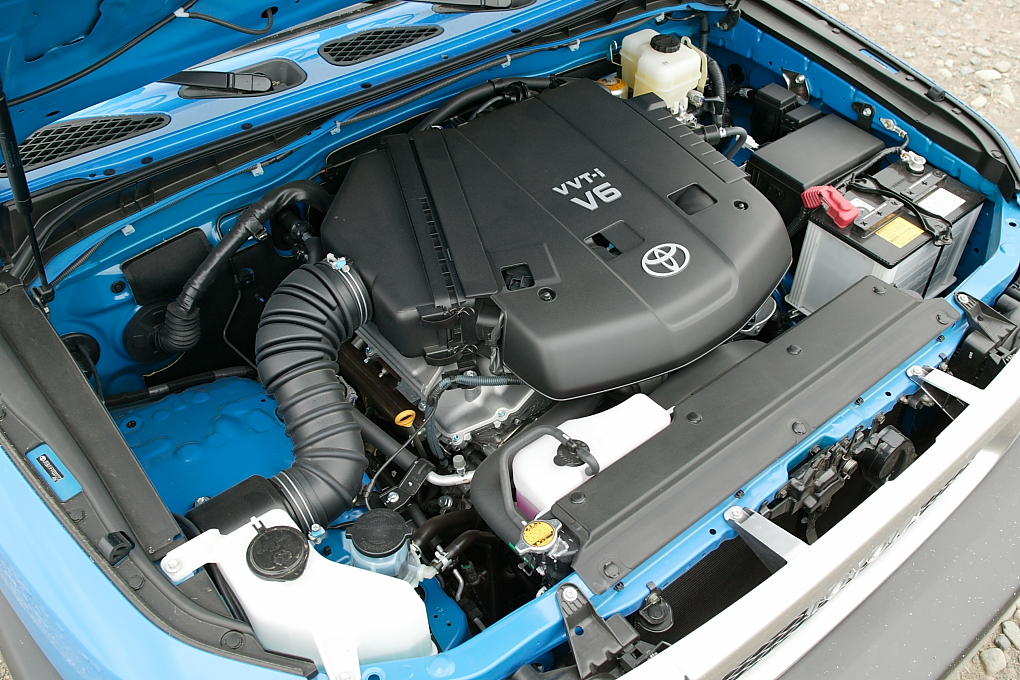
"1GR-FE" 4.0L V6 engine in the FJ Cruiser

The FJ Cruiser uses the 4.0-liter 1GR-FE DOHC V6. For the 2007 to 2009 model years, the engine came with single variable valve timing (VVT-i) which produces 239 hp (178 kW) at 5,200 rpm, and 278 lb⋅ft (377 N⋅m) of torque at 3,700 rpm on 91 octane fuel. For the 2010 model year, the FJ Cruiser's engine gained Dual VVT-i technology which adjusts timing on both intake and exhaust camshafts resulting in 259 hp (193 kW) at 5,600 rpm, and 270 lb⋅ft (366 N⋅m) on 87 octane, in addition to slightly improved fuel economy on 91 octane fuel. For model year 2011, these figures rose to 260 hp (194 kW) at 5600 rpm, and 271 lb⋅ft (367 N⋅m). The 2011 onwards engine meets stringent LEV II/Tier 2 Bin 5 emissions certification. Both versions of the 1GR-FE engine run normally on 87 octane fuel though they produce less power thus Toyota recommends premium fuel for demanding situations such as towing, off-roading, and driving at high elevation.

Four-wheel drive models equipped with the RA61F manual transmission have a full-time 4WD system; it employs a center TORSEN differential, with a locking feature and distributes the engine's torque 40∶60 under most driving conditions. The TORSEN unit varies torque distribution as needed, based on steering angle and wheel slippage.

Rear-wheel drive models were available in some markets, only with automatic transmissions, and came standard with a limited-slip rear differential.

- Five-speed A750E automatic transmission on rear-wheel drive models
- Five-speed A750F automatic transmission with VF2A transfer case on part-time 4x4 models
- Six-speed RA61F manual transmission with VF4B transfer case on full-time 4x4 models

=== Safety ===
Side curtain airbags for both rows and side torso airbags optional on 2007 models became standard on 2008 models. The Insurance Institute for Highway Safety (IIHS) awarded the FJ Cruiser its Top Safety Pick accolade. The FJ Cruiser received a "good" overall rating in both the front and side impacts tests and also received the "good" rating in all 14 measured categories.

NHTSA crash test ratings (2008) and 2014
Frontal driver:	5/5 stars
Frontal passenger:	4/5 stars
Side driver:	5/5 stars
Side rear passenger:	5/5 stars
Rollover:	26.7%

2014 Toyota FJ Cruiser on IIHS:
Category	Rating
Moderate overlap frontal offset	Good
Small overlap frontal offset (2009–present)	Not tested
Side impact	Good
Roof strength	Good (Note: strength-to-weight ratio: 3.47)

== Markets ==
The FJ Cruiser was primarily developed for the North American market but has been sold in small numbers globally since its launch. On 25 November 2010, Toyota announced sales would begin in right-hand drive form for the Japanese market. Sales began on 4 December, replacing the outgoing Hilux Surf and selling alongside the Land Cruiser. Japanese-produced right-hand drive models have a different rear bumper to North American models with the license plate located on the bumper as opposed to under the tailgate door handle. In addition, right-hand drive versions have the side indicator markers located on the fender panels, rather than located on the side-view mirrors used for left-hand drive production FJ Cruisers. Sales of right-hand drive model began in Australia and New Zealand in 2011 available in only four-wheel drive with automatic transmission and a petrol engine.

Japanese market sales, never substantial to begin with, were halted in January 2018.

== Special editions ==
=== TRD Special Edition ===
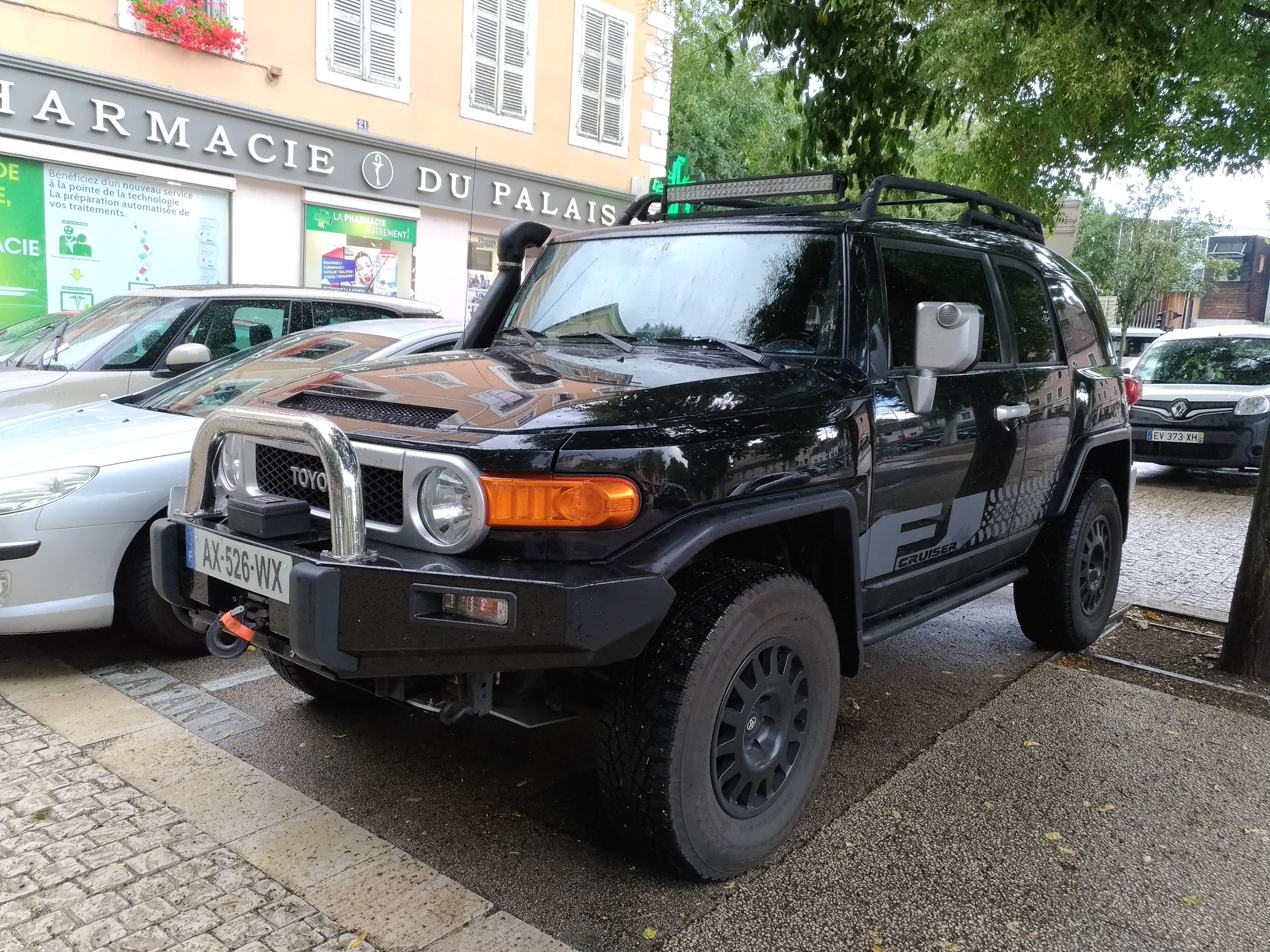
Toyota FJ Cruiser TRD front view

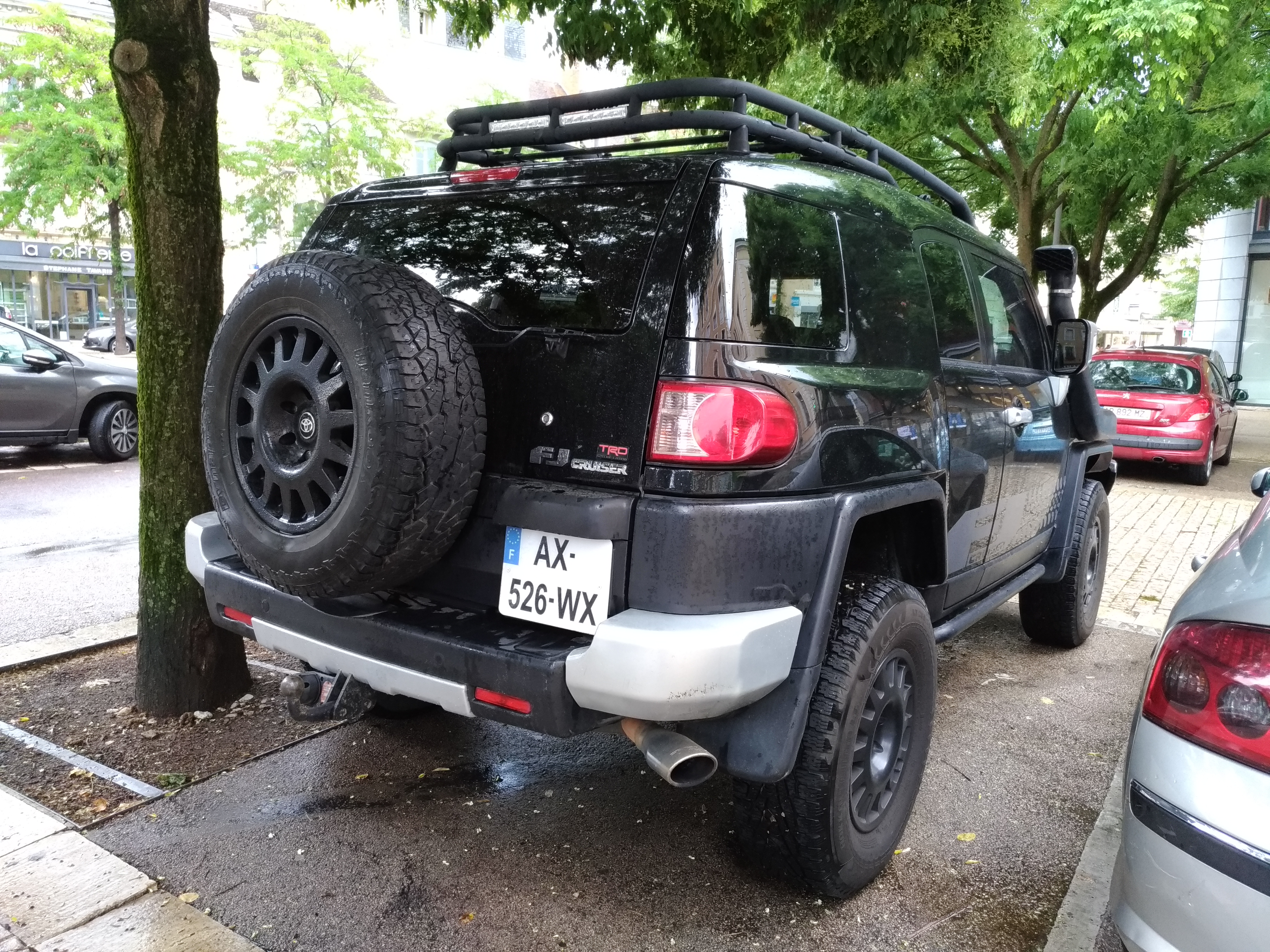
Toyota FJ Cruiser TRD rear view

For North America, in 2007 Toyota Racing Development (TRD) produced 3,200 units as limited production TRD Special Edition FJ Cruisers. This model was released with the body painted in a black diamond pearl color, and with a matching black roof to set itself apart from its standard, white-roofed counterparts. The special edition model included TRD cat-back exhaust system, TRD Bilstein offroad tuned shocks, rock rails, 16-inch alloy gun-metal gray finished TRD wheels with BFGoodrich all-terrain tires, and TRD badges. The TRD Special Edition also included mechanical changes to synchronize the locking differential with the active traction control (resulting in the rear differential no longer overriding the active traction). Early production 2006 FJ Cruisers had an issue that caused the rear differential to override the active traction control, except in the TRD Special Editions. However, by November 2006, Toyota had changed production to incorporate synchronization of the locking differential with active traction control on all FJ Cruisers.

In 2009, subsequent to Toyota releasing the Trail Teams Special Edition FJ Cruiser for the production year of 2008, Toyota created the TRD package. This package was available on FJ Cruisers with the iceberg white monotone exterior color scheme, similar to the 2008 Trail Teams Special Editions, except without the addition of blacked-out trim pieces. Even though this package was known as the "TRD package", it did not include the same or as many features as the TRD Special Edition. Some of the features with this package were the TRD alloy wheels in a silver finish with the BFGoodrich all-terrain tires, as well as TRD logos and graphics on the exterior. Also, the TRD package was only offered on units with two-wheel drive for the 2008 and 2009 model years. Since 2011, Toyota offered the TRD package on the iceberg white FJ Cruisers but opened the package availability to both two- and four-wheel drive models. In 2009, 2,400 units were produced with the TRD package.

=== Trail Teams Special Edition ===
Beginning with the 2008 model year, Toyota manufactured 3,200 units of specially equipped FJ Cruisers designated as the Trail Teams Special Edition, which featured many of the same TRD options included on the TRD Special Edition, including the same 16-inch alloy wheels (but in a black finish as opposed to the gun-metal grey finish of the TRD model). The Trail Teams Special Edition was also equipped with BFGoodrich All-Terrain tires, as well as TRD/Trail Teams Bilstein shocks, and other similar options found on the TRD model. The number of Trail Teams Special Edition FJ Cruisers produced per year are as follows: 3,200 units for 2008 (as stated above); 1,500 for 2010; 2,500 in 2011; 2,500 in 2012; 2,500 in 2013; and 2,500 in 2014. No Trail Teams models were produced in 2009. However, Toyota released a TRD Package for that model year and it was used on the same Iceberg White painted FJ Cruisers that were used for the 2008 Trail Teams Special Edition, (for more information, see the TRD Special Edition section.)

Over the years, small incremental changes have been made to the Trail Teams Special Edition FJ Cruisers, such as changing the TRD alloy wheels to beadlock style TRD wheels on later years, and the availability of Toyota's CRAWL control feature as part of the Trail Teams package (2013 and 2014 automatic transmission only). The CRAWL control had been previously used on other 4-wheel drive vehicles from Toyota and Lexus to enhance off-road capabilities. Each year, the Trail Teams Special Edition is painted in one distinct color and is the only FJ variant (besides the TRD Special Edition units) offered in a monotone color scheme, rather than the traditional two-tone FJ Cruiser with the standard white painted roof (excluding standard production FJ Cruisers with the "Iceberg White" body). The Trail Teams variants are also the only FJ models to have body trim pieces blacked out from the factory including the mirrors, door handles, bumper caps, etc. Special design details also carry over to the interior such as color matched fabric inserts on the seats for specific years and special Trail Teams badges.

==== 2014 Trail Teams Ultimate Edition ====
Toyota announced that the 2014 model year would be the final production year of the FJ Cruiser for the U.S. Market, therefore to add uniqueness to the final version of the Trail Teams Special Edition, Toyota designated the final version to be the Trail Teams Ultimate Edition which features a few special upgrades. The 2014 Trail Teams Ultimate Edition FJ Cruiser comes in a Heritage Blue paint scheme (resembling an original FJ40 Land Cruiser factory paint color), and for the first time features a white grille bezel that again pays tribute to the iconic Land Cruiser FJ40. The remaining vehicle trim remains black, similar to previous versions of the Trail Teams Special Edition. While all of the Trail Teams FJ Cruisers feature a race-inspired TRD/Trail Teams off-road suspension designed by Bilstein, the Ultimate Edition features a new rear remote reservoir suspension. The suspension also raises the vehicle slightly taller than stock as to achieve a leveled stance. The Ultimate Edition is also equipped with a special 1/4-inch thick aluminum TRD skid plate, designed to help with the approach angle for the front of the vehicle and provide better protection while off-roading. Significant interior differences that are unique to the 2014 Trails Team Ultimate Edition include; the interior panel inserts are black rather than color matched to the exterior color of the vehicle, the radio bezel is silver, and a special "Ultimate Edition" dash plaque is affixed to the dash on the passenger side indicating the special edition is only "One of 2500." Additionally, the seating fabric inserts are color matched to coordinate with the Ultimate Edition's unique silver/black interior, rather than the exterior color as in previous years.

The Trail Teams Special Edition color schemes that have been released each year are as follows:

Model Year	Color
2008	Iceberg
2009	None
2010	Sandstorm
2011	Army Green
2012	Radiant Red
2013	Cement Gray
2014	Heritage Blue

=== ARB Edition FJ Crawler ===
The FJ Crawler was first offered in 2007 (for the 2008 model year) and is the result of a collaboration between Dealer Services International (DSI), known for building high quality custom packages for new vehicle dealers, and ARB Corporation who have a long history building rugged off-road products for the Australian market. For participating Toyota new vehicle dealerships, the FJ Crawler could be special ordered for customers who were looking for a vehicle that is even more rugged and off-road ready than a standard Off-Road Package factory option would provide. The FJ Crawler package included an ARB Front Bull Bar Bumper, an Old Man Emu 3-inch suspension lift to support the added weight of the ARB bumper and to allow for the 17-inch Pro Comp wheels with either 33 or 35-inch off-roading tires. The FJ Crawler was able to be customized in many ways with many optional accessories to achieve the customers satisfaction. For example, the FJ Crawler could be ordered in any factory color for the current model year. The customer could choose from 3 different wheel choices, 3 different tire choices, and could even choose the exact springs and shocks used in the Old Man Emu suspension to achieve the desired ride/performance quality. There was also the option of adding accessories such as a Warn winch, IFP driving lights which would be mounted to the ARB bumper, a fog light kit for the ARB bumper, and an ARB roof rack for storing gear and other items. Other options included a cat-back exhaust system, a high flow intake, as well as side steps. Also, because of variances in aftermarket tire sizes, speedometer calibration was provided to ensure correct vehicle speed and mileage are recorded.

Slight changes have been made over the years to the FJ Crawler's options, and in recent years DSI offers new products for the FJ Crawler as well as their own Performance Package including Pro Comp 5" lift kits, 35-inch Pro Comp off-road tires, LRG or Pro Comp alloy wheels, Smittybilt original parts, and other custom accessories that are all selected by the buyer or dealer who orders the vehicle.

=== FJ-S Cruiser Concept ===
The FJ-S Cruiser Concept, debuted at the 2012 SEMA Show in Las Vegas, NV, is the creation of Toyota and Toyota Racing Development (TRD) in an effort to create a new style of FJ Cruiser that from its looks, remains fairly similar, but is designed to be even more off-road ready than its standard FJ Cruiser counterparts. The FJ-S Cruiser Concept actually incorporates suspension components from the Baja Series Tacoma and has an upgraded chassis and body structure with the addition of an underbody "exoskeleton" to improve its off-road prowess. According to Toyota, the extra stiffness and strength provided by the exoskeleton creates a more suitable platform for the suspension modifications and wheel upgrades added, which include 60 mm Bilstein racing shocks up front and 50 mm Bilstein racing shocks with remote reservoirs in the rear which produce around 1.3 inches of lift over stock. Also, the FJ-S features all new TRD 17-inch wheels in a Midnight Black finish along with BFGoodrich Mud-Terrain tires. TRD also added their new supercharger with a Twin Vortex System and a large air-to-water intercooler, which brings the engine output to 345 horsepower and 345 lb⋅ft of torque, which is 30% and 25% of increase over the standard FJ Cruiser model. The exterior of the FJ-S Cruiser Concept received other changes/upgrades including a front nudge bar and the rock rails used on other FJ Cruiser variants. The color Toyota chose for this model is the Quicksand color, but unlike other FJ variants, they kept the white roof as opposed to doing a monochromatic color scheme. The interior of the FJ-S debuted an all-new two-tone leather seating with the FJ-S logos on the seatbacks along with custom floor mats.

Not much information has been released as far as the chassis and body structure changes go, and Toyota hasn't announced what they plan on doing with the FJ-S Cruiser Concept in the future. So whether or not it goes into production in a later year or if it remains a concept car is uncertain. However, new releases from Toyota show that the TRD Bilstein shocks with remote reservoirs and TRD-tuned front spring suspension combination debuted on the FJ-S Cruiser Concept is the same one they used on the Trail Teams Ultimate Edition FJ Cruiser for 2014. Toyota also put the same newly designed TRD Midnight Black alloy wheels used on the FJ-S on the new TRD Pro Series 4Runner.

=== Final Edition ===
==== Japan ====
The "Final Edition" of the FJ Cruiser went on sale in Japan on 12 September 2017. Sales of the FJ Cruiser were discontinued there on 31 January 2018.

==== Middle East ====
The Toyota FJ Cruiser Final Edition was released in the Middle East on 2 October 2022. Production will be limited to just 1,000 units until the end of production in December 2022.

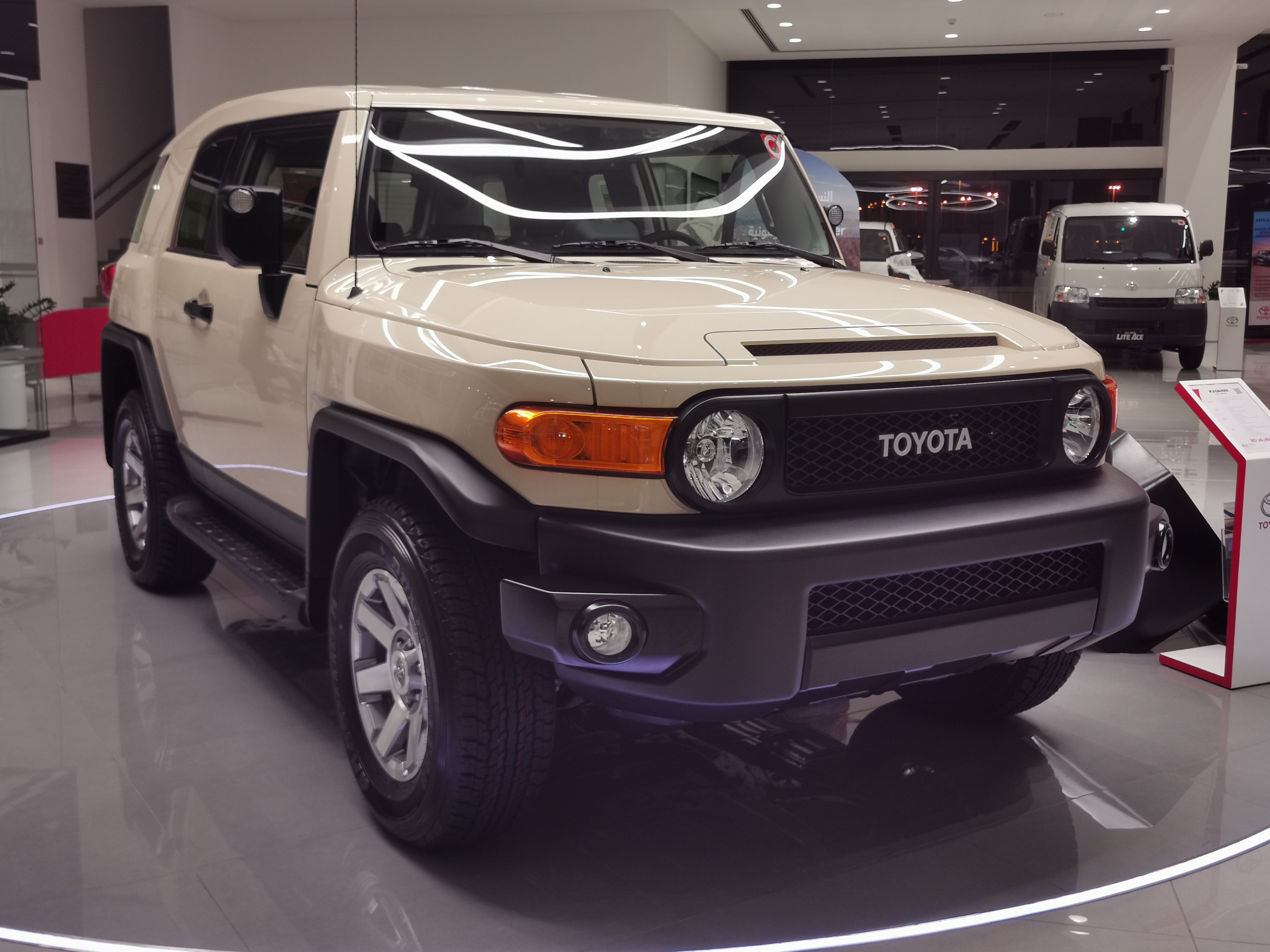
2023 FJ Cruiser Final Edition (Bahrain)

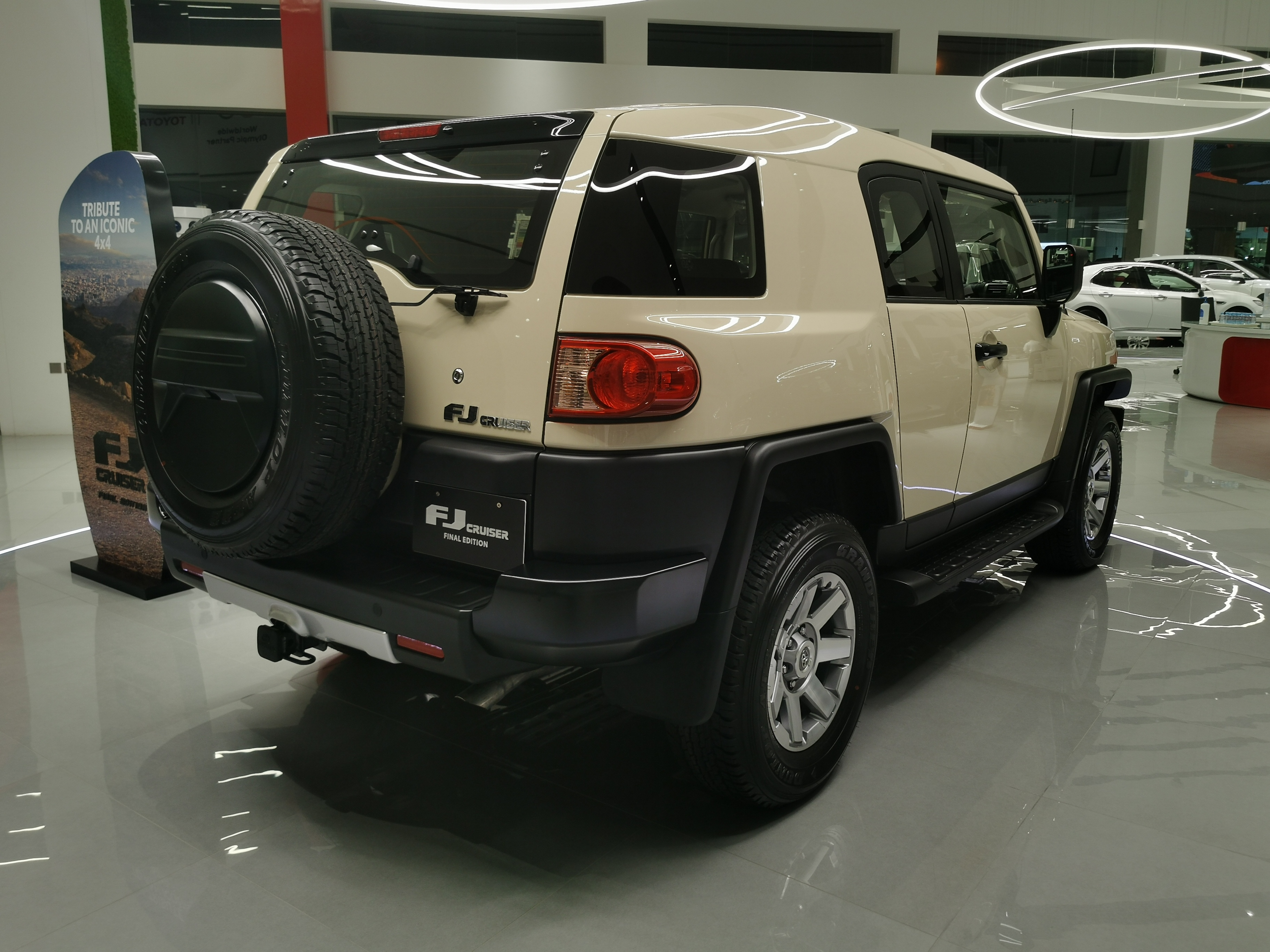
Rear view

== Reception ==
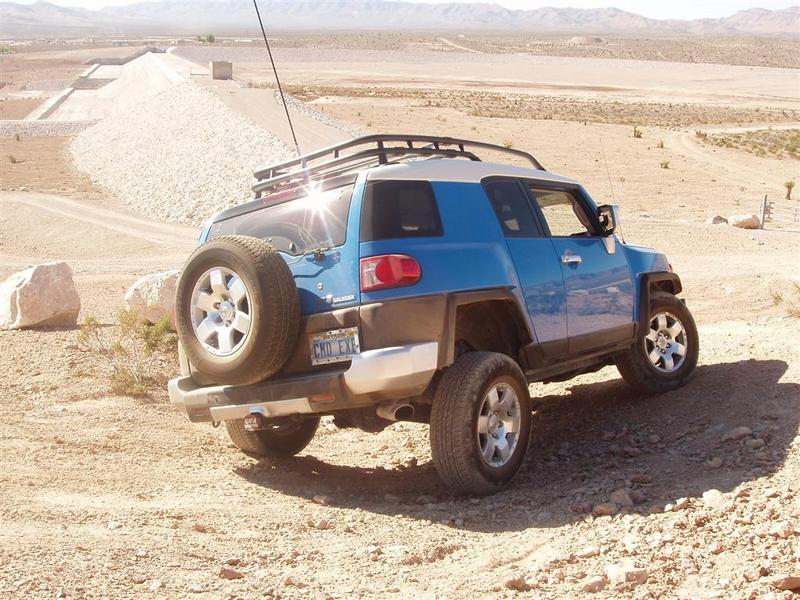
FJ Cruiser with suspension articulated while offroading (US)

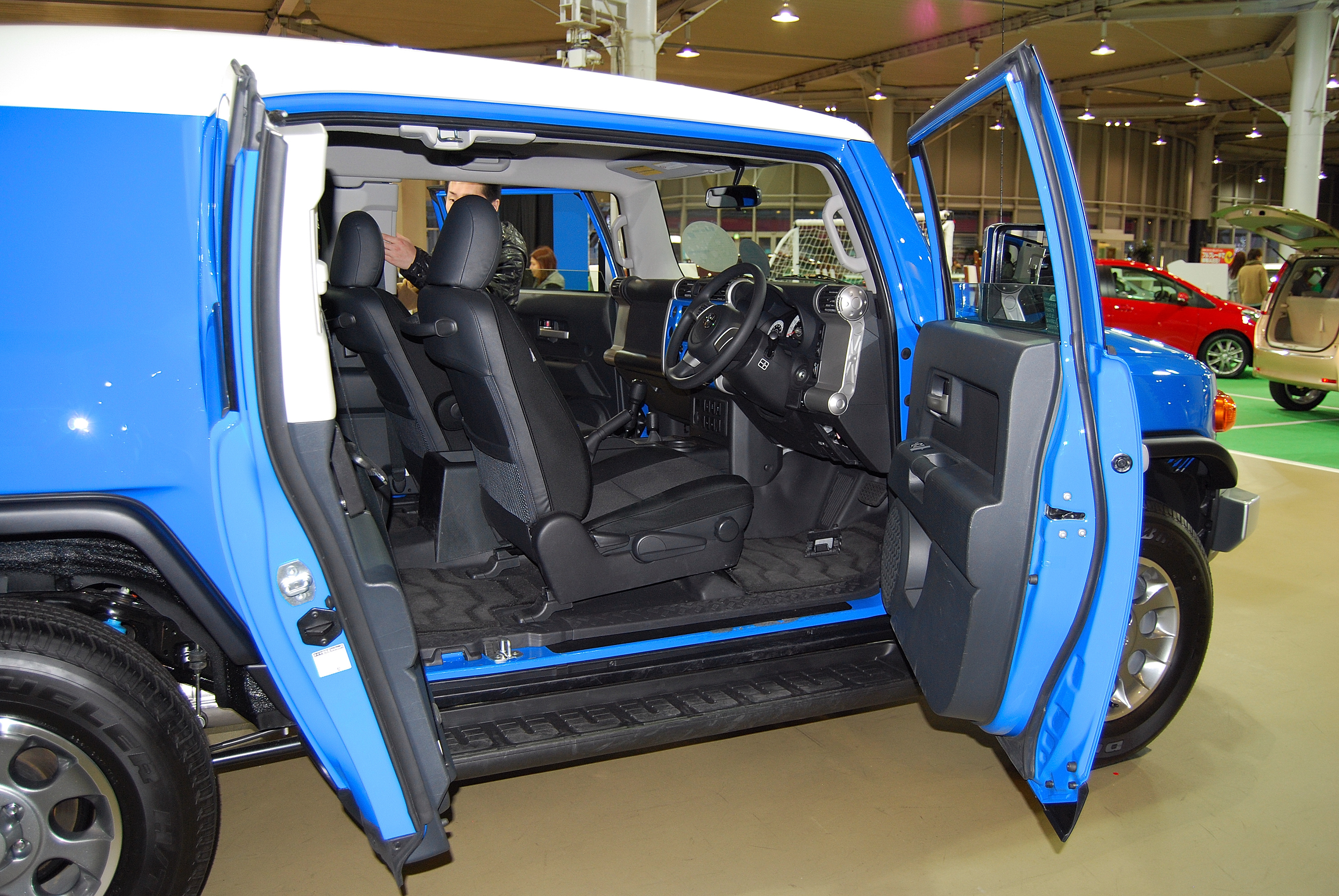
FJ Cruiser with 'Suicide doors' open

The FJ debuted to both criticism and acclaim from the automotive press. Critics appreciated Toyota's drive to bring such an aggressively styled and purpose driven vehicle to market at a time when the company was focused on more conservative designs. The FJ was universally praised for its off-road performance with many reviewers also appreciating its on road manners, functional interior, and styling that paid homage to the original FJ40. The off-road community widely embraced the new addition of another Toyota off-road vehicle and many different groups and forums were created specifically with the FJ Cruiser at their center.

Some reviewers took issue with the amount of body roll and low lateral grip performance though noting the suspension was designed to be soft with a long travel for off-road use.

The FJ Cruiser was also criticized for its styling which created large blindspots, smaller than average cargo capacity, and cramped rear seating that was difficult to access. Toyota attempted to improve the blind spot issues by offering a rear backup camera starting with the 2009 model year and changed the hinge mechanisms on the front seats allowing passengers easier entry and exit from the rear starting with the 2011 model.

== Sales ==
Sales of the FJ Cruiser were strong in the initial years from the initial exuberance surrounding the unique retro styling and performance offered by the FJ. However sales took a sharp nosedive from a high of 56,225 units sold in North America in 2006 to less than 12,000 units by 2009. Critics blamed the declining sales on: (1) increased competition in the mid-size SUV segment; (2) poor fuel economy amidst rising gasoline prices; (3) environmental concerns; and (4) steep competition from the Jeep Wrangler. Toyota hoped to rectify these concerns with an updated engine optimized to run on regular unleaded instead of premium with a slight boost in fuel economy for the 2010 model year.

Calendar year	US	Canada
2006	56,225	4,919
2007	55,170	4,901
2008	28,688	2,630
2009	11,941	899
2010	14,959	797
2011	13,541	639
2012	13,656	726
2013	13,131	656
2014	14,718	618

== See also ==
- List of Toyota vehicles
