= Lotus 62 =

Lotus Type 62
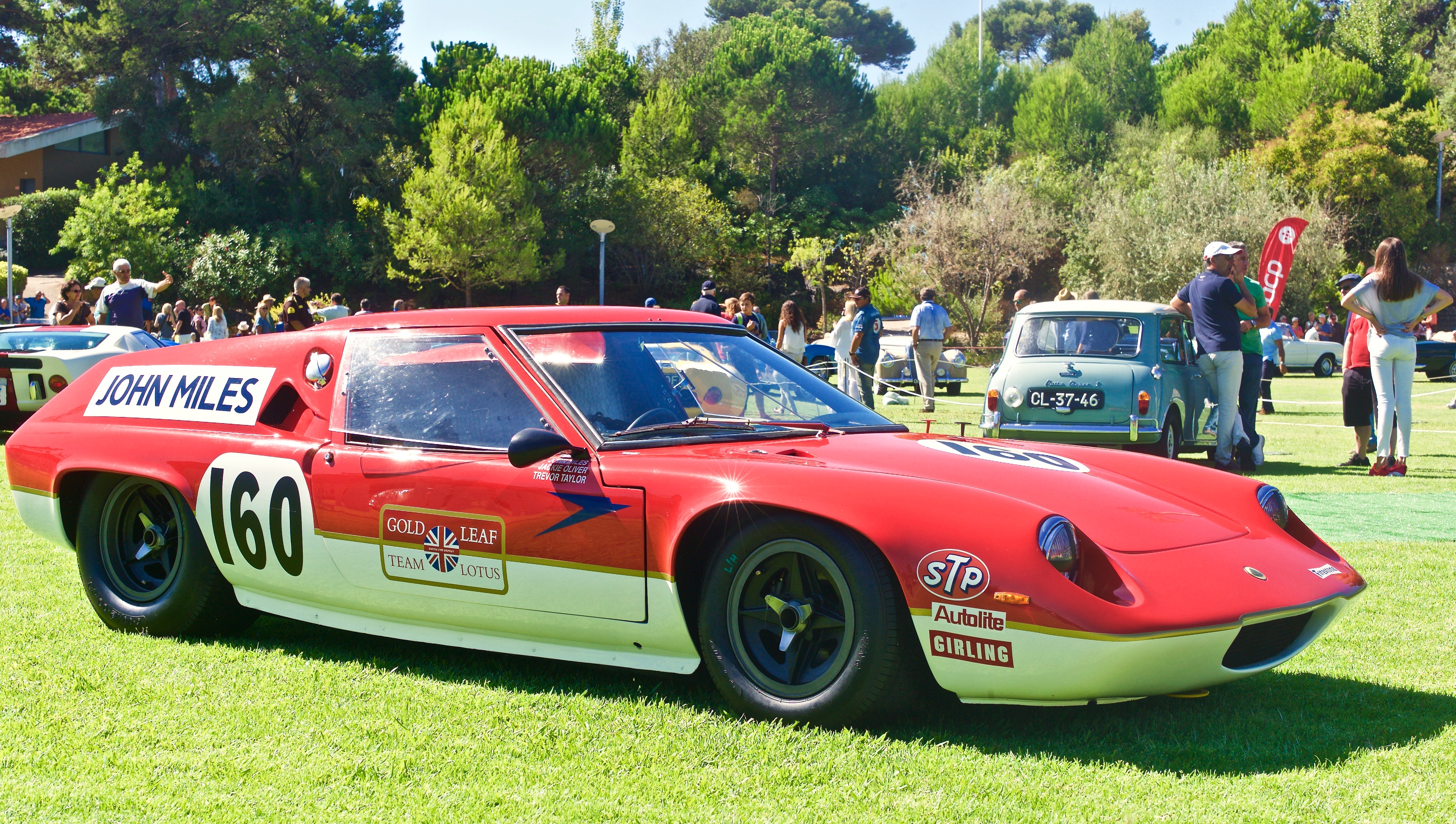
- Category: Group 6 sports car
- Constructor: Lotus
- Designer: Martin Waide

Technical specifications
- Chassis: Steel-reinforced multitubular space frame covered in aluminum panels
- Suspension (front): Double wishbones, coil springs over telescopic shock absorbers
- Suspension (rear): Lower wishbones, top links, twin radius rods and coil springs
- Length: 154 in (3,900 mm)
- Width: 69 in (1,800 mm)
- Axle track: 52 in (1,300 mm) (front and rear)
- Wheelbase: 91 in (2,300 mm)
- Engine: Mid-engined, longitudinally mounted, 1,992 cc (2 L; 122 cu in), Lotus LV/240 later Lotus 906, I-4 engine, NA
- Transmission: ZF 5DS 5-speed manual
- Power: 220–240 hp (160–180 kW)
- Weight: 1,250 lb (570 kg)

Competition history

The Lotus Type 62 race car was a development of the successful Type 47 and intended to race in the Appendix J Group 6 Prototype Class. The car was designed by Martin Waide at Lotus Components and had a space frame chassis, and featured the new Lotus 2.0-litre LV240 (Type 904) DOHC engine (the race program helped develop the Type 907 engine, used to power the Lotus Elite, Esprit, Eclat and Excel).

2 cars were made Chassis numbers #T62/GT/1 & #T62/GT/2

The car had limited competitive success, due mainly to problems with the Vauxhall derived engine block. The car's most successful race was finishing 3rd position at the Tourist Trophy at Oulton Park in 1969.

Race Results Years raced: 1969, 1971-1974 Number of events: 24, Total entries: 30, Finishes: 22, DNF: 7, Wins: 8, Additional class wins: 3, Second place finishes: 3, Third place finishes: 2, Pole positions: 5.

When Colin Chapman removed all links to Vauxhall in 1973 the engines were replaced with Lotus 906 engines.

== Legacy ==
The Lotus Type 62 served as the inspiration for the Lotus-Radford Type 62-2, designed and built by Radford Motors, a British coachbuilding firm.
