= Toyota GR engine =

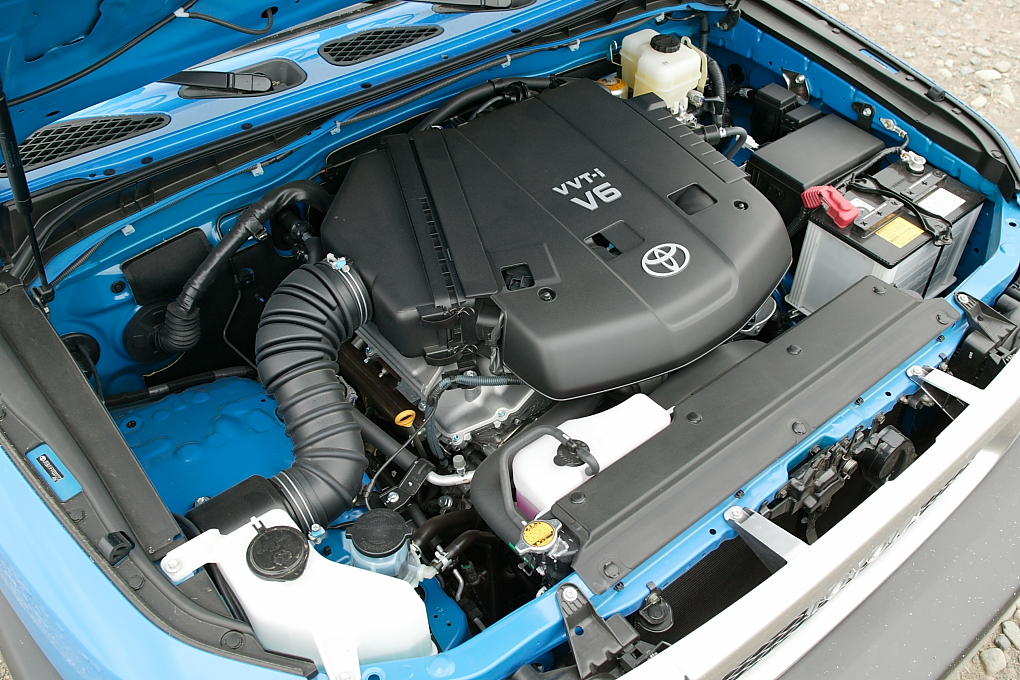
- 1GR-FE engine in a Toyota FJ Cruiser

Overview
- Manufacturer: Toyota Motor Corporation
- Production: 2002–present

Layout
- Configuration: 60° V6
- Cylinder block material: Die-cast aluminium
- Cylinder head material: Aluminium
- Valvetrain: DOHC 4 valves/cyl with VVT-i and timing chain

Combustion
- Fuel type: Gasoline
- Cooling system: Water cooled

Output
- Power output: 236–317 hp (176–236 kW; 239–321 PS)
- Torque output: 266–295 lb⋅ft (361–400 N⋅m)

Chronology
- Predecessor: Toyota MZ engine; Toyota JZ engine (I6); Toyota VZ engine
- Successor: Toyota 8AR-FTS (4GR, 5GR); Toyota T24A engine (1GR, 2GR)

The Toyota GR engine family is a gasoline, open-deck, piston V6 engine series. The GR series has a 60° die-cast aluminium block and aluminium DOHC cylinder heads. The engine series also features 4 valves per cylinder, forged steel connecting rods and crankshaft, one-piece cast camshafts, a timing chain, and a cast aluminium lower intake manifold. Some variants use multi-port fuel injection, some have D4 direct injection, and others have a combination of direct injection and multi-port fuel injection or D4-S.

The GR series replaces the previous MZ V6 and JZ inline-6, and in the case of light trucks the VZ V6.

Note: Power ratings have changed due to SAE measurement changes in 2005 (for the 2006 model year). Toyota rates engines on 87 pump octane, Lexus rates engines on 91 pump octane.

== 1GR ==
=== 1GR-FE ===
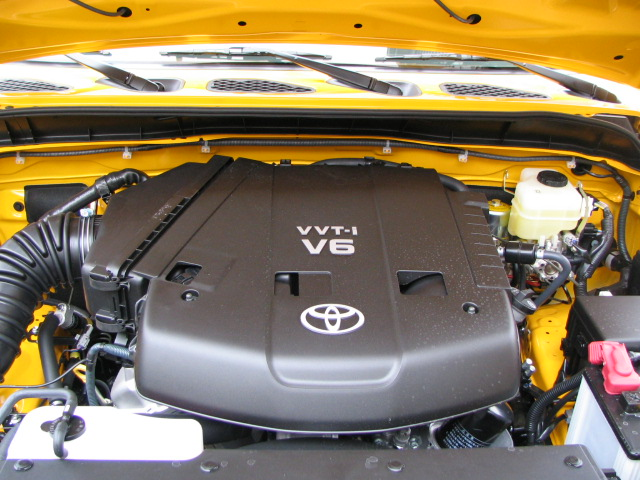
1GR-FE engine in a 2007 Toyota FJ Cruiser

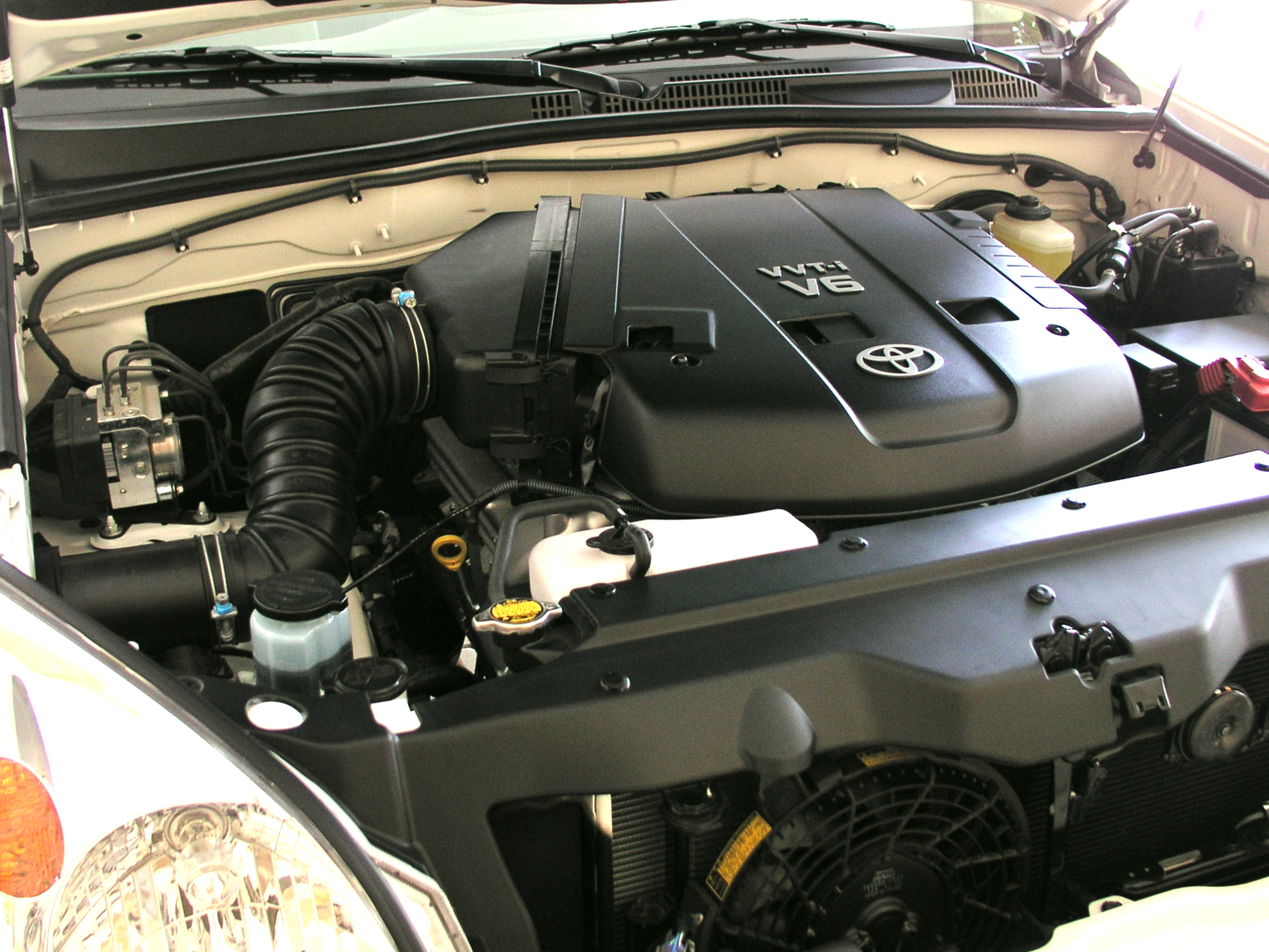
1GR-FE engine in a 2009 Toyota Land Cruiser Prado

The 1GR-FE is the 4.0 L (3,956 cc) version, designed for longitudinal mounting in RWD and 4WD pickup applications. It has a bore and a stroke of 94 mm × 95 mm (3.70 in × 3.74 in). Output is 237 hp (240 PS; 177 kW) at 5200 rpm with 266 lb⋅ft (361 N⋅m; 37 kg⋅m) of torque at 4000 rpm when tuned for 87 octane, and 240 hp (179 kW; 243 PS) at 5200 rpm with 278 lb⋅ft (377 N⋅m; 38 kg⋅m) at 3700 rpm when tuned for 91 octane. This engine features Toyota's VVT-i, variable valve timing system on the intake cam and a compression ratio of 10.0:1. Service weight, including fluids, is 166 kg (366 lb).

An updated version of this engine features Dual VVT-i, increasing output to 267 hp (199 kW; 271 PS) at 5600 rpm and 278 lb⋅ft (377 N⋅m; 38 kg⋅m) at 4400 rpm on 87 octane. Inside, the 1GR uses a "taper-squish" combustion chamber design with matching pistons to improve anti-knocking and engine performance, while also improving intake and fuel efficiency. Toyota adopted a siamese-type intake port, which reduces the surface area of the port walls and prevents fuel from adhering to such walls. This engine has special cast-iron cylinder liners cast into the block, which are a spiny type to improve adhesion between the liner and cylinder block. In the event of cylinder wall damage (scoring, deep protrusions, etc.), the entire cylinder block must be replaced. For increased block rigidity, the 1GR also receives a high temperature plastic insulator/protector, which fills the empty space between the outer portion of the cylinders and block material common to open deck engines. For increased cooling efficiency, the 1GR employs water passages between the bores of the engine. There are two such passages for each bank for a total of four. This reduces cylinder hot-spotting and keeps combustion chamber temperatures more uniform.

A bolt-on TRD supercharger kit was available on the Tacoma and FJ Cruiser but has been discontinued by Toyota.

The new 2015 Toyota HiLux receives a slightly different version of the single VVT-i engine, with the only change being a removal of an air intake baffle tank being replaced by a conventional air filter housing to intake pipe to surge tank style. The new intake pipe now contains resonators. Power output is unchanged.

First generation 1GR-FE variants with single VVT-i features Toyota's Acoustic Control Induction System. This system consists of a bulkhead to divide the intake manifold into two sections, and an intake air control valve (in the bulkhead) to control its effective length. When the engine is operating at moderate revolutions and under high load, an actuator closes the intake air control valve to increase the effective length of the intake manifold. At other operating conditions, the intake air control valve opens up to reduce the effective length of the intake manifold.

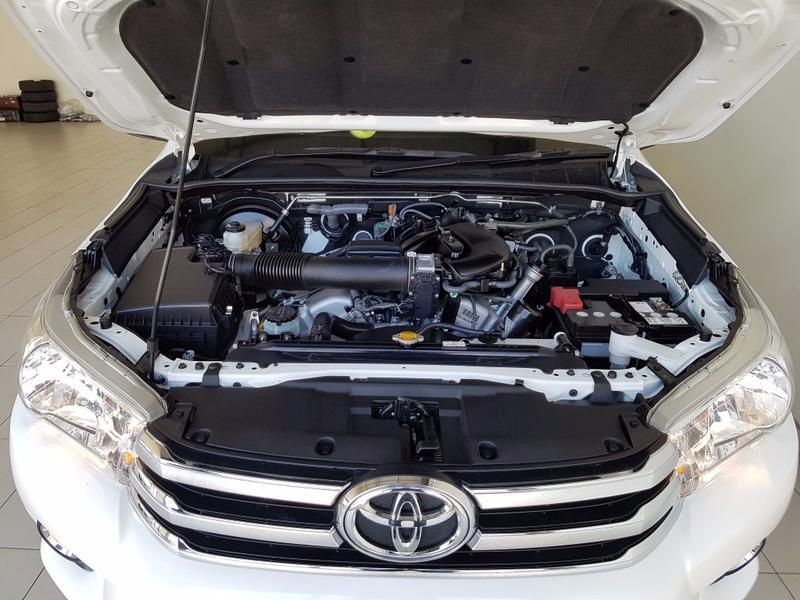
2016 Toyota Hilux V6 engine bay

Applications with VVT-i (calendar years):

- 2002–2009 Toyota 4Runner / Hilux Surf (GRN210/215)
- 2007–2011 Toyota Land Cruiser (GRJ200)
- 2002–2009 Toyota Land Cruiser Prado (GRJ120/121/125)
- 2004–2015 Toyota Tacoma (GRN225/245/250/265/270)
- 2005–2015 Toyota Hilux (GGN10/20)
- 2005–2006 Toyota Tundra (GSK30)
- 2006–2009 Toyota Tundra (GSK50/51)
- 2005–2015 Toyota Fortuner (GGN50/60)
- 2006–2009 Toyota FJ Cruiser (GSJ10/15)
- 2009–present Toyota Land Cruiser 70
- 2015–present Toyota Hilux

Applications with Dual VVT-i (calendar years):

- 2009–2024 Toyota 4Runner (GRN280/285)
- 2009–2022 Toyota FJ Cruiser
- 2011–2014 Toyota Tundra (GSK50/51)
- 2012–2021 Toyota Land Cruiser (GRJ200)
- 2021–present Toyota Land Cruiser (GRJ300)
- 2012–2023 Lexus GX 400 (GRJ150)
- 2015–present Toyota Fortuner
- 2009–2023 Toyota Land Cruiser Prado (GRJ150/150R/155)

== 2GR ==
=== 2GR-FE ===
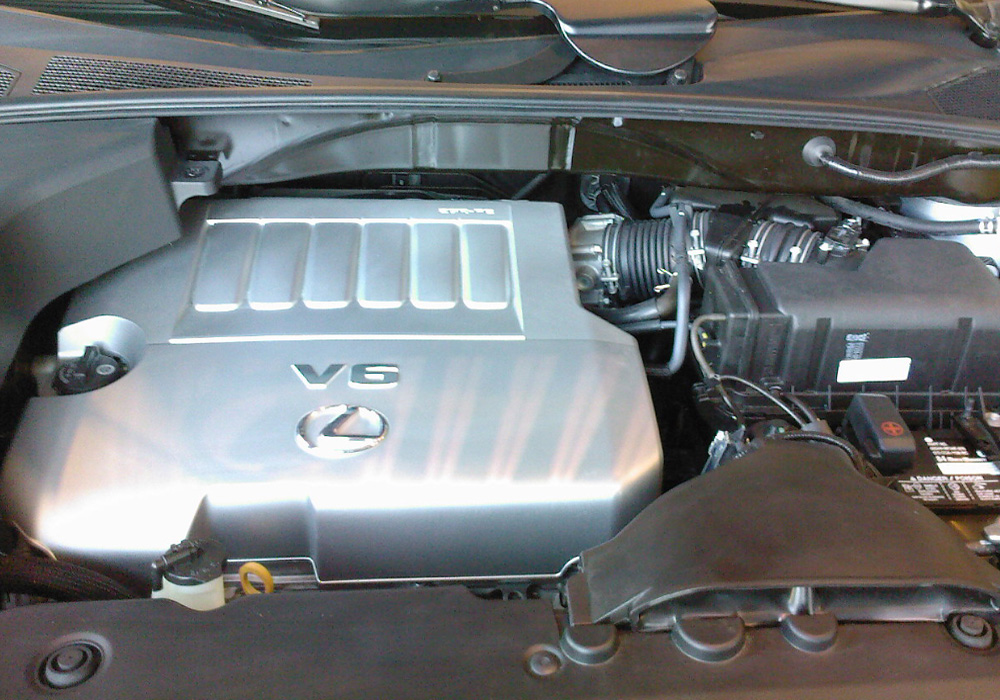
2GR-FE engine in the 2008 Lexus RX 350

The 2GR-FE is a 3.5 L (3,456 cc) version. Bore remains at 94 mm (3.7 in); but stroke is reduced to 83 mm (3.27 in). Reported output varies depending on the vehicle application, but is approximately 268 hp (200 kW; 272 PS) to 314 hp (234 kW; 318 PS) at 6200 rpm with 248 lb⋅ft (336 N⋅m) to 260 lb⋅ft (353 N⋅m) of torque at 4700 rpm on 87 octane (R+M/2). This version features Toyota's Dual VVT-i, variable valve timing on both the intake and exhaust cams. The cams are driven using a timing chain.

Valves are driven by roller-follower rocker arms with low friction roller bearings, and a unique, concave cam lobe design to increase valve lift over the traditional shimless lifter type system of the 1GR-FE. This increases overall cylinder head height to accommodate the slightly taller roller rocker system. Moreover, the cylinder head is segmented into 3 parts: valve cover, camshaft sub-assembly housing, and cylinder head sub-assembly. As such, this valvetrain is used across all other GR engines with Dual VVT-i. Its service weight is 163 kg (359 lb).

This engine has a robust aftermarket community and is a candidate for engine swaps, such as into the SW20 MR2. It has primarily been used in K platform vehicles.

Applications (calendar years):

- 2005–2012 Toyota Avalon (GSX30)
- 2012–2018 Toyota Avalon (GSX40)
- 2006–2012 Toyota Aurion (GSV40)
- 2012–2017 Toyota Aurion (GSV50)
- 2005–2012 Toyota RAV4/Vanguard (GSA33/38)
- 2006–2019 Toyota Estima/Previa/Tarago (GSR50/55)
- 2006–2011 Toyota Camry (GSV40)
- 2011–2017 Toyota Camry (GSV50)
- 2006–2012 Lexus ES 350 (GSV40)
- 2012–2018 Lexus ES 350 (GSV60)
- 2007–2009 Lexus RX 350/Toyota Harrier (GSU30/31/35/36)
- 2009–2015 Lexus RX 350 (GGL10/15/16)
- 2007–2016 Toyota Highlander/Kluger (GSU40/45/50/55)
- 2007–2012 Toyota Blade Master (GRE156)
- 2007–2013 Toyota Mark X Zio (GGA10)
- 2008–2015 Toyota Alphard/Vellfire (GGH20/25)
- 2015–2017 Toyota Alphard/Vellfire (GGH30/35)
- 2008–2016 Toyota Venza (GGV10/15)
- 2020–2023 Lexus LM 350 (Hong Kong only)
- 2009–2021 Lotus Evora (280 PS (206 kW; 276 hp) & 350 N⋅m (258 lb⋅ft) using Lotus engine management, Sport Pack package redline increased to 7000 rpm)
- 2007–2016 Toyota Sienna (GSL20/23/25/30/33/35)
- 2009–present Bolwell Nagari 300
- Toyota Corolla (E140/E150) (for Super GT use)
- Lotus Evora GTE (modified 4 litre version with 470 hp (477 PS; 350 kW) NA for race use in the ALMS and at the 24 Hours of Le Mans)

Supercharged (calendar years):

- 2007–2009 TRD Aurion (TRD supercharger)
- 2009–present Bolwell Nagari 300 (Sprintex supercharger)
- 2011–2016 Lotus Evora S (345 hp (350 PS; 257 kW), 295 lb⋅ft (400 N⋅m))
- 2012–2021 Lotus Exige S/350/360/380/410/430 (345–430 hp (350–436 PS; 257–321 kW), 295–325 lb⋅ft (400–441 N⋅m))
- 2017–2021 Lotus Evora 400 (400 hp (406 PS; 298 kW), 410 hp (416 PS; 306 kW), 430 hp (436 PS; 321 kW))
- 2022–present Lotus Emira

=== 2GR-FSE ===
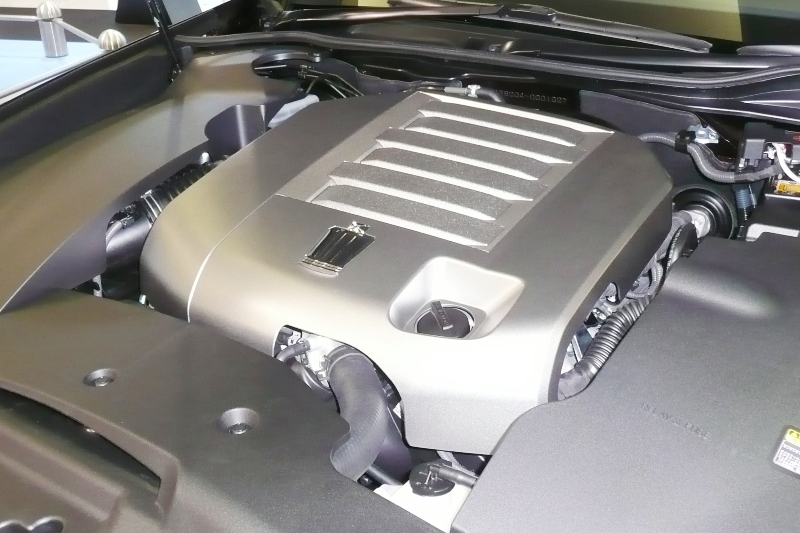
2GR-FSE engine in the 2008 Crown

The 2GR-FSE is a 3.5 L (3,456 cc) engine used in the Lexus IS, GS, Mark X and Crown and incorporates Toyota's latest D-4S twin injection fuel system. This system combines direct injection (949 cc (57.9 cu in)/min injectors) with traditional port injection (298 cc (18.2 cu in)/min injectors). Direct injection lowers the tendency to knock (detonation) and increases performance by reducing the charge intake temperature. Traditionally, direct injection engines require an in-engine mechanism such as swirl ports or specific piston crown shapes to increase air turbulence in the engine. These are in place to help achieve a homogeneous air-fuel mixture inside the cylinder at low RPM and high load, but these mechanisms inhibit performance at higher engine speeds. In the 2GR-FSE, port injection is used considerably to achieve the correct mixture without having in-engine restrictions, meaning the engine achieves specific power near the top of all naturally aspirated production gasoline engines in the world (68 kW (92.5 PS; 91.2 hp)/L, 234 kW (318 PS; 314 hp) in the Mark X). Toyota also developed a new type of injector for this engine. The dual fan spray pattern of the direct injectors is perpendicular to the piston travel with wide dispersion in the cylinder, which aids air and fuel mixture and therefore increases power and efficiency. The port injectors not only help improve the power and efficiency but they also help improve emissions, especially in the first 20 seconds after start-up (when the catalytic converter is in its warm-up stage). Compression ratio is 11.8:1.

The 2GR-FSE engine is rated at 227–236 kW (309–321 PS; 304–316 hp) at 6,400 RPM and 377–380 N⋅m (38–39 kg⋅m; 278–280 lb⋅ft) at 4,800 RPM.

The engine's service weight is 174 kg (384 lb).

The 2GR-FSE was on the Ward's 10 Best Engines list for 2006, 2007, 2008 and 2009.

Applications (calendar years):

- 2005 Toyota Crown Athlete (GRS184, 315 PS (232 kW; 311 hp) and 38.4 kg⋅m (377 N⋅m; 278 lb⋅ft) at 4,800 RPM)
- 2005 Lexus GS 350 (GRS191/196)
- 2005 Lexus GS 450h (GWS191)
- 2005–2013 Lexus IS 350 (GSE21/26, 310 PS (228 kW; 306 hp) and 375 N⋅m (38 kg⋅m; 277 lb⋅ft) @4800 RPM)
- 2008 Toyota Crown Athlete (GRS204)
- 2008 Toyota Crown Hybrid (GWS204)
- 2009 Toyota Mark X (GRX133, 318 PS (234 kW; 314 hp) and 38.7 kg⋅m (380 N⋅m; 280 lb⋅ft) at 4,800 RPM)
- 2013–2015 Lexus GS 350 (GRL10/15)
- 2013–2017 Lexus IS 350 (GSE31/36)
- 2013–2017 Lexus IS 300 AWD (GSE37, 255 hp (259 PS; 190 kW) and 320 N⋅m (33 kg⋅m; 236 lb⋅ft) at 2,000 - 4,800 RPM)
- 2014–2017 Lexus RC 350
- 2015 Toyota Mark X GRMN (236 kW (321 PS; 316 hp) and 380 N⋅m (39 kg⋅m; 280 lb⋅ft) at 4,800 RPM)

Supercharged:

- 2009 Toyota Mark X +M Supercharger (265 kW (360 PS; 355 hp))

=== 2GR-FXE ===
Atkinson cycle, VVT-i, uses cooled EGR system.

For the Lexus RX 450h, the compression ratio was 12.5:1. For the Lexus GS 450h, the compression ratio was 13.0:1.

Applications (calendar years):

- 2009–2015 Lexus RX 450h, (GYL10/15/16), without D-4S (conventional multi-port indirect injection) 245 bhp (183 kW; 248 PS)
- 2010 Toyota Highlander Hybrid, without D-4S (conventional multi-port indirect injection) 245 bhp (183 kW; 248 PS)
- 2012 Lexus GS 450h (GWL10), with D-4S (both multi-port indirect and direct injection) 292 bhp (218 kW; 296 PS)
- 2013 Toyota Crown Majesta, with D-4S (both multi-port indirect and direct injection) 292 bhp (218 kW; 296 PS)

=== 2GR-FKS ===
The 2GR-FKS is a 3.5-litre (3,456 cc), 24-valve DOHC (with VVT-iW and VVT-i) V6 engine that combines the D-4S system from the 2GR-FSE with the simulated on-demand Atkinson cycle used in the 2UR-GSE and 8AR-FTS engines. The 2GR-FKS and the 2GR-FXS selectively use direct and port injection. This engine first appeared in the 2015 Lexus RX 350.

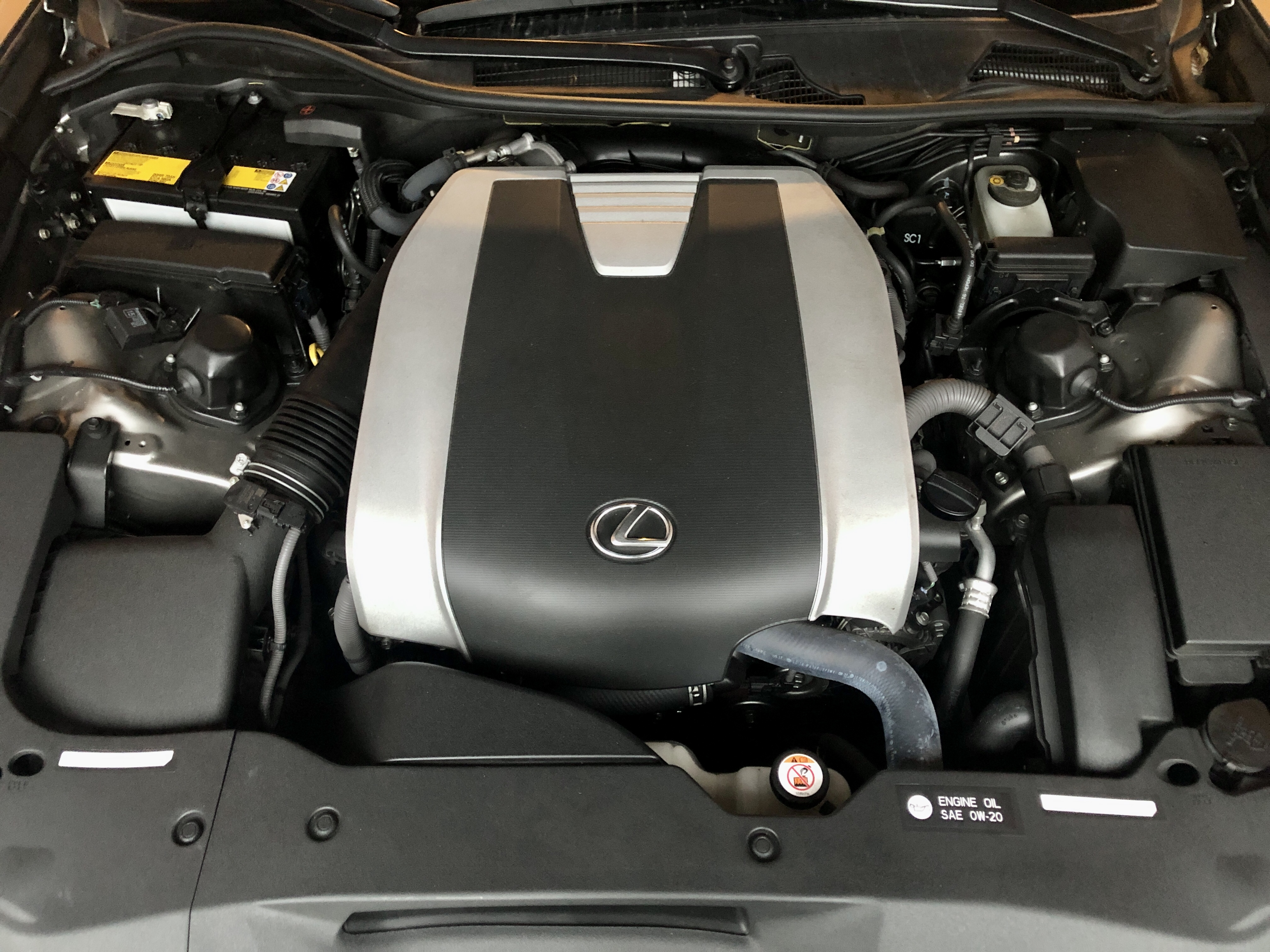
Toyota 2GR-FKS engine in a Lexus GS350

Applications (calendar years):

- 2015–2023 Toyota Tacoma (GRN305/310/325/330) 278 hp (207 kW; 282 PS)
- 2015–2020 Lexus GS 350 (GRL12/16) 311 hp (315 PS; 232 kW)
- 2015–2022 Lexus RX 350 (GGL20/25) 295 hp (220 kW; 299 PS)
- 2017–present Lexus LS 350 (GSF50) 318 PS (234 kW; 314 hp) (China)
- 2017–2019 Toyota Highlander (GSU50/55) 295 hp (220 kW; 299 PS)
- 2017–2020 Toyota Sienna (GSL30/33/35) 296 hp (221 kW; 300 PS)
- 2017–2024 Toyota Camry (GSV70) 301 hp (224 kW; 305 PS)
- 2018–2023 Toyota Alphard (GGH30) 296 hp (221 kW; 300 PS)
- 2018–2022 Toyota Avalon (GSX50) 301 hp (224 kW; 305 PS)
- 2018–present Lexus IS 350 (XE30) 311 hp (232 kW; 315 PS)
- 2018–2025 Lexus ES 350 (XZ10) 302 hp (225 kW; 306 PS)
- 2018–2025 Lexus RC 350 (GSC10) 311 hp (232 kW; 315 PS)
- 2019–2022 Toyota Highlander (GSU70/75) 295 hp (220 kW; 299 PS)
- 2020–2023 Lexus LM 350 (AH30) 296 hp (221 kW; 300 PS)

=== 2GR-FXS ===
The 2GR-FXS is the hybrid version of the 2GR-FKS.

Applications (calendar years; net combined horsepower listed):

- 2015–2022 Lexus RX 450h (GYL20/25) 308 hp (230 kW; 312 PS)
- 2016–2019 Toyota Highlander (GVU58) 306 hp (228 kW; 310 PS)
- 2023–2026 Lexus TX 550h+ (GYU15) 404 hp (301 kW; 410 PS) plug-in hybrid
- 2023–present Toyota Century (SUV) (GRG75) 406 hp (303 kW; 412 PS) plug-in hybrid

== 3GR ==
=== 3GR-FE ===
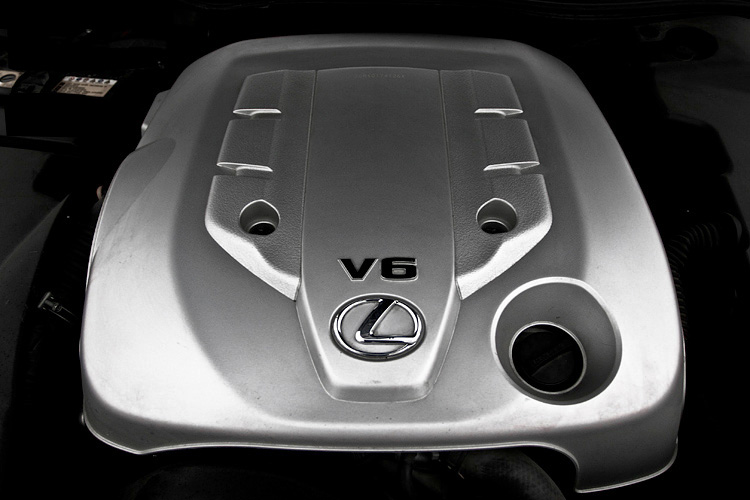
3GR-FE engine in the 2007 IS 300

The 3GR-FE is a 3.0 L (2,994 cc) version with Dual VVT-i, designed for RWD longitudinal mounting. Bore is 87.5mm while stroke is shared with the 2GR at 83 mm, with a compression ratio of 10.5:1. Output is 170 kW (228 hp; 231 PS) at 6,400 RPM, and 300 N⋅m (221 lb⋅ft) at 4,800 RPM.

Applications (calendar years):

- 2003 Toyota Crown (GRS182) (China, Asia-Pacific ex. Japan)
- Hongqi HQ3 – rebadged Crown sold in China
- 2005 Toyota Reiz (GRX121) (China)
- 2005 Lexus GS 300 (GRS190) (Middle East, Asia-Pacific ex. Japan)
- 2007 Lexus IS 300 & IS 300 C (GSE22) (Middle East, Asia-Pacific ex. Japan)

=== 3GR-FSE ===
The 3GR-FSE adds D-4 direct injection. The 3GR-FSE engine is rated at 256 PS (188 kW; 252 hp) at 6,200 rpm and 32 kg⋅m (314 N⋅m; 231 lb⋅ft) at 3,600 rpm .

Applications (calendar years):

- 2004 Toyota Mark X (GRX121) (Japan)
- 2003 Toyota Crown Royal & Athlete (GRS182/183) (Japan)
- 2006 Lexus GS 300 (GRS190/195) (Europe & North America)
- 2008 Toyota Crown Royal (GRS202/203) (Japan)

Supercharged

- 2006-2009 Toyota Mark X Supercharged 320 PS (235 kW; 316 hp)

== 4GR ==
=== 4GR-FSE ===
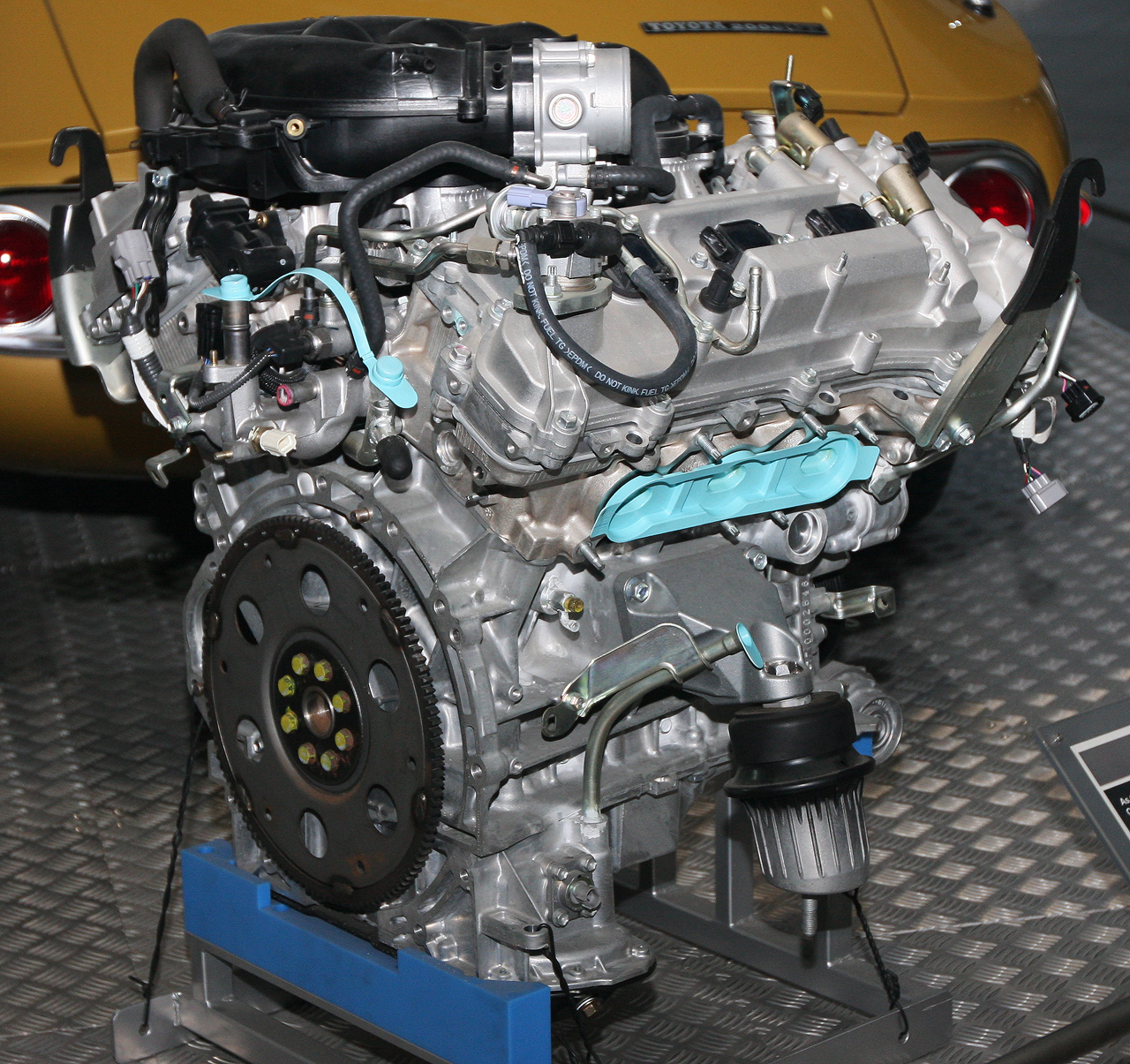
2004 Toyota 4GR-FSE engine.

The 4GR-FSE is a 2.5 L (2,499 cc) version. Bore is 83 mm (3.27 in) while stroke is reduced to 77 mm (3.03 in) with a compression ratio of 12.0:1. Output is 203–215 PS (149–158 kW; 200–212 hp) at 6,400 RPM and 24.78–26.5 kg⋅m (243–260 N⋅m; 179–192 lb⋅ft) at 3,800 RPM. This version also features Dual VVT-i, variable valve timing on both the intake and exhaust cams and an improved D4 direct injection system.

Applications (calendar years):

- 2003 Toyota Crown Royal & Athlete (GRS180/181) (Japan)
- 2004 Toyota Mark X (GRX120/125) (Japan)
- 2005–2013 Lexus IS 250 (GSE20/25)
- 2008–2012 Toyota Crown Royal & Athlete (GRS200/201) (Japan)
- 2009–2019 Toyota Mark X (GRX130/135) (Japan)
- 2006–2015 Lexus IS 250C (GSE20)
- 2012–2015 Lexus GS 250
- 2012–2018 Toyota Crown Royal (Japan)
- 2013–2015 Lexus IS 250 (GSE30/35)

== 5GR ==
=== 5GR-FE ===
The 5GR-FE is a 2.5 L (2,497 cc) version. Bore is 87.5 mm (3.44 in) while stroke is 69.2 mm (2.72 in) with a compression ratio of 10.0:1. Output is 145 kW (194 hp; 197 PS) at 6,200 RPM and 24.7 kg⋅m (242 N⋅m; 179 lb⋅ft) at 4,400 RPM. This version does not include direct injection, but does include Dual VVT-i. The 5GR-FE engine is only built in China for vehicles for the Chinese market. Using the same bore as the 3GR-FE which is also built in China it can be built on the same production line, thus reducing production cost.

Applications (calendar years):

- 2005 Toyota Reiz (GRX122) (China)
- 2005 Toyota Crown (GRS188) (China)

== 6GR ==
=== 6GR-FE ===
The 6GR-FE is a 4.0 L (3,956 cc) version. Bore is 94 mm (3.7 in) while stroke is 95 mm (3.74 in). This version does not include direct injection, but does include Dual VVT-i and is similar to the updated Dual VVT-i 1GR-FE, engine output is 229 hp (171 kW; 232 PS) at 5,000 RPM and 345 N⋅m (35.2 kg⋅m; 254 lb⋅ft) at 4,400 RPM.

Applications (calendar years):

- 2013 Toyota Coaster (GRB53) (China)

== 7GR ==
=== 7GR-FKS ===
The 7GR-FKS is a 3.5 L (3,456 cc) version. Bore and stroke is 94 mm × 83 mm (3.70 in × 3.27 in). This version features a D-4S combined injection system (meaning it uses both MPFi and GDi) and includes Dual VVT-i and is similar to the 2GR-FKS, engine output is 278 hp (282 PS; 207 kW) at 6,000 RPM and 365 N⋅m (37.2 kg⋅m; 269 lb⋅ft) at 4,500 RPM.

Applications (calendar years):

- 2015–2020 Toyota Land Cruiser Prado (GRJ152L) (China)
- 2019–present Toyota HiAce (GRH300)

== 8GR ==
=== 8GR-FKS ===
The 8GR-FKS is a 3.5 L (3,456 cc) version. Bore and stroke is 94 mm × 83 mm (3.70 in × 3.27 in). The 8GR-FKS includes on-demand Atkinson cycle, engine output is 315 PS (232 kW; 311 hp) at 6,600 rpm and 380 N⋅m (280 lb⋅ft) at 4,800 rpm.

Applications (calendar years):

- 2017 Lexus LS 350 (GSF50)

=== 8GR-FXS ===
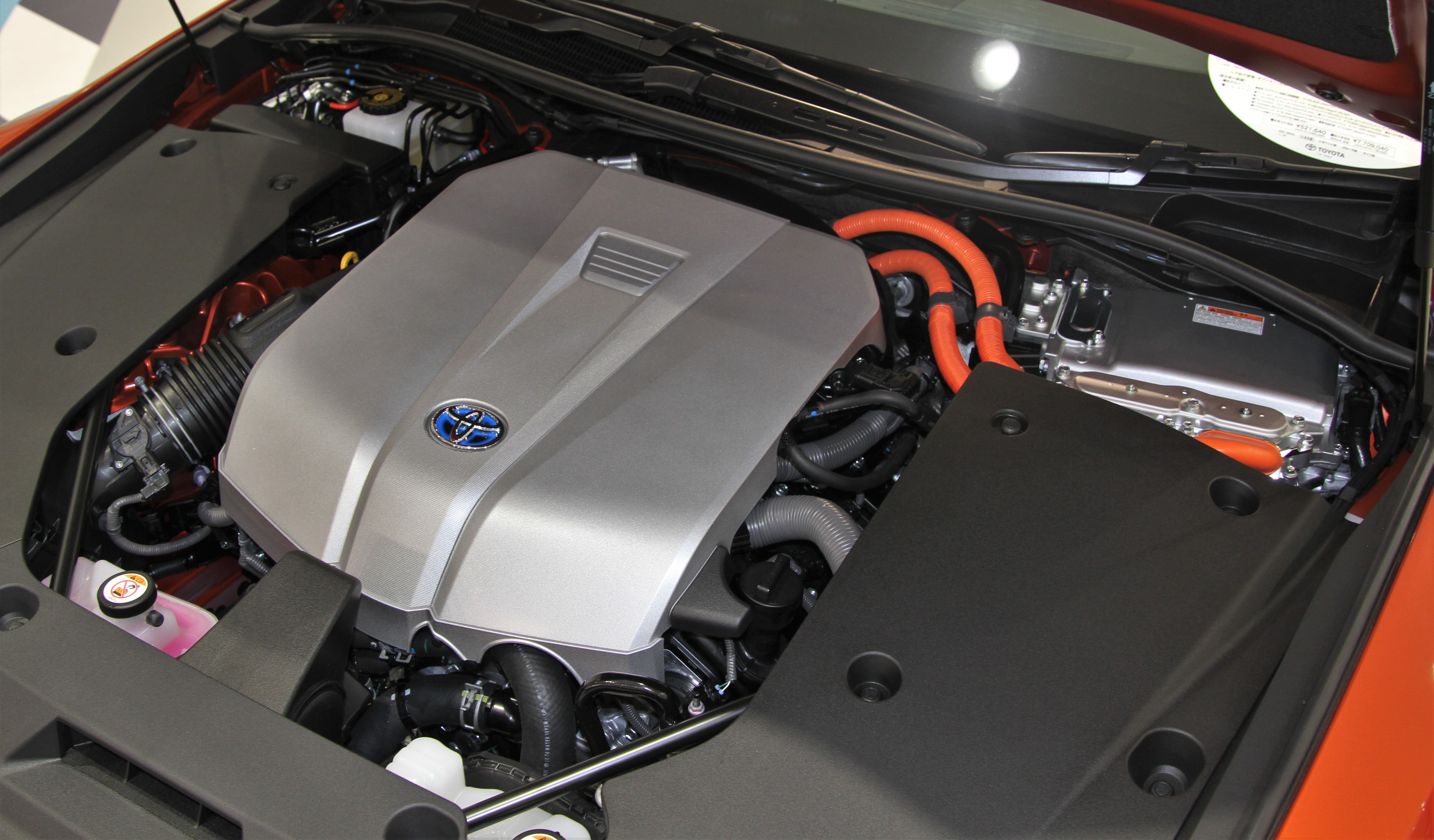
8GR-FXS

The 8GR-FXS is a 3.5 L (3,456 cc) version. Bore and stroke is 94 mm × 83 mm (3.70 in × 3.27 in) with a compression ratio of 13.0:1. Used in hybrid applications, and including on-demand Atkinson cycle, engine output is 295 hp (220 kW; 299 PS) at 6,600 RPM and 350 N⋅m (36 kg⋅m; 260 lb⋅ft) at 5,100 RPM. The 8GR-FXS uses a similar fuel setup to the 2GR-FKS, combining the D-4S system and the simulated on-demand Atkinson cycle used in the 2UR-GSE and 8AR-FTS engines. The intake camshafts are equipped with VVT-iW and the exhaust camshafts are equipped with VVT-i.

Applications (calendar years):

- 2017 Lexus LC 500h (GWZ100)
- 2017 Lexus LS 500h (GVF50)
- 2018 Toyota Crown (GWS224)

== See also ==
- List of Toyota engines
- List of Toyota transmissions
