= Lexus GX =

Luxury SUV model from Lexus

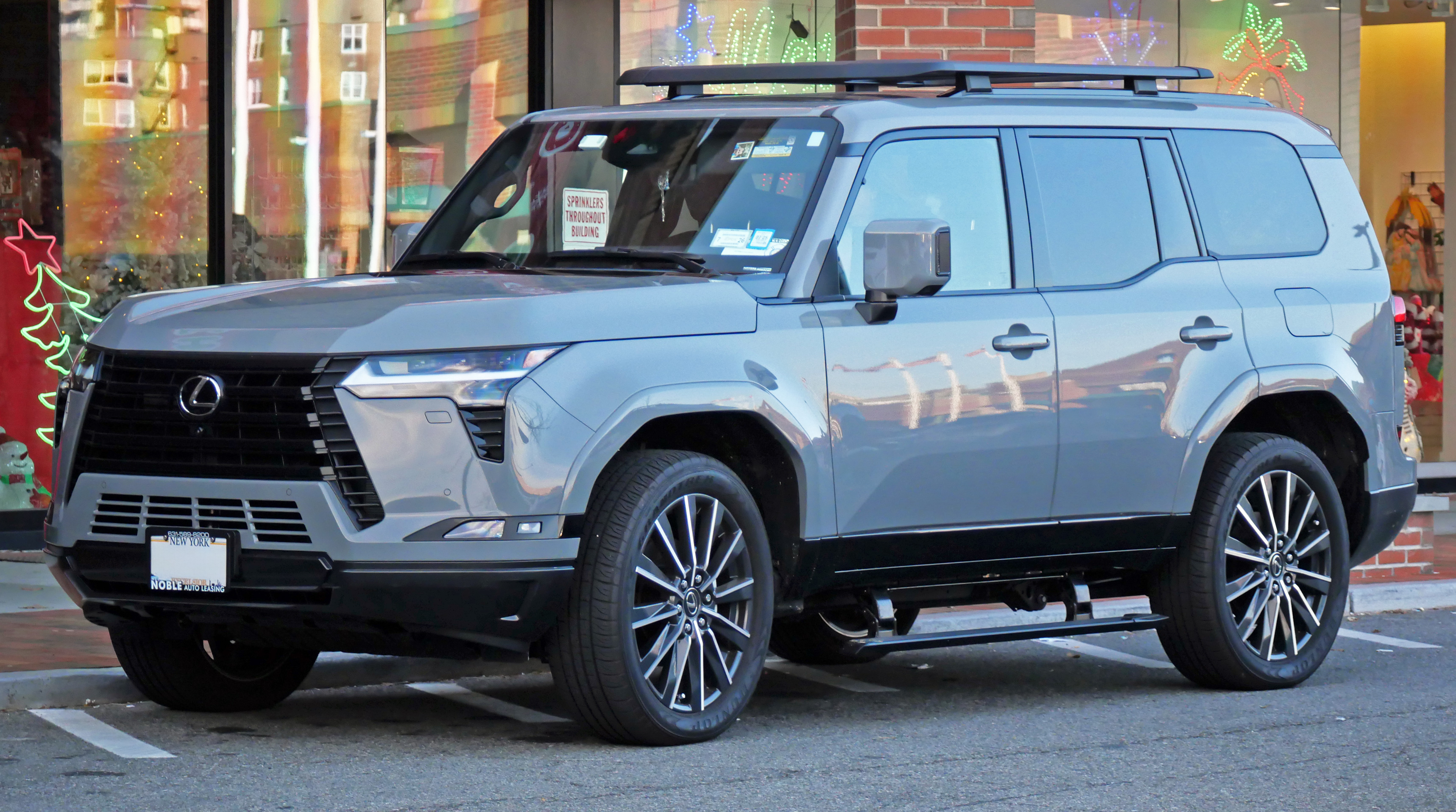
- 2024 Lexus GX 550 (J250)

Overview
- Manufacturer: Toyota
- Also called: Toyota Land Cruiser Prado
- Production: 2002–present
- Model years: 2003–present
- Assembly: Japan: Tahara, Aichi (Tahara plant)

Body and chassis
- Class: Mid/full-size luxury SUV
- Body style: 5-door SUV
- Layout: Front-engine, four-wheel-drive
- Chassis: Body-on-frame

The Lexus GX (Japanese: レクサス・GX, Hepburn: Rekusasu GX) is a mid/full-size luxury SUV sold in North American and Eurasian markets by Lexus, a luxury division of Toyota. The GX is based on the Toyota Land Cruiser Prado, from which it derives its off-road capability.

Lexus introduced the first generation, known as the GX 470 in 2002, and subsequently became the third SUV to enter the Lexus lineup. A full-time four-wheel drive system is standard with low-range gearing. The 4.7-liter V8 engine in the GX 470 was the same as used on the larger LX 470. The firm next introduced the second-generation model in 2009, badged GX 460 to reflect the switch to a 4.6-liter V8 engine. Lexus later released a lower displacement GX 400 in 2012 for the Chinese market, with a 4.0-liter V6 engine. The third-generation model introduced in 2023 uses the GX 550 moniker with a twin-turbocharged 3.4-liter V6 engine and GX 550h with a turbocharged hybrid electric 2.4-liter four-cylinder engine.

As of 2024, the GX is positioned between the larger LX or TX and the smaller RX. Though it is thought the GX has always been larger than the RX, from 2015 to 2022, the RX is slightly longer and slightly wider than the GX and therefore the GX was considered smaller. All GX production has occurred at the Tahara plant in Japan, alongside the Land Cruiser Prado and the export-minded Toyota 4Runner.

Some countries classify the GX as a full-size vehicle (e.g., Australia), while some classify it as a mid-size vehicle (e.g., US), depending on local regulations.

The name “GX” stands for “Grand Crossover”. Unlike crossover SUVs, the GX has body-on-frame construction and "Crossover" stands for it being in the middle of the range.

== First generation (J120; 2002) ==
First generation
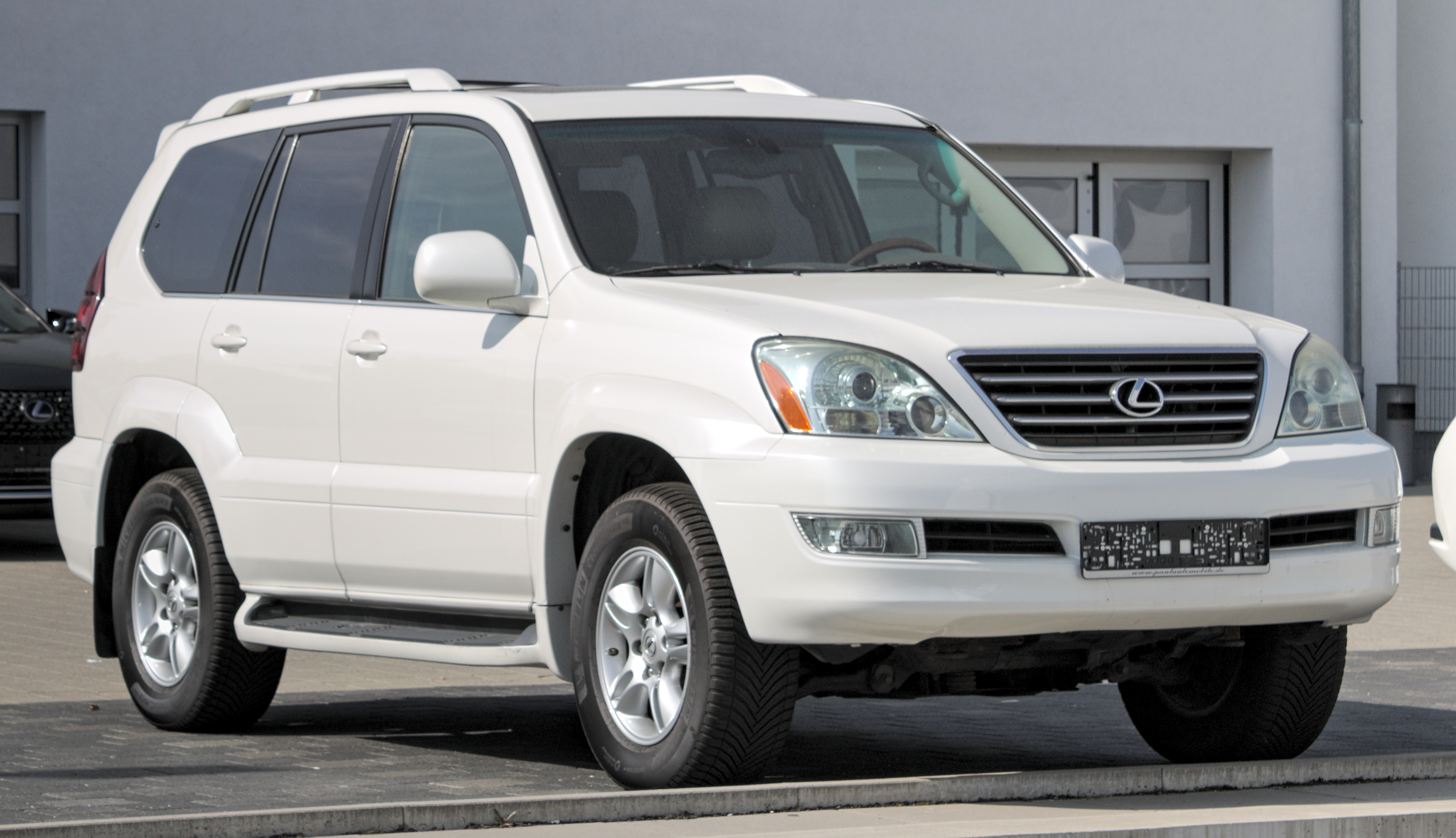
- 2007 Lexus GX 470 (UZJ120)

Overview
- Model code: J120
- Also called: Toyota Land Cruiser Prado (J120)
- Production: 2002 – July 2009
- Model years: 2003–2009
- Designer: Shoichi Fujiyoshi (2000)

Body and chassis
- Platform: Toyota F2
- Related: Toyota 4Runner (N210)

Powertrain
- Engine: Gasoline: 4.7 L 2UZ-FE V8 (GX 470, UZJ120)
- Transmission: 5-speed A750F automatic

Dimensions
- Wheelbase: 2,789 mm (109.8 in)
- Length: 4,780 mm (188.2 in)
- Width: 1,880 mm (74.0 in)
- Height: 1,895 mm (74.6 in)
- Curb weight: 2,209 kg (4,871 lb)

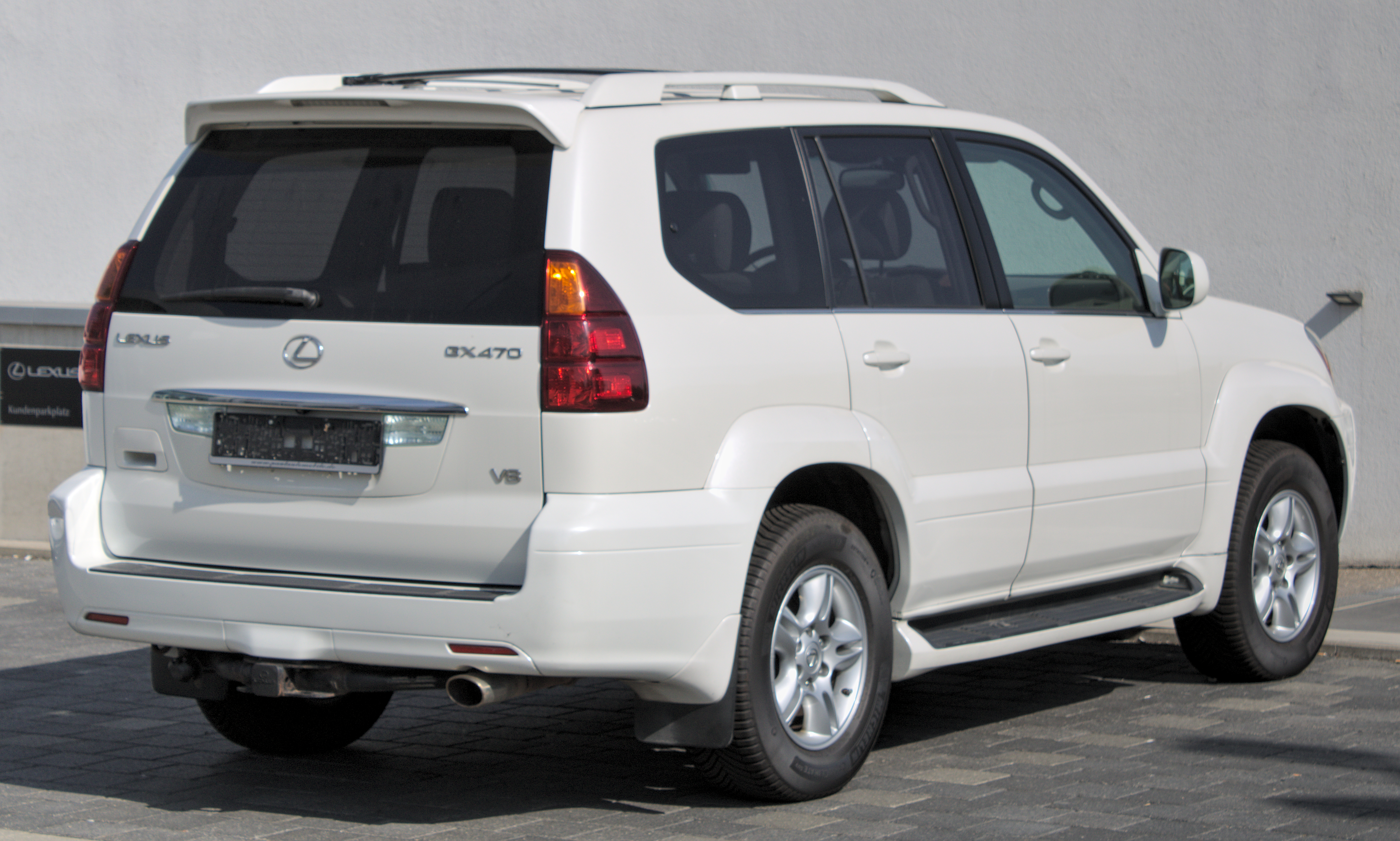
Rear view (UZJ120)

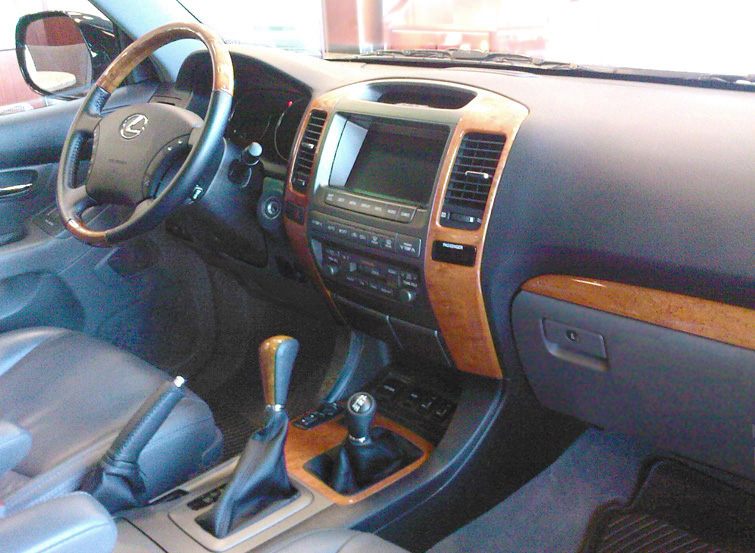
Interior (UZJ120)

Lexus introduced the GX 470 at the North American International Auto Show in January 2002 as a 2003 model, with sales commencing in November 2002. The GX development program began in 1999 following the J120 Toyota Land Cruiser Prado in 1997, with design work by Shoichi Fujiyoshi concluding in the first half of 2000. The suspension shared its layout with the Toyota 4Runner equipped with the rear air suspension, while adding Adaptive Variable Suspension (AVS) and Downhill Assist Control (DAC). AVS could adjust damper firmness continuously while DAC modulated descents down slopes. Power came from a 4.7-liter, 32-valve, four-cam 2UZ-FE V8 engine originally rated at 175 kW (235 hp) at 4,800 rpm and 434 N⋅m (320 lb⋅ft) of torque at 3,400 rpm. Towing capacity was rated at 2,300 kg (5,000 lb) for the 2003 model year. Midway through the 2004 model year, the GX received an upgraded towing capacity of 2,900 kg (6,500 lb) with the addition of a much stronger frame-bolted tubular hitch. Ground clearance measured 211 mm (8.3 in), with an approach angle of 30° and a departure angle of 29° raised (25° normal). The GX 470 carried a drag coefficient of Cd=0.38.

The interior came equipped with two rows of seating, while an optional third row allowed up to eight passengers to be carried. However, the folding third row was tight with only 630 mm (24.9 in) of legroom. A Mark Levinson audio system along with a Rear Seat Entertainment System were available as options. A side-opening rear tailgate was standard.

In 2003, for the 2004 model year, the GX 470's transmission was upgraded to a sealed unit with no dipstick. An optional Kinetic Dynamic Suspension System (KDSS) became available as a late-year addition. KDSS freed and adjusted the vehicle's stabilizer bars for greater articulation allowing the wheels to move with less restriction over uneven terrain, and used front and rear hydraulic pressure-sensing valves and larger stabilizer bars to reduce body roll during on-road conditions. Safety upgrades for 2004 included a roll-sensing feature for the side curtain airbags, a tire pressure monitoring system, and an optional rear backup camera system.

In 2004, for the 2005 model year, the GX 470's engine gained 26 kW (35 hp) with the addition of VVT-i for a total of 201 kW (270 hp). This allowed the SUV to be certified as an Ultra-Low Emission Vehicle II (ULEV II) in the U.S. Other upgrades included an enhanced navigation system, Bluetooth compatibility, and more voice commands. A Sport model joined the lineup, including the Kinetic Dynamic Suspension System and different styling such as smoked bezel headlamps, added chrome trim, and black birdseye maple wood.

In 2005, for the 2006 model year, changes in SAE engine testing procedures resulted in a slight drop in the amount of stated power for the V8 to 196 kW (263 hp), and Lexus Link telematics was offered in North America. For 2007, the GX 470 was largely unchanged, with upgrades for cabin electronics including a new generation navigation system, auxiliary input jack for devices like an iPod, DVD video playback when parked, and larger optional rear entertainment video screen.

Finally, in 2007, for the 2008 model year, the GX 470 received styling updates, including a dark metallic grille, liquid graphite wheels, added exterior and interior chrome, revised turn signal lights, and added wood and body color options.

The Lexus GX has won various awards including "Four Wheeler of the Year" in 2003 and 2004 from Four Wheeler Magazine, and Automobile Magazine All-Star for 2003 in the Mid-Size Sport-Utility category. J.D. Power and Associates named the GX 470 the highest ranked premium luxury SUV in initial quality in 2005, and Kelley Blue Book gave the GX 470 its Best Resale Value Award in 2006.

== Second generation (J150; 2009) ==
Second generation
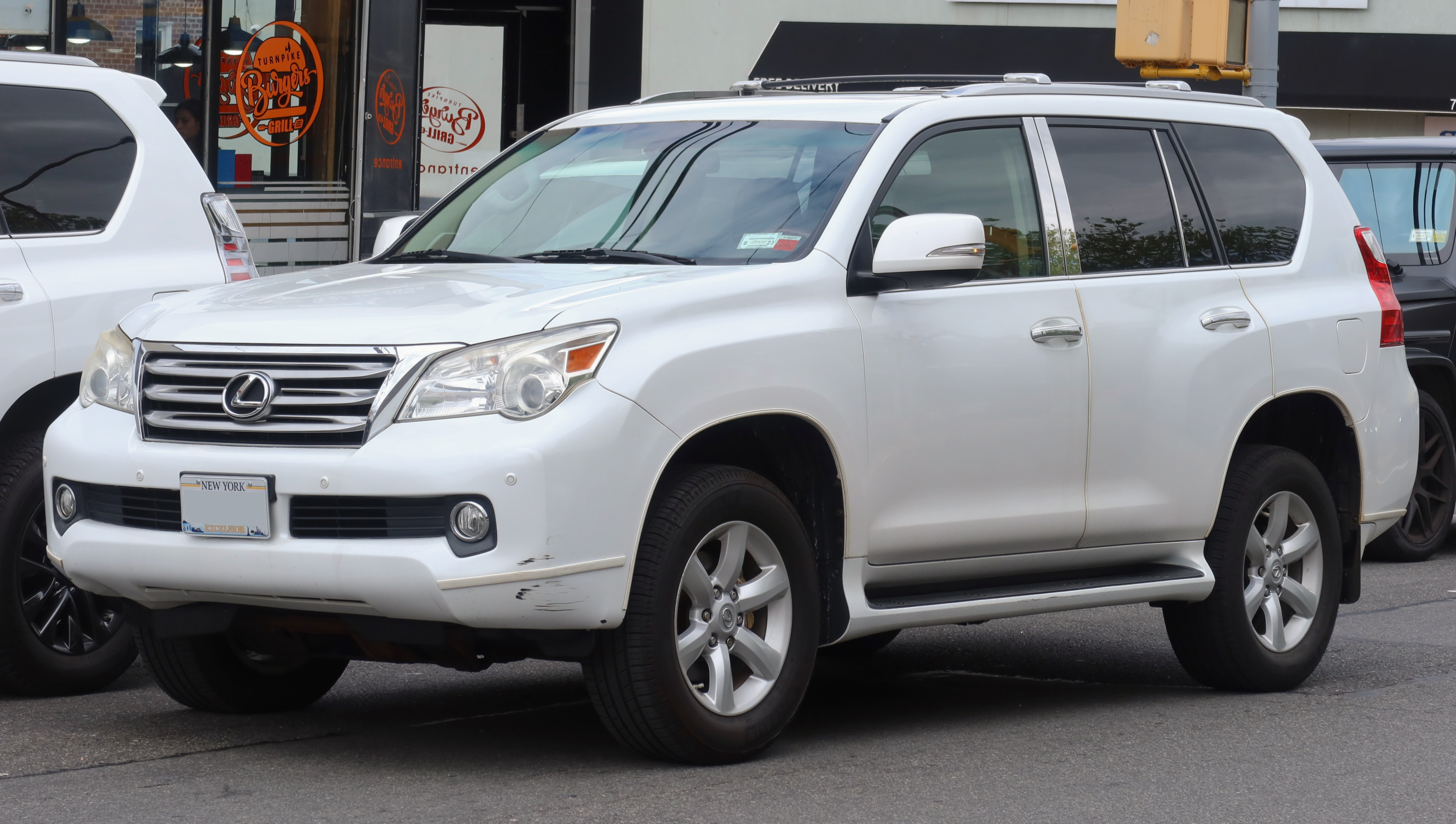
- 2010 Lexus GX 460 (URJ150; pre-facelift, US)

Overview
- Model code: J150
- Also called: Toyota Land Cruiser Prado (J150)
- Production: November 2009 – November 2023
- Model years: 2010–2023
- Designer: Yuji Fujiwara (2007); Atsuichi Suga (facelift: 2011)

Body and chassis
- Platform: Toyota F2
- Related: Toyota 4Runner (N280)

Powertrain
- Engine: Gasoline: 4.0 L 1GR-FE V6 (GX 400, GRJ150, China); 4.6 L 1UR-FE V8 (GX 460, URJ150)
- Transmission: 6-speed A760F automatic

Dimensions
- Wheelbase: 2,790 mm (109.8 in)
- Length: 4,880 mm (192.1 in)
- Width: 1,885 mm (74.2 in)
- Height: 1,830–1,885 mm (72.0–74.2 in)
- Curb weight: 2,370–2,452 kg (5,225–5,406 lb)

The GX 460 debuted in China at the Guangzhou International Automobile Exhibition in November 2009. The redesigned model continued with body-on-frame construction, full-time four-wheel drive, an electronically controlled hi-lo transfer case, and a Torsen center locking differential. The Kinetic Dynamic Suspension System (KDSS) became standard. Power came from a new 4.6-liter 1UR-FE V8 engine producing 224 kW (301 hp) and 446 N⋅m (329 lb⋅ft) of torque, mated to a new six-speed automatic transmission. Fuel economy was improved over the prior generation, while maximum towing capacity was 2,950 kg (6,500 lb). The drag coefficient was reduced to Cd=0.35. The rear wiper was hidden under the rear spoiler, and while the tailgate remained side-opening, a flip-up glass panel was added.

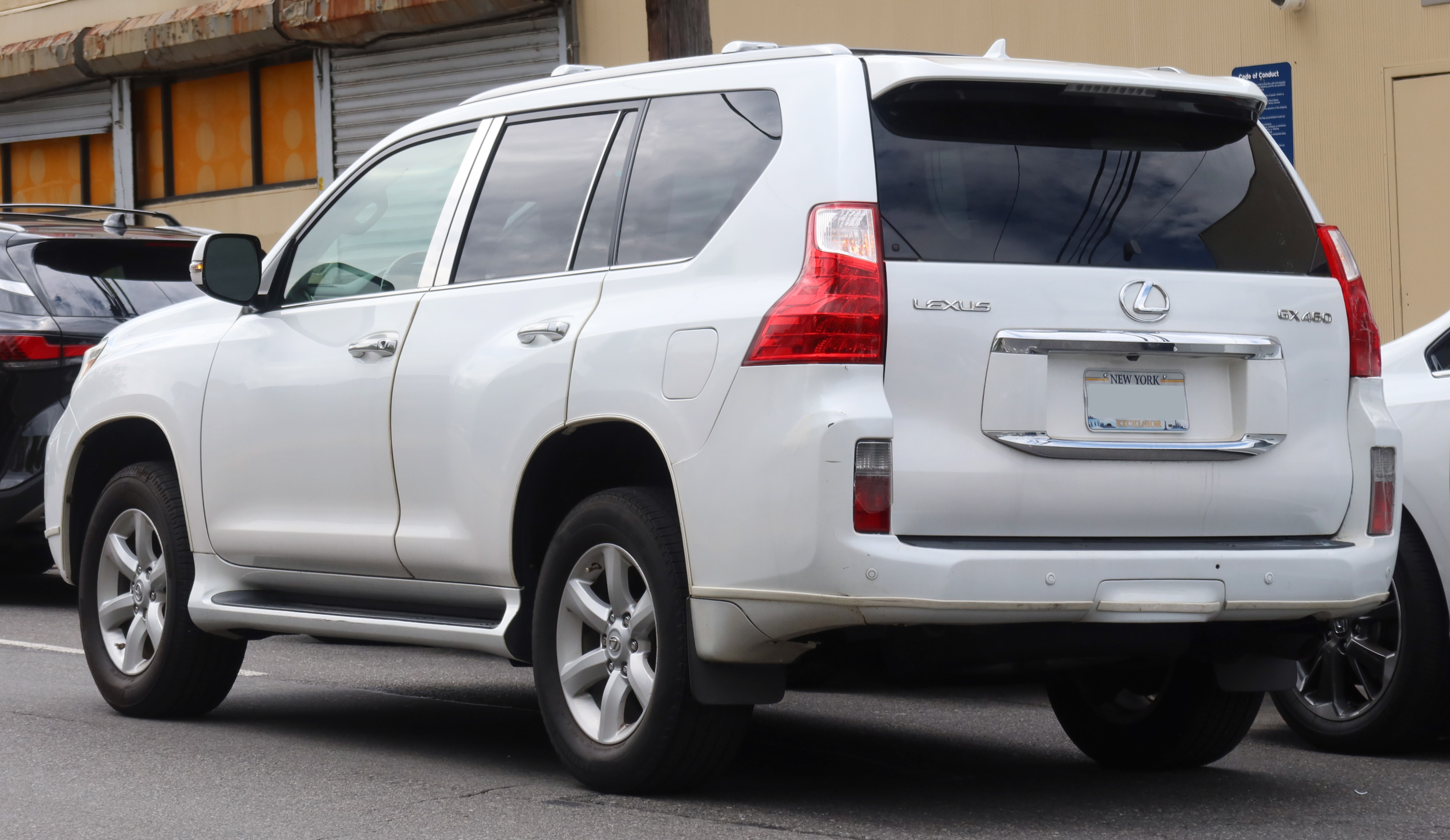
Rear (pre-facelift)

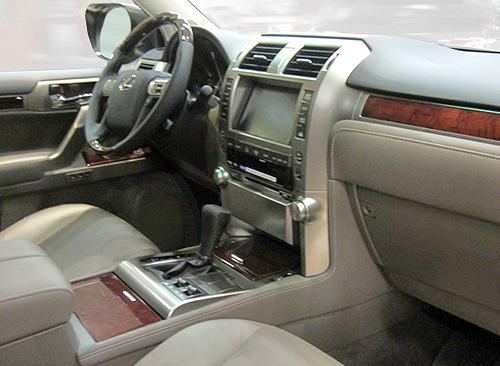
Interior (pre-facelift)

The interior added a power-folding, two-passenger third row which folded flat, allowing capacity for up to seven passengers, with the second row sliding or tilting for third-row access. Because the third row was no longer removable and used additional space, cargo capacity declined. A toggle switch replaced the transfer case's floor-mounted shift lever, and the gauge cluster added a steering wheel angle display for off-road situations. Similar to before, a Mark Levinson sound system and two-display Rear Seat Entertainment System (RSES) were optional, while three-zone climate control, semi-aniline leather, and heated second-row seats and steering wheel were new options.

Like its predecessor, Rear Adjustable Height Control (AHC) air suspension was offered on the GX 460 with an Adaptive Variable Suspension (AVS) system and Hill-start Assist Control (HAC). Additional electronic aids included the LX 570's Crawl Control system, Downhill Assist Control (DAC), and Active Traction Control (A-TRAC). The Torsen differential distributed a variable torque split when left unlocked, including a 40:60 (front: rear) ratio under normal driving conditions, a 30:70 ratio during cornering, and a 50:50 ratio when rear-wheel slippage was detected.

Added safety features included whiplash-reducing active headrests and ten airbags, including front knee airbags and rear side torso airbags. New safety options include a Pre-Collision System, Driver Monitoring System, lane departure warning system, and Lexus Enform with Safety Connect telematics. Optional cameras located at the rear door, rear-view mirror, and passenger-side mirror provided views of the vehicle's sides. Low-beam HID headlamp projectors were offered with an Intelligent High Beam feature which automatically dimmed the high beams depending on traffic conditions and an Adaptive Front lighting System (AFS) that swiveled the headlamps in corners.

On May 28, 2012, Lexus China announced the market launch of the GX 400, which replaces the GX 460 in China. The engine option is now changed to the 4.0-liter 1GR-FE V6 engine that outputs 202 kW (271 hp) combined with a five-speed automatic transmission. Due to the power reduction, it takes 9.8 seconds for the GX 400 to accelerate from 0 to 100 km/h (0 to 62 mph). Compared with the outgoing GX 460, most standard equipment on GX 400 remains the same. However, in November 2017, the GX 400 was discontinued in Chinese markets.

On April 13, 2010, Consumer Reports in the United States urged customers not to buy the 2010 model year GX 460, giving it a "Don't buy, Safety Risk" label, its first such vehicle rating since 2001, following the results of a "lift-off oversteer" emergency test. This label was lifted on May 7, 2010. In the high-speed test, the SUV was quickly turned with no pedal input, causing a sideways slide before the vehicle stability control (VSC) initiated a full stop. Consumer Reports said that the VSC acted too slowly, and if a wheel hit a curb or slid off the pavement, a rollover accident could occur. The shared platform Toyota 4Runner passed the test, and while Consumer Reports said it knew of no actual incidents, it recommended a software fix. The same day, vehicle maker Toyota expressed concern, thanked the magazine, and temporarily suspended GX 460 sales. While noting that the SUV met all U.S. federal requirements, on April 16 Toyota confirmed that its testing had duplicated the results.

On April 19, 2010, a voluntary recall of the GX 460 was issued, along with the left-hand-drive Land Cruiser Prado, for a software update to fix the VSC response. With the software update in place, sales resumed on April 29. Vehicle stability control had been criticized by Wheels magazine for slow response speed on such models as the Toyota Kluger (known as the Highlander in North America), while Drive noted that VSC had also been said to intervene too soon. The Wall Street Journal pointed the lack of VSC a decade ago.

In September 2013, the GX received a first facelift with the Lexus spindle grille design, new LED headlamps, and LED daytime running lights standard; LED fog lamps are optional. In the US pricing has been reduced by $4,750.

=== First facelift ===
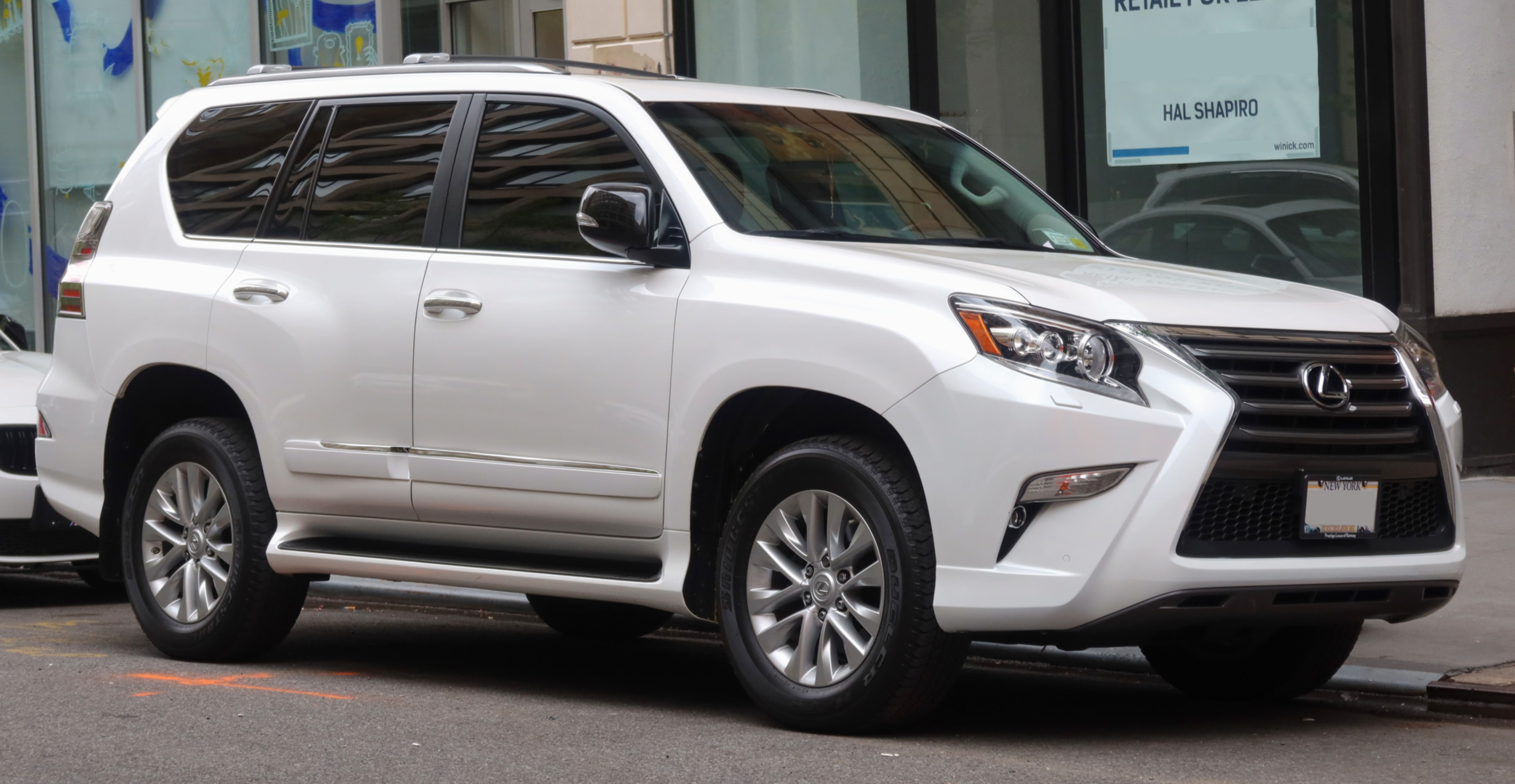
Lexus GX 460 (first facelift)

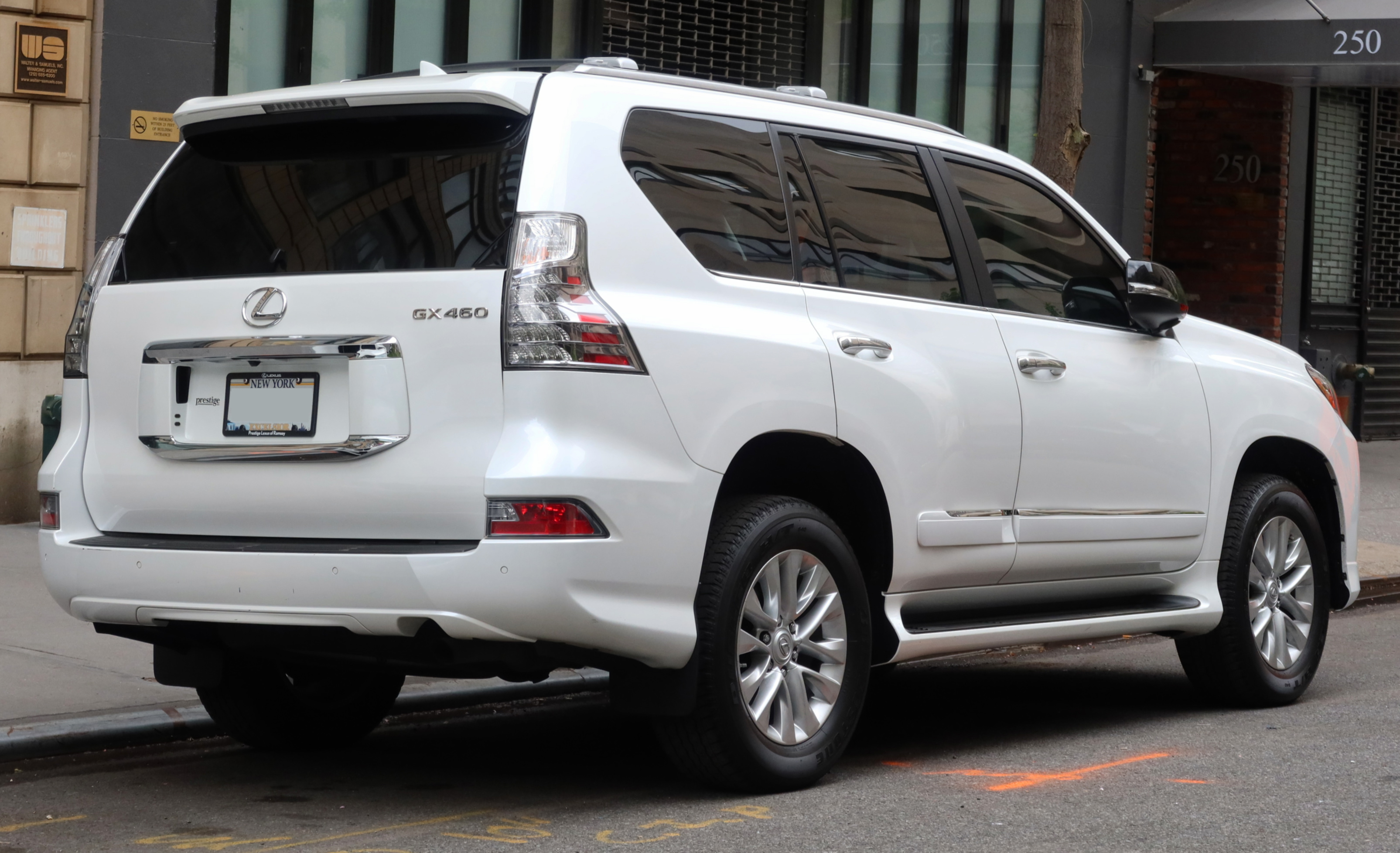
Lexus GX 460 (first facelift)

=== Second facelift ===
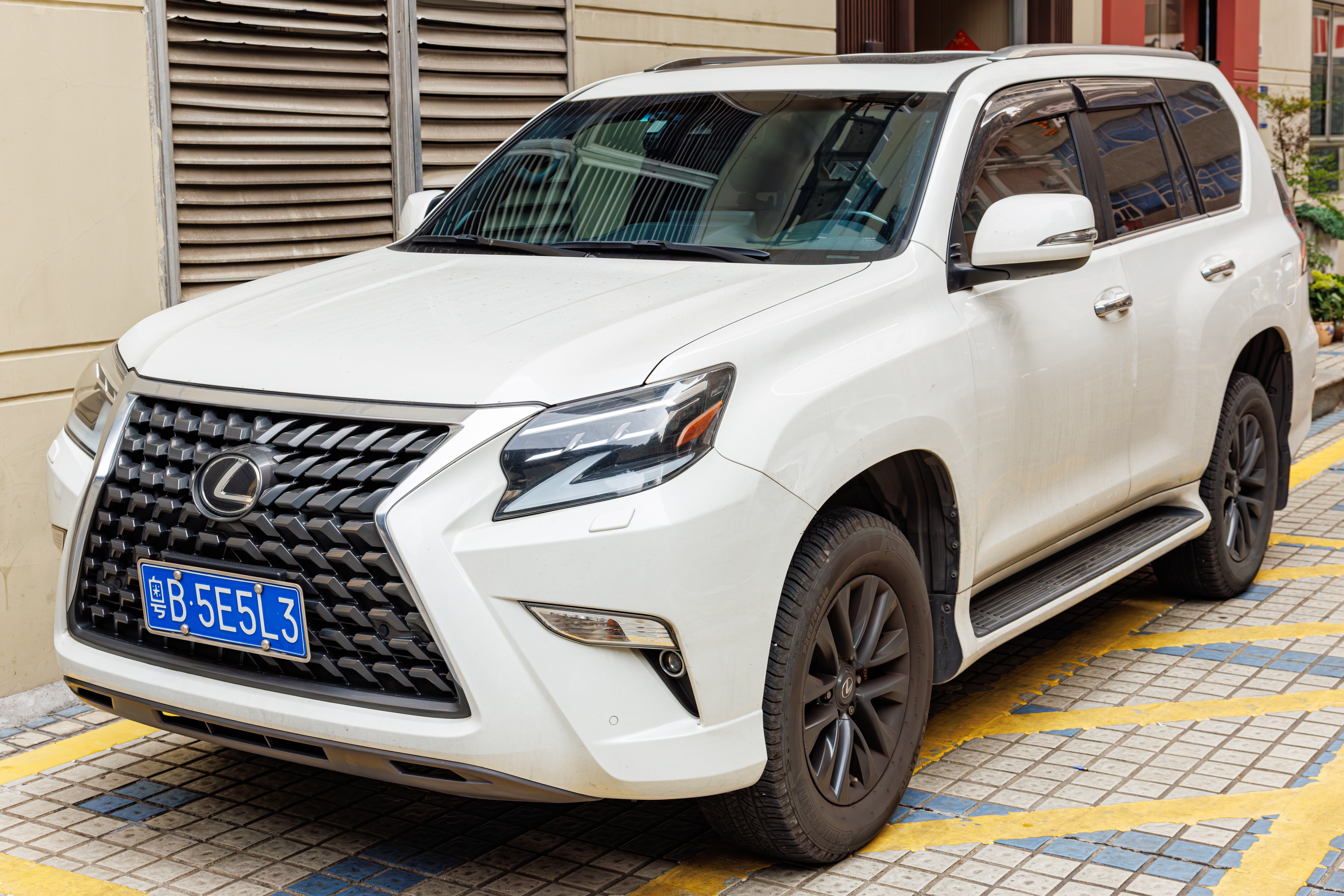
Second facelift

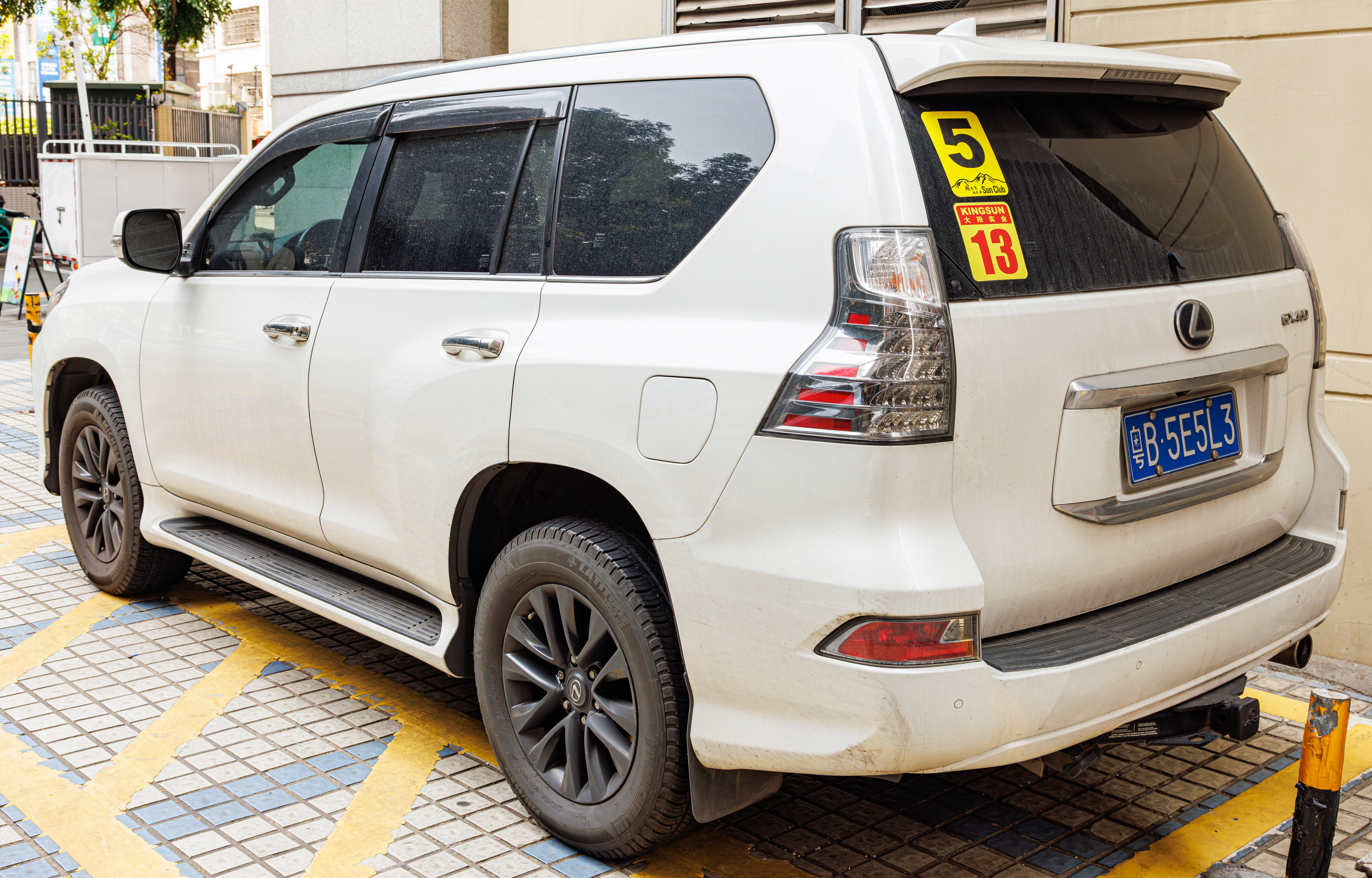
Second facelift

=== Yearly changes ===
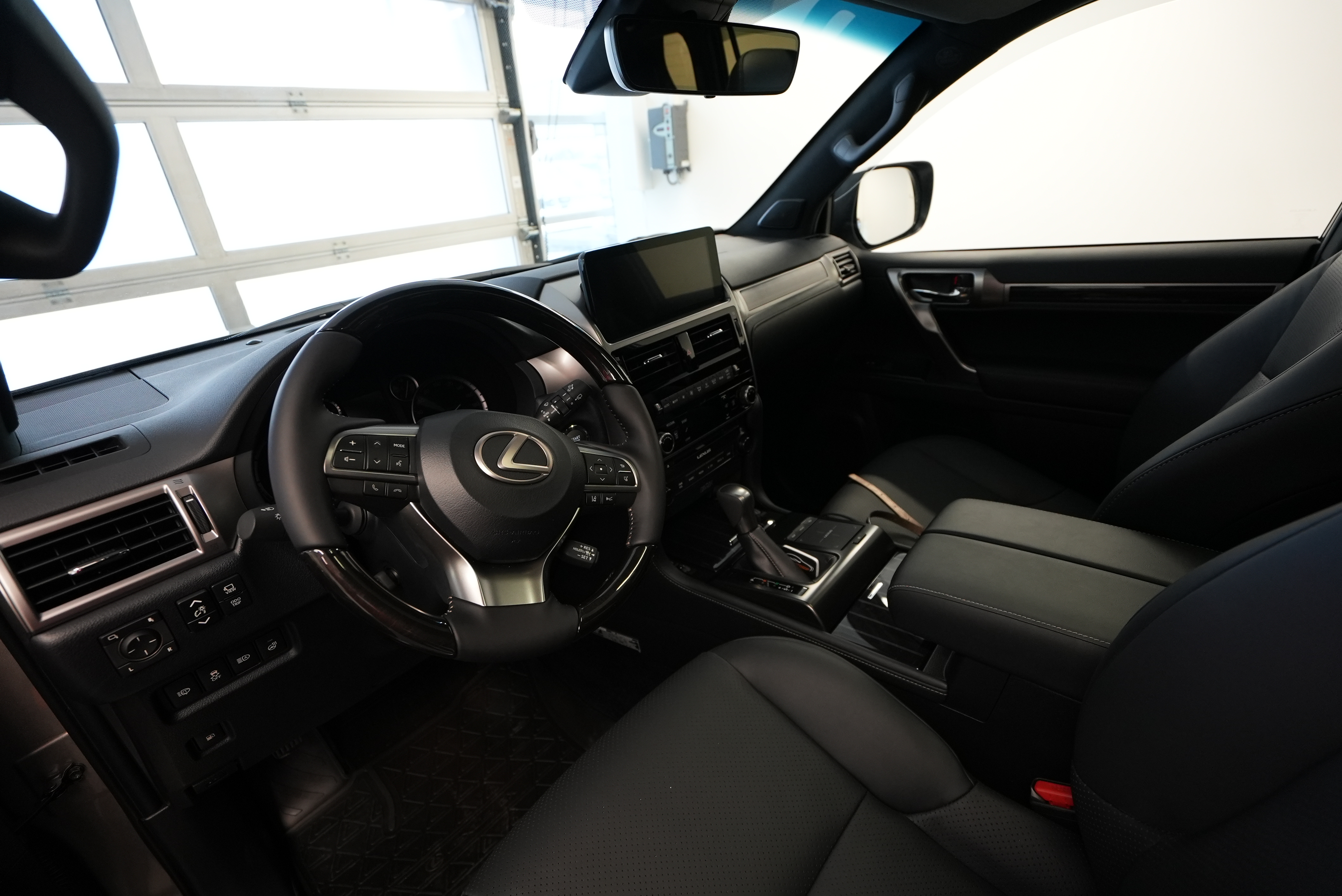
Second facelift interior

- 2013, for the 2014 model year: Facelift with the spindle grille design, new LED headlamps, and LED daytime running lights; LED fog lamps are optional. In the US the price was reduced by $4,750.
- 2016, for the 2017 model year: the Lexus GX added second-row captain chairs with the luxury package.
- 2019, for the 2020 model year: the GX received a second facelift with a redesigned, more angular spindle grille along with new triple-beam LED headlamps. An Off-Road package is also new, which consists of a 360-degree Panoramic View Monitor and Multi-Terrain Monitor with 4 Cameras, a transmission cooler, a fuel-tank protector along with Lexus' own Crawl Control and Multi-Terrain Select. Additionally, the interior gains new trim options, including a Rioja Red interior color, and safety features part of Safety System+ are now standard on all models.
- 2021, for the 2022 model year: the GX received some minor changes, one of which included a new infotainment system with both Apple CarPlay and Android Auto and a redesigned dashboard. The Black Line Edition cosmetic package was introduced but could not be built with specific luxury features such as the Mark Levinson audio system.
- 2022, for the 2023 model year: Eminent white pearl was introduced as a new exterior color for the GX460.

=== Engines ===
Modification	Engine	Horsepower	Max. Torque	Region	Years
GX 400	1GR-FE V6 3,956 cc (241.4 cu in)	202 kW (271 hp) at 5600 rpm	381 N⋅m (281 lb⋅ft) at 4400 rpm	China only	2012–2017
GX 460	1UR-FE V8 4,608 cc (281.2 cu in)	215–218 kW (288–292 hp) at 5500 rpm	438 N⋅m (323 lb⋅ft) at 3500 rpm	Middle East, Russia, Ukraine, Armenia, Georgia, Kazakhstan, Vietnam	2010–2023
GX 460	1UR-FE V8 4,608 cc (281.2 cu in)	224 kW (301 hp) at 5500 rpm	446 N⋅m (329 lb⋅ft) at 3500 rpm	United States, Canada, Bolivia, Costa Rica, Dominican Republic, Panama, Philippines	2010–2023

== Third generation (J250; 2023) ==
Third generation
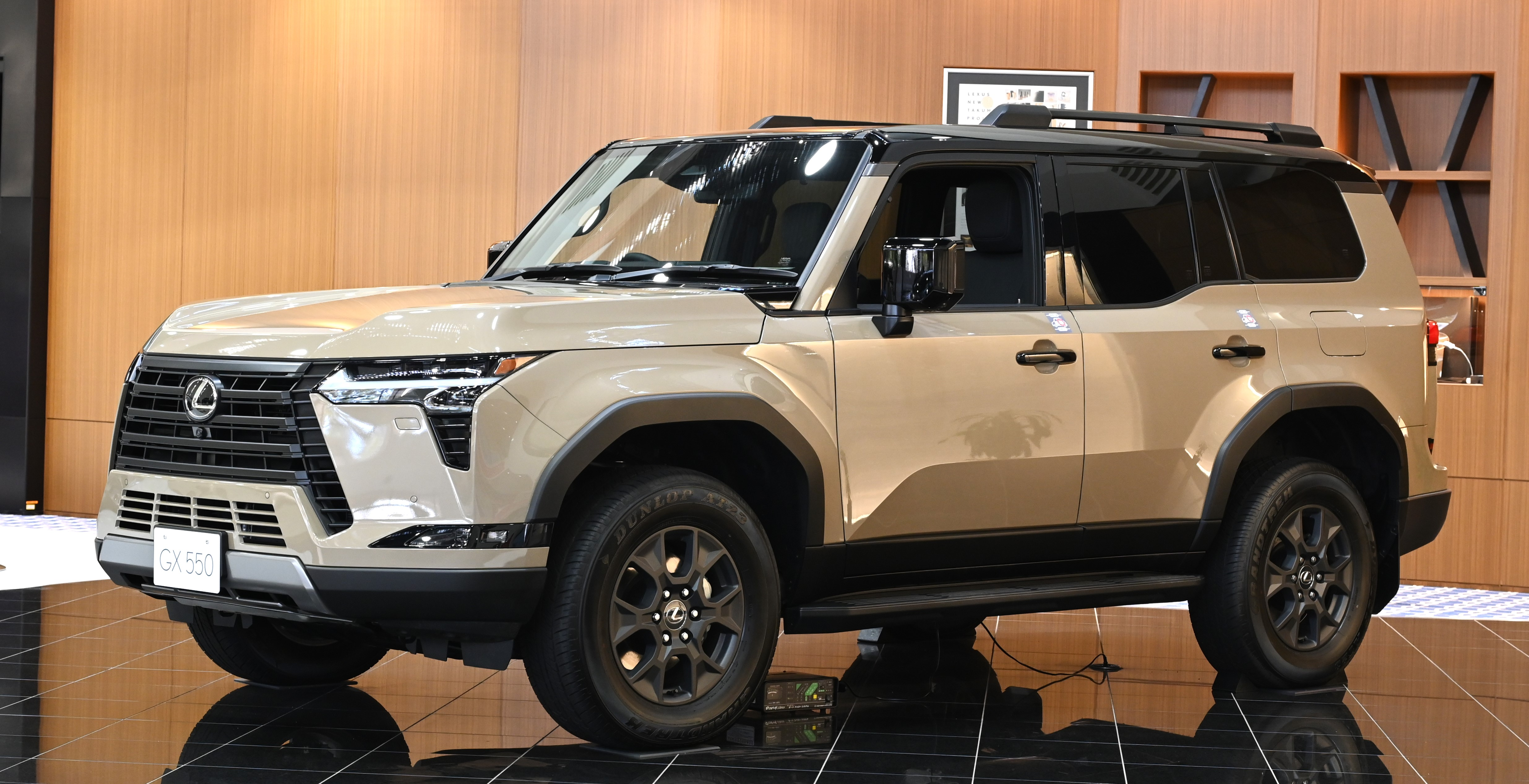
- 2024 Lexus GX 550 Overtrail+ (Japan)

Overview
- Model code: J250
- Also called: Toyota Land Cruiser Prado (J250)
- Production: November 2023 – present
- Model years: 2024–present

Body and chassis
- Platform: TNGA: GA-F
- Related: Toyota Land Cruiser (J300); Lexus LX (J310); Toyota Tacoma (N400); Toyota 4Runner (N500)

Powertrain
- Engine: Gasoline: 3.4 L V35A-FTS twin-turbo V6 (GX 550; VJA252); Gasoline hybrid: 2.4 L T24A-FTS turbo I4 (GX 550h; TJH252)
- Transmission: 8-speed automatic (2.4 L hybrid); 10-speed "Direct Shift" automatic (3.4 L)
- Hybrid drivetrain: Parallel (GX 550h)
- Battery: 1.87 kWh, 6.5 Ah, 288 V NiMH (GX 550h)

Dimensions
- Wheelbase: 2,850 mm (112.2 in)
- Length: 4,950 mm (194.9 in)
- Width: 1,980 mm (78.0 in); 2,000 mm (78.7 in) (Overtrail)
- Height: 1,865 mm (73.4 in)

The third generation GX, marketed as GX 550 and GX 550h was revealed in a prototype form on 8 June 2023, ahead of its sister model J250 Land Cruiser Prado. It has a more squared-off design than the previous generation and is built on the GA-F platform, shared with the J250 Land Cruiser Prado. This is also the first GX model to be officially sold in Mexico, Japan, and Australia. Production started in November 2023. Unlike its predecessors, the J250 Lexus GX is not sold in Europe nor in the Middle East, but the J250 Toyota Land Cruiser Prado is sold in these regions.

The third generation GX is larger than the previous generation, with its width increasing by 95 mm (3.74 in) (overtrail by 115 mm (4.52 in)), wheelbase increasing by 60 mm (2.36 in), and length increasing by 70 mm (2.75 in).

In the US, the GX 550 is available in six grades: Premium, Premium+, Luxury, Luxury+, and the newly-added Overtrail and Overtrail+ off-road oriented models. The new Overtrail grade comes with standard 33-inch All-Terrain tires and 18-inch wheels. All models feature the V35A-FTS 3.4-liter twin-turbocharged V6 which produces 260 kW (349 hp) and 649 N⋅m (479 lb⋅ft) of torque. The GX 550 has a towing capacity of up to 3,600 kg (8,000 lb). Lexus announced a hybrid powertrain is to come later. The GX 550 comes standard with Lexus Safety System+ 3.0 and Lexus Interface with 14-inch multimedia touchscreen.

In Japan, sales started on 3 April 2025 with the GX 550 in two grades: Overtrail+, and Version L. The GX got a Modellista styling kit.

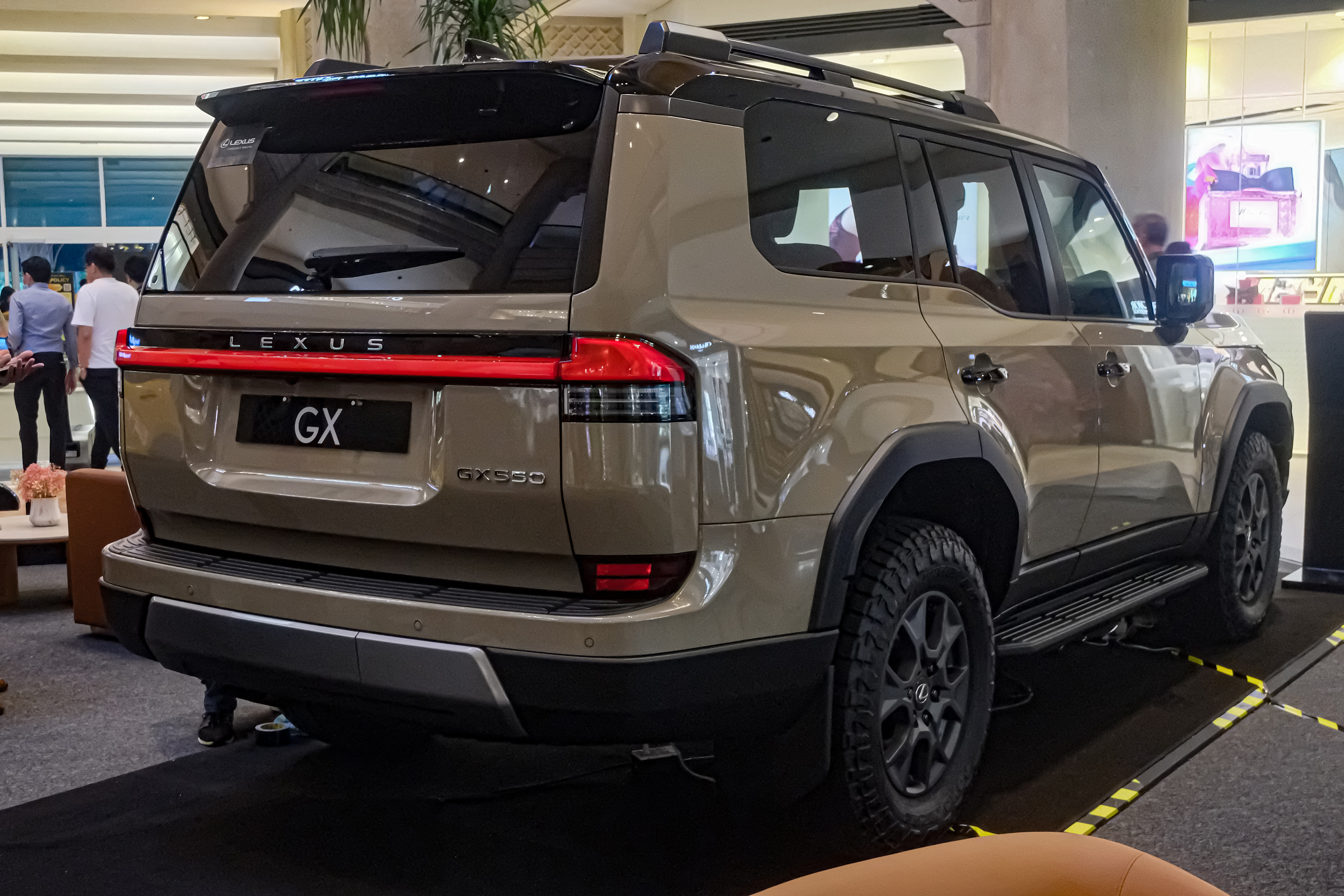
GX550 Overtrail Rear view (Philippines)

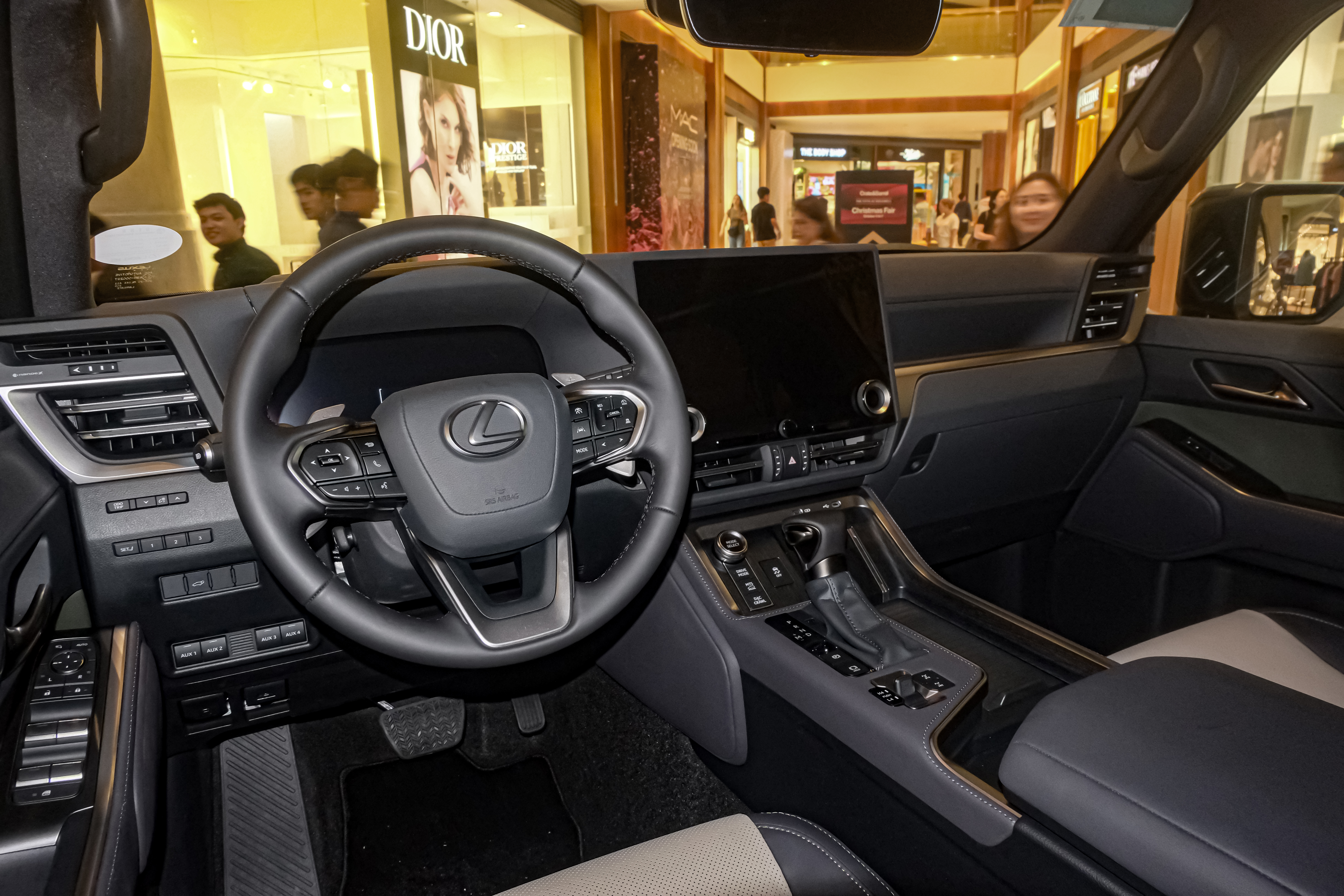
Interior (black and Chateau cream; left hand drive)

== Sales ==
Sales data for the Lexus GX are as follows, sourced from manufacturer yearly data:

Generation	Model(s)	Calendar year	Total sales (U.S.)	China
UZJ120	GX 470	2002	2,190	
UZJ120	GX 470	2003	31,376	
UZJ120	GX 470	2004	35,420	
UZJ120	GX 470	2005	34,339	
UZJ120	GX 470	2006	25,454	
UZJ120	GX 470	2007	23,035	
UZJ120	GX 470	2008	16,424	
UZJ120	GX 470	2009	6,235	
URJ150	GX 460	2010	16,450	
URJ150	GX 460	2011	11,609	
URJ150	GX 460	2012	11,039	
URJ150	GX 460	2013	12,136	
URJ150	GX 460	2014	22,685	
URJ150	GX 460	2015	25,212	
URJ150	GX 460	2016	25,148	
URJ150	GX 460	2017	27,190	
URJ150	GX 460	2018	26,724	
URJ150	GX 460	2019	25,945	
URJ150	GX 460	2020	28,519	
URJ150	GX 460	2021	32,509	
URJ150	GX 460	2022	28,519	
URJ150	GX 460	2023	31,910	861
J250	GX 550	2024	30,914	2,990
J250	GX 550	2025	37,180	3,701
