= Kinetic Dynamic Suspension System =

Suspension system

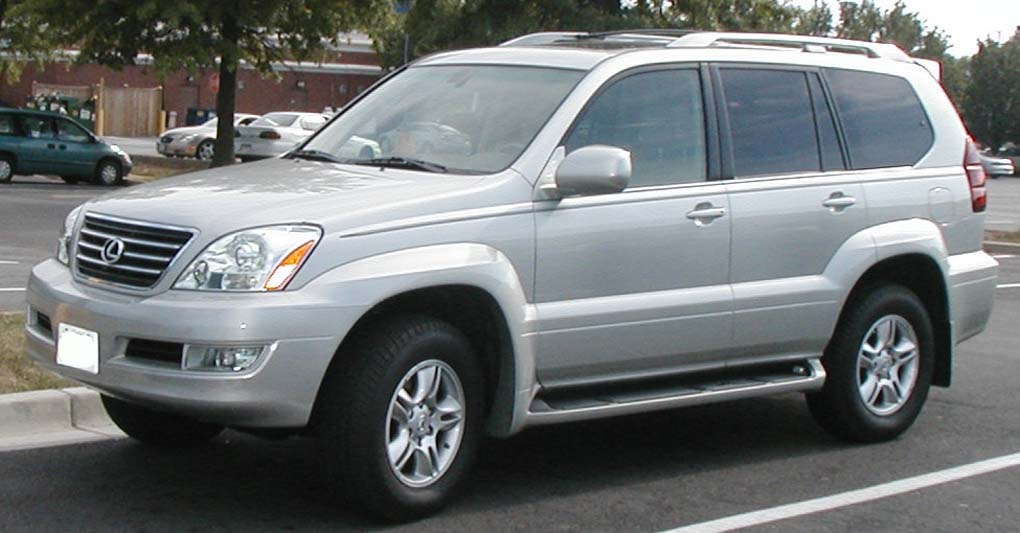
The first vehicle to feature KDSS, the Lexus GX 470

The Kinetic Dynamic Suspension System (KDSS) technology was employed initially in the Lexus GX 470, and subsequently the 200 Series Toyota Land Cruiser. The system was invented and developed by Kinetic Pty Ltd, a small R&D company based in Dunsborough, Western Australia. It optimally adjusts front and rear stabilizers based on a set of interconnected hydraulic cylinders. The interconnection is made up of hydraulic piping and a control cylinder which is located at the frame rail. KDSS, which is fully mechanical, can disengage the stabilizer bars (the bars are jointed, allowing movement independent of one another). This system will not engage during normal driving conditions, when hydraulic pressure is equal. In off-road conditions, KDSS activates when it senses that a wheel has dropped.

The Kinetic Dynamic Suspension System was first available as an option on the model year 2004 Lexus GX 470, a sport utility vehicle that was only sold in North America, and based roughly on the 120 Series Land Cruiser Prado. The system was also introduced in similar form on the 2008 Toyota Land Cruiser. For the 2008 Lexus LX 570, an electro-mechanical suspension was employed, retaining the function of the KDSS design but adding electronic components.

For the 2025 model year, KDSS became a Lexus-exclusive feature. Toyota will instead use a Stabilizer with Disconnection Mechanism (SDM), only for the front sway bar, which debuted in the 2024 Land Cruiser. This is a conventional stabilizer bar with an electronic actuator directly mounted to the bar at the front axle, activated by a button inside the cab.

== Vehicles ==
Models that have adopted the Kinetic Dynamic Suspension System to date include:

- 2010–2016 Toyota 4Runner Trail Edition
- 2017–2024 Toyota 4Runner TRD Off-Road
- 2008–present Toyota Land Cruiser
- 2004–present Lexus GX
- 2010–2023 Toyota Prado

== See also ==
- Toyota TEMS
- Citroën Hydractive
