= Toyota Modellista International =

Car tuning company based in Toyota

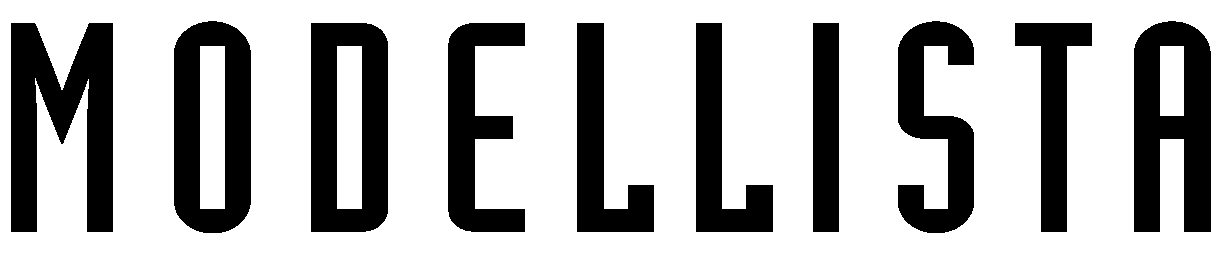
- Native name: モデリスタ
- Romanized name: Moderisuta
- Type: Private
- Industry: Automotive
- Founded: April 3, 1997; 29 years ago
- Headquarters: Chōfu , Tokyo, Japan
- Key people: Yutaka Inozawa (CEO)
- Products: Car modification
- Number of employees: 140 (as November 2017)
- Parent: Toyota Customizing & Development
- Website: www.modellista.co.jp/en/

Toyota Modellista International is a company within the Toyota Group . Its abbreviation within the Toyota Group is "TMI," and its common name outside the group is "Modellista."

== History ==
=== Early history ===
In February 1997, Toyota Modellista International Co., Ltd. was established as a joint venture between Toyota Motor Corporation and Toyota Technocraft to "engineer a business in the customization field, realizing various customer requests for standard commercially available vehicles." MODELLISTA began when Toyota Modellista International began selling customized cars and customization parts planned, developed, and sold under the MODELLISTA brand.

In the early 1990s, Yutaka Inozawa (then of Toyota Motor Corporation's Marketing Development Department) was exploring the development of a new store format. Recreational vehicles accounted for roughly half of all car sales in the United States at the time, and Inozawa was inspired to "launch a store that specialized in specialty goods and recreational vehicles." At the concept stage, MODELLISTA was planned to be established as a recreational vehicle store. In its early days, Modellista produced fully modified cars such as the Modellista PX-01, Granvia PX-02, Land Cruiser 70 "Neo Classic" PX-10, and Starlet PX-11.

This modified car business lasted for four years and during that period there were a number of Modellista works such as the PX12 Napoli (1998), Land Cruiser Prado Fishing Cruiser (1998), Altezza Qualitat (1999), Caserta (2000), and bB Street Billet.

The Modellista project was jointly developed with famous Italian coachbuilder Zagato. Zagato's collaboration continued through the release of the VM180 Zagato in 2001 and the Harrier Zagato based on first- and second generation Harrier.

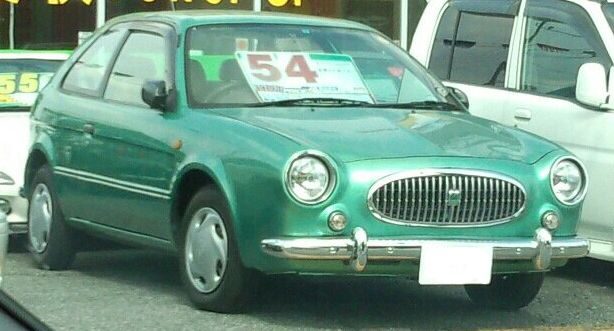
Modellista PX-12 Napoli based of Toyota Corolla II

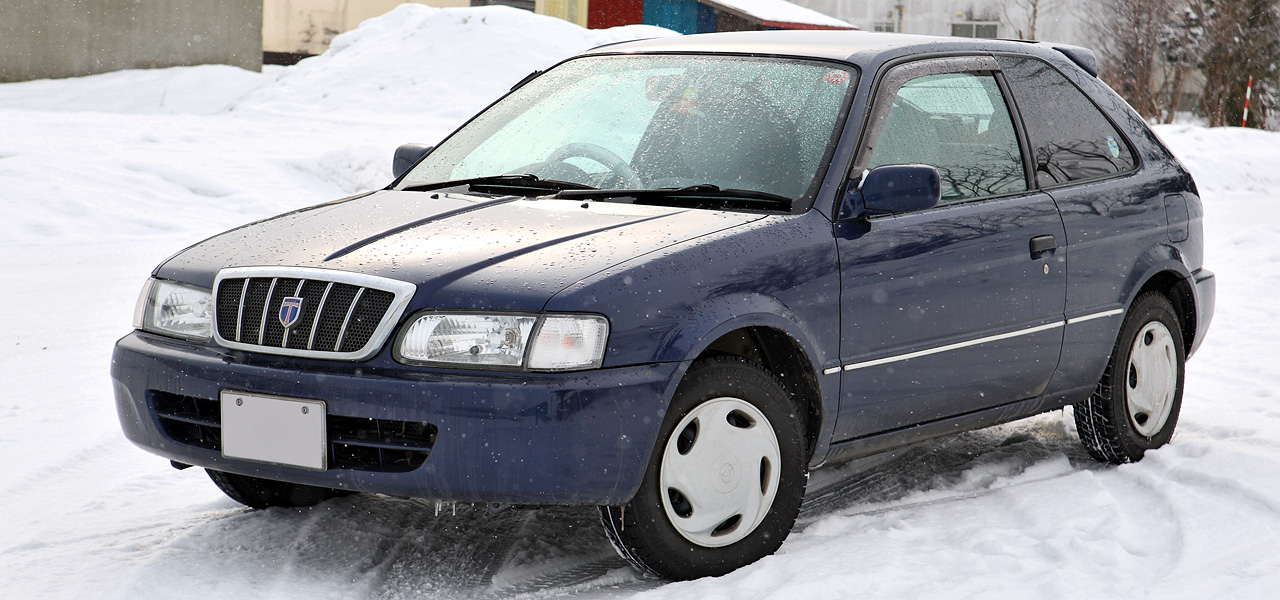
Modellista Teresa based of Toyota Corsa

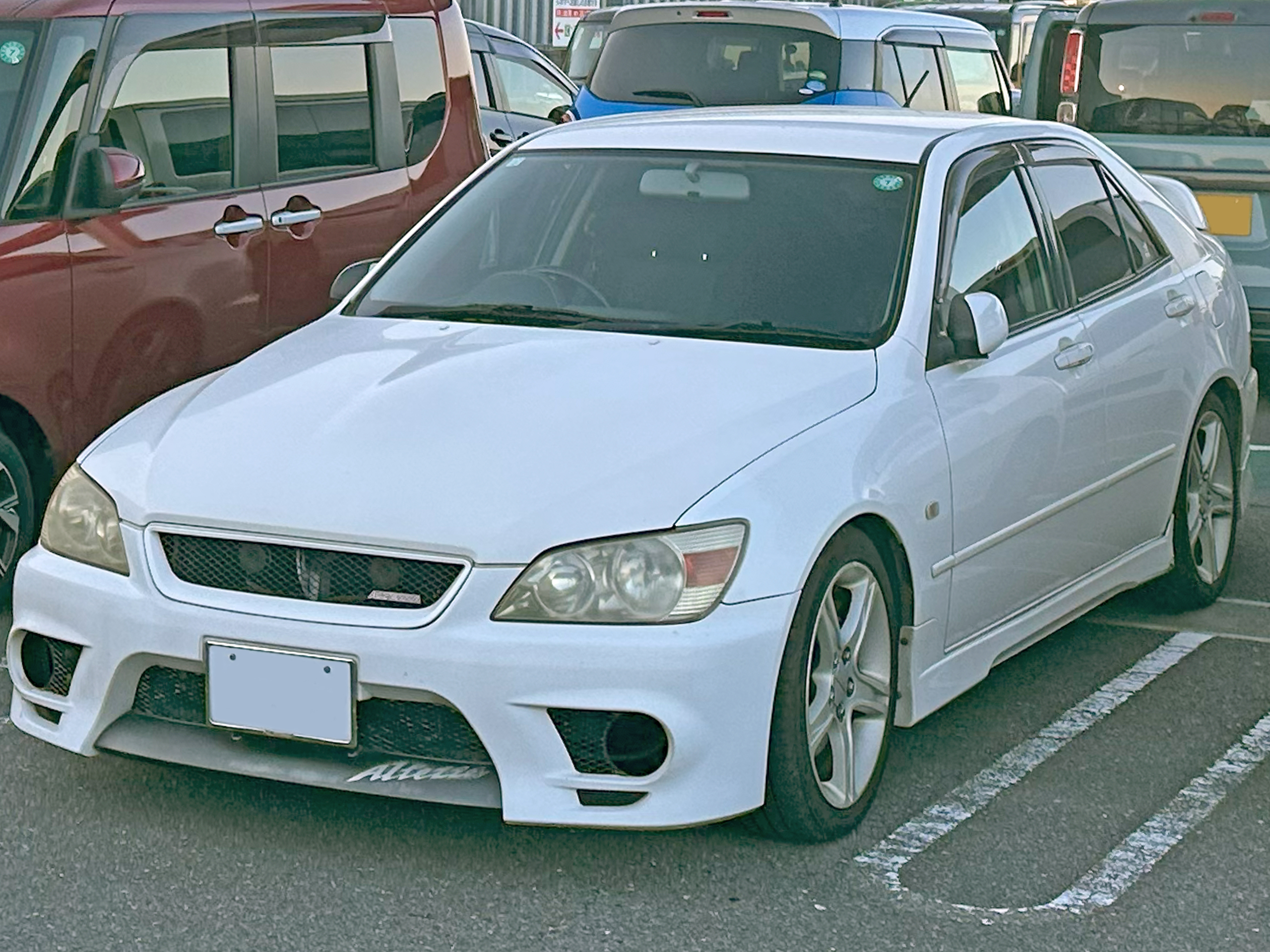
Modellista Qualitat based on Toyota Altezza

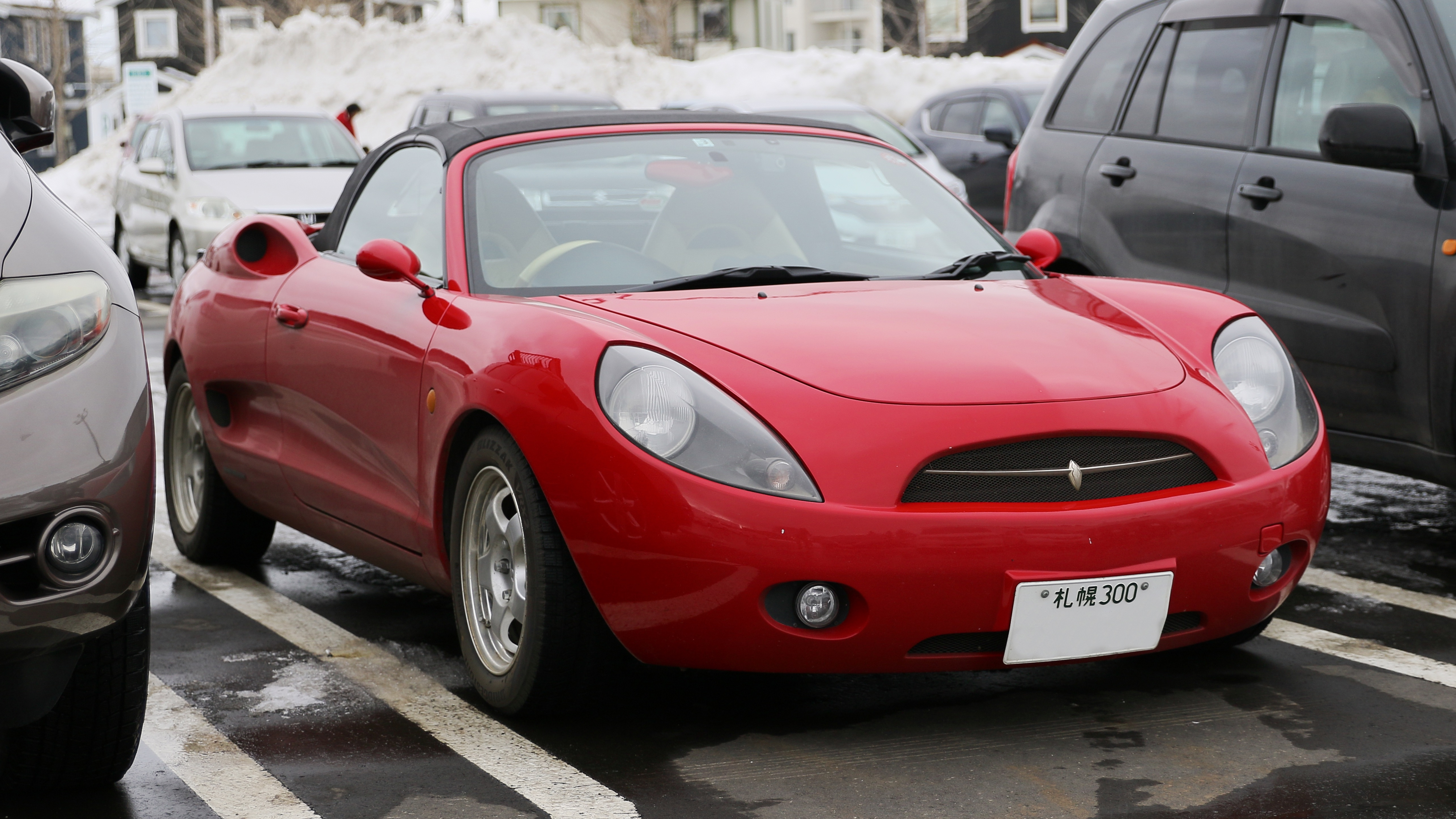
Caserta based on MR-S

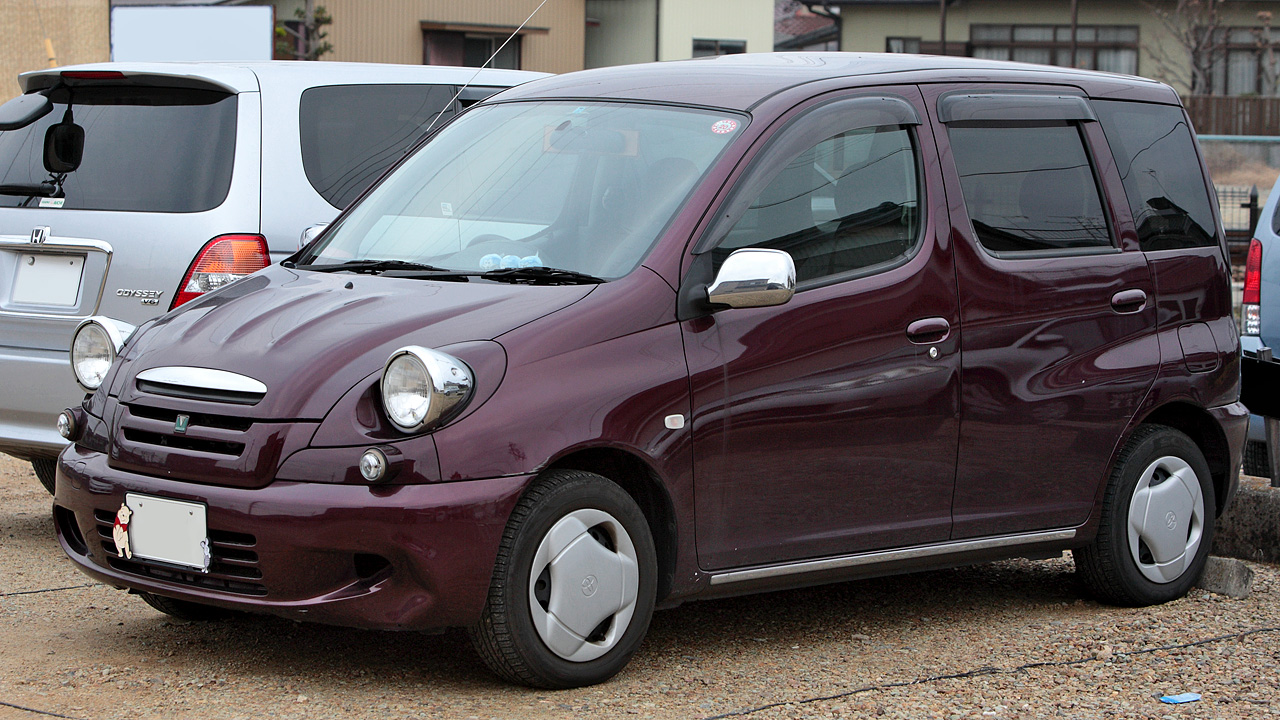
VF-130 based of Toyota FunCargo

=== Modellista parts customization ===
In addition to selling complete cars, the company began offering parts customization. It launched parts using in-house designs and aftermarket brands, laying the foundation for the customization market with aero parts, aluminum wheel and tire sets, mufflers, and other items that remain standard items to this day. Toyota Noah is first Modellista parts. The huge success of the Alphard, Vellfire, and Prius led to an increase in the desire to "drive a car that is different from others," and the need for customization expanded. The Prius was an unprecedented hit, with six versions of aero parts eventually being sold.

On 1 April 2018, Toyota Modellista International Co., Ltd. merged with Toyota Technocraft Co., Ltd. and J-TAX Co., Ltd. to become Toyota Customizing & Development Co., Ltd. Although Modellista be transferred to the new company, its stance will remain the same as before, and continue to this day as a customization division.

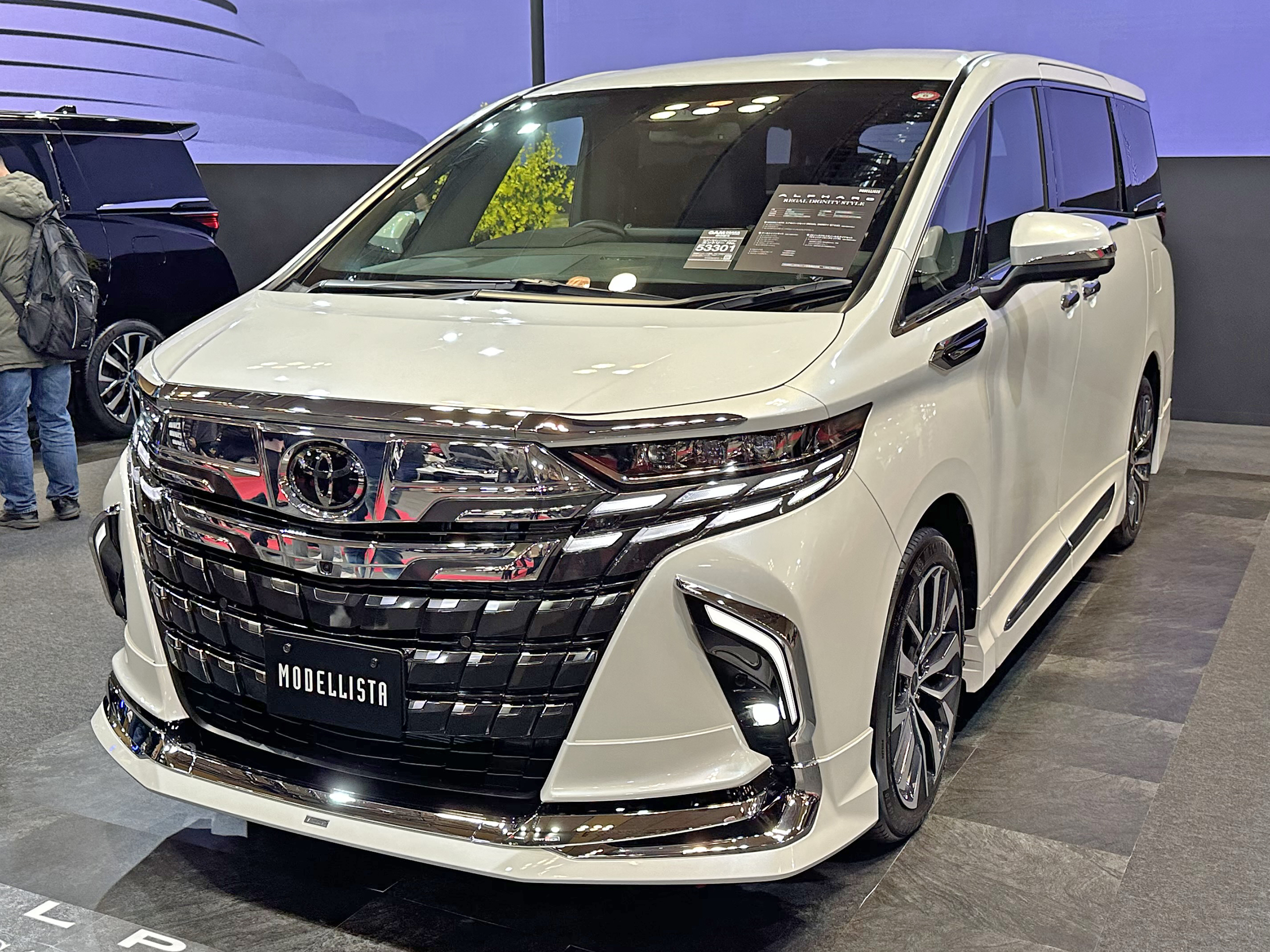
Alphard Modellista Regal Dignity Style

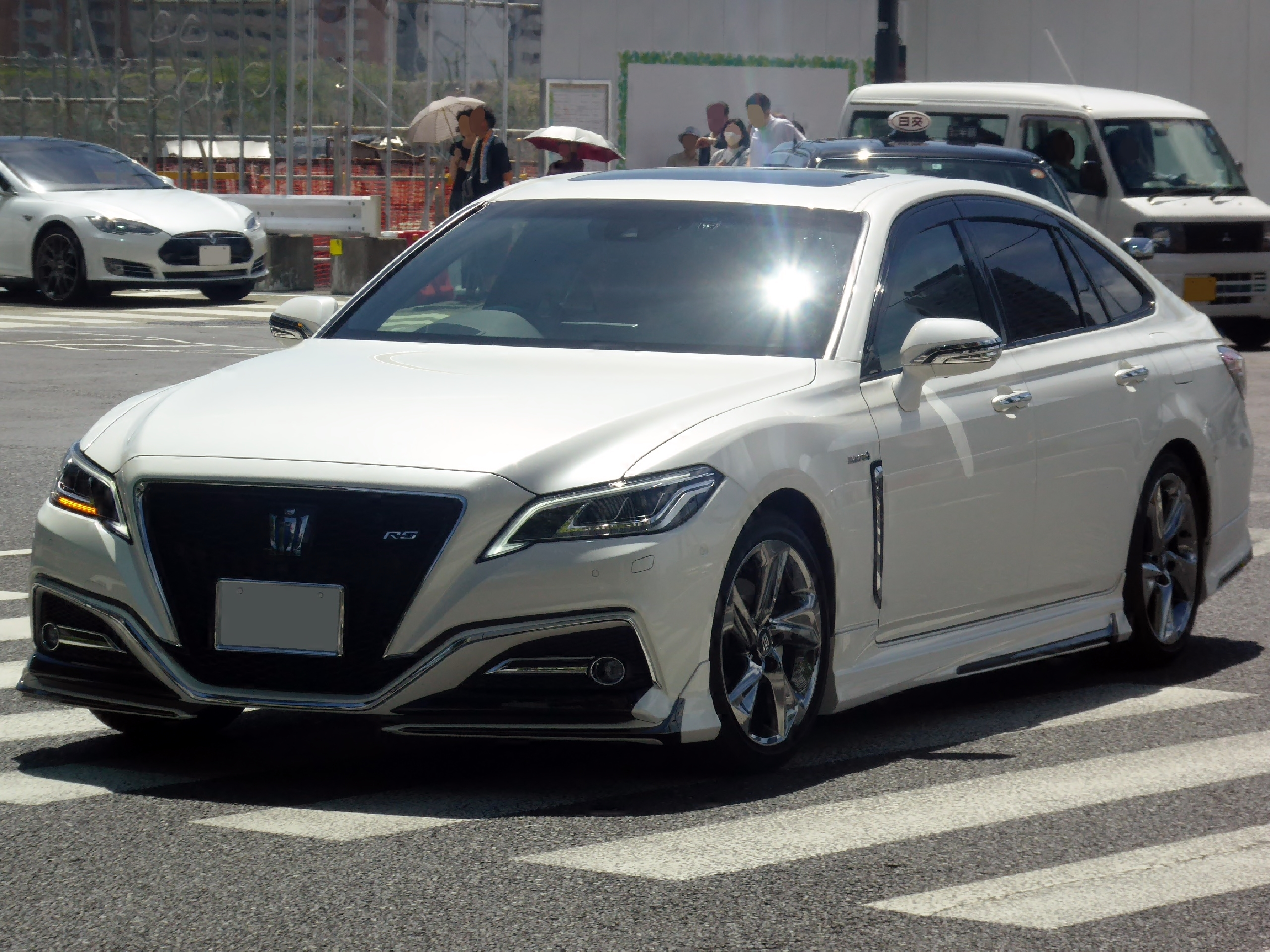
Toyota Crown (S220) with Modellista kit

=== International expansion ===
Modellista has begun full-scale global expansion. To providing parts exclusively for overseas markets and for cars produced overseas, Modellista have begun developing a brand that is tailored to lifestyles.

Modellista start overseas sales in 2021 in Thailand markets Toyota Corolla Cross and Toyota Fortuner. Designed in Japan with the collaboration of Thailand-based TCD Asia. In Indonesia, Modellista accessories package is also offered as an option for the Kijang Innova Zenix V hybrid and Q trims and Toyota Veloz Hybrid. In US, Modellista’s introduce its U.S. expansion at 2023 SEMA represents a significant milestone for the tuning brand as it marks its first official appearance at a major automotive event outside of Asia. During the event, the tuner will present three models: the Toyota Crown crossover, Lexus RX, and Lexus LX. In Russia and Middle East markets, Modellista accessories package is also offered as an option for the Toyota Land Cruiser J300

Modellista collaborated with Toyota Marine on the design of the sports utility cruiser PONAM-31 Z Grade. In 2022 Modellista was collaborated with Seiko

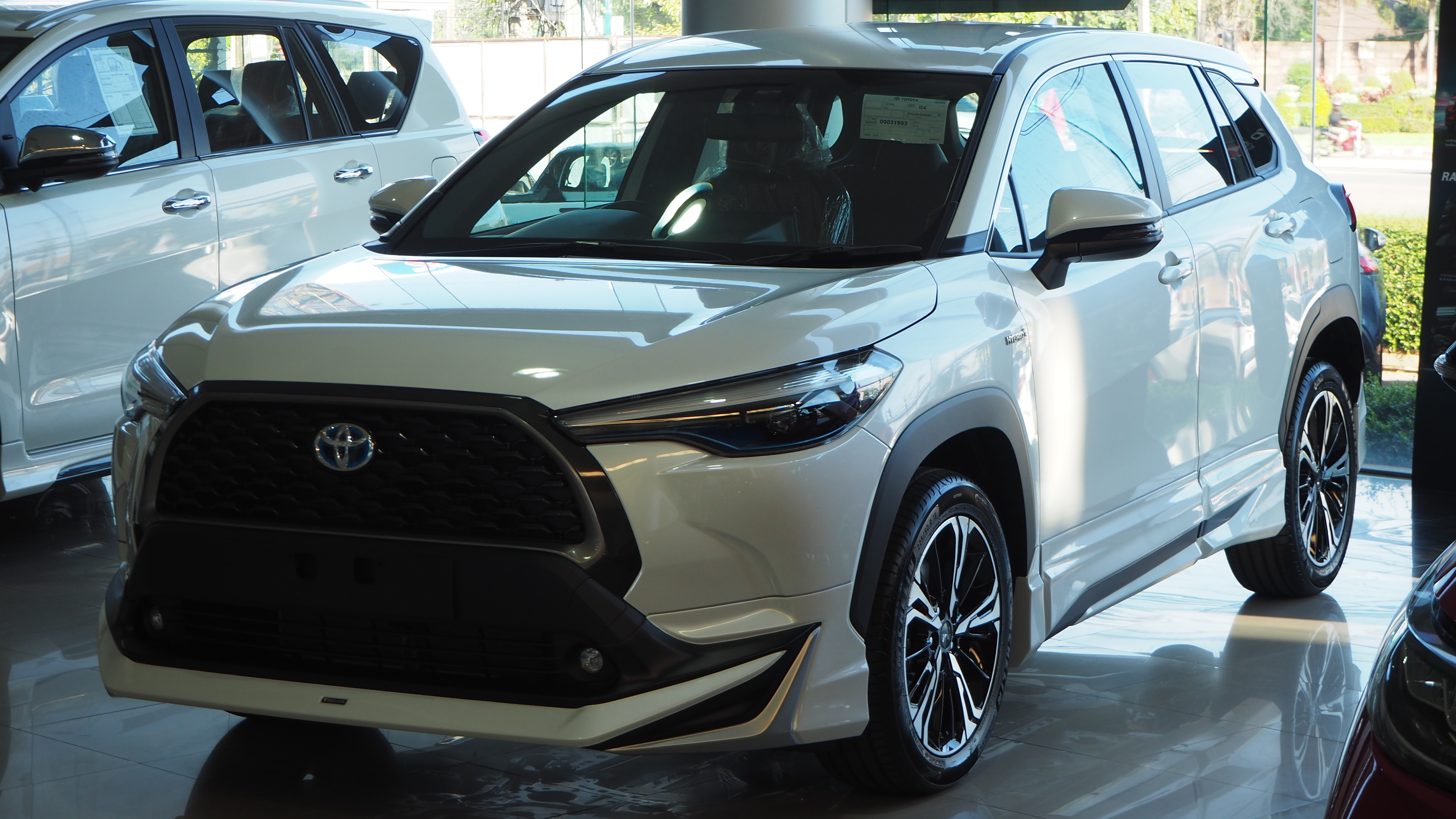
2021 Corolla Cross Hybrid with Modellista kit (Thailand)

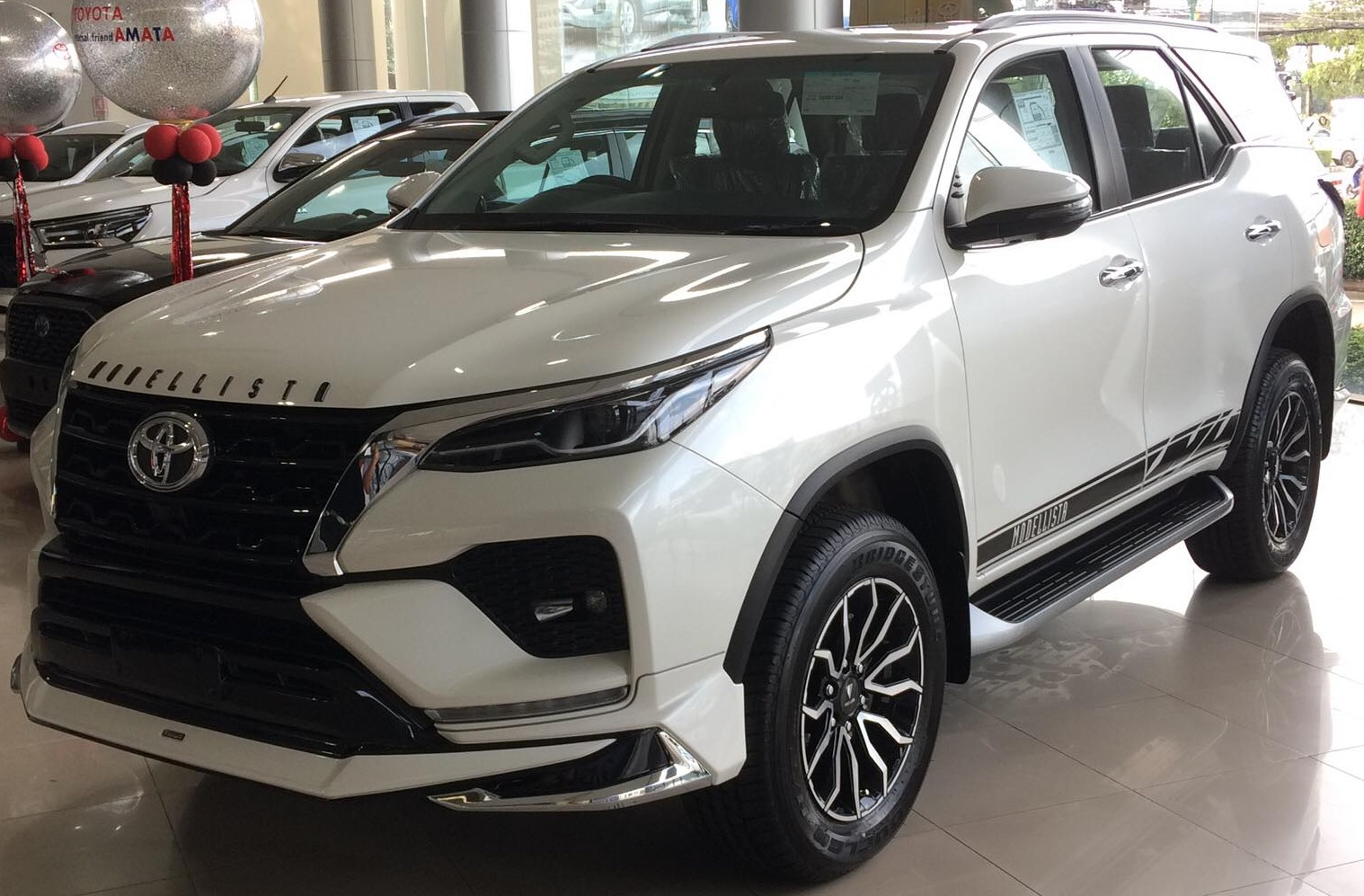
2021 Fortuner 2.4 V with Modellista kit (Thailand)

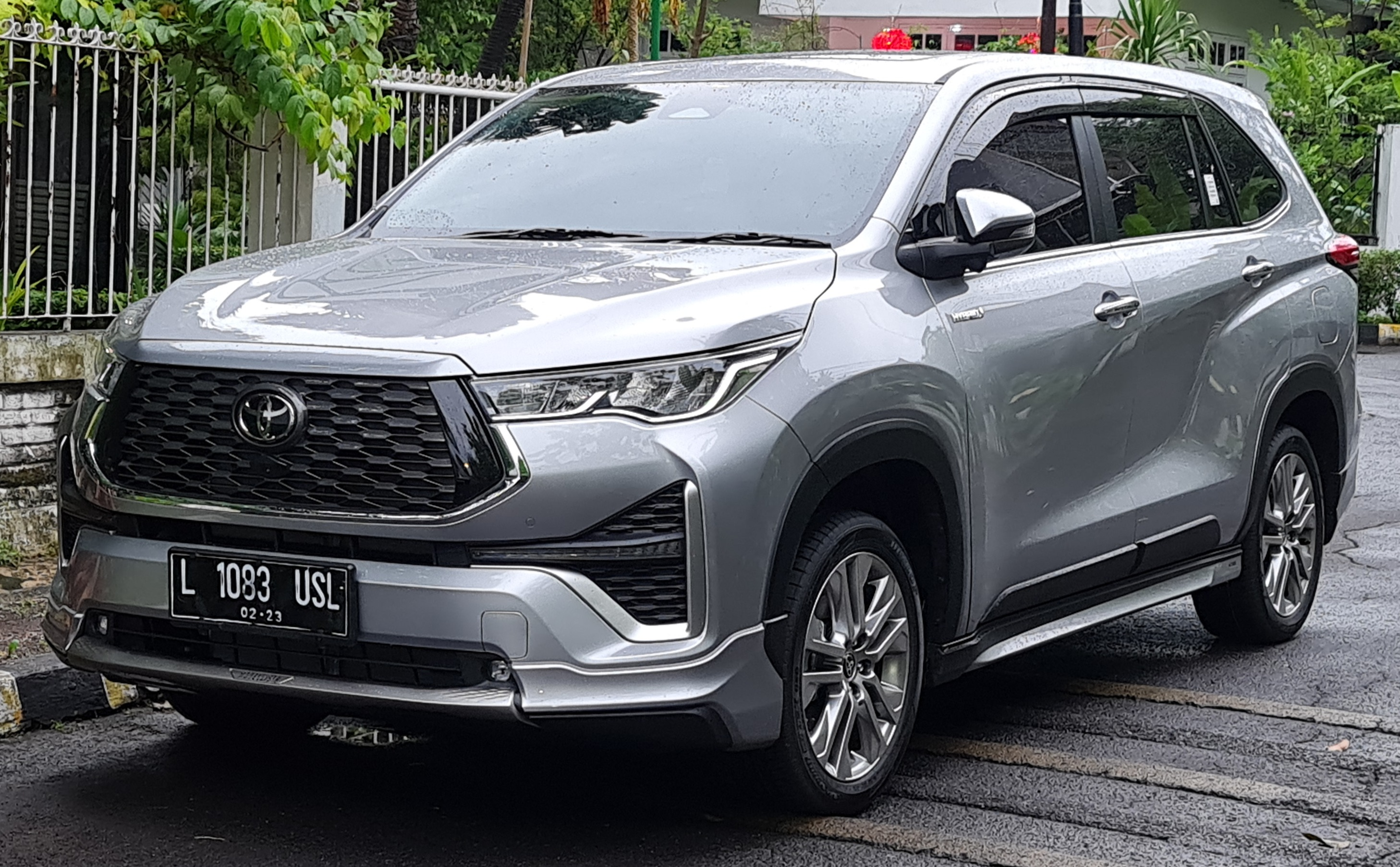
2023 Kijang Innova Zenix 2.0 Q Hybrid Modellista

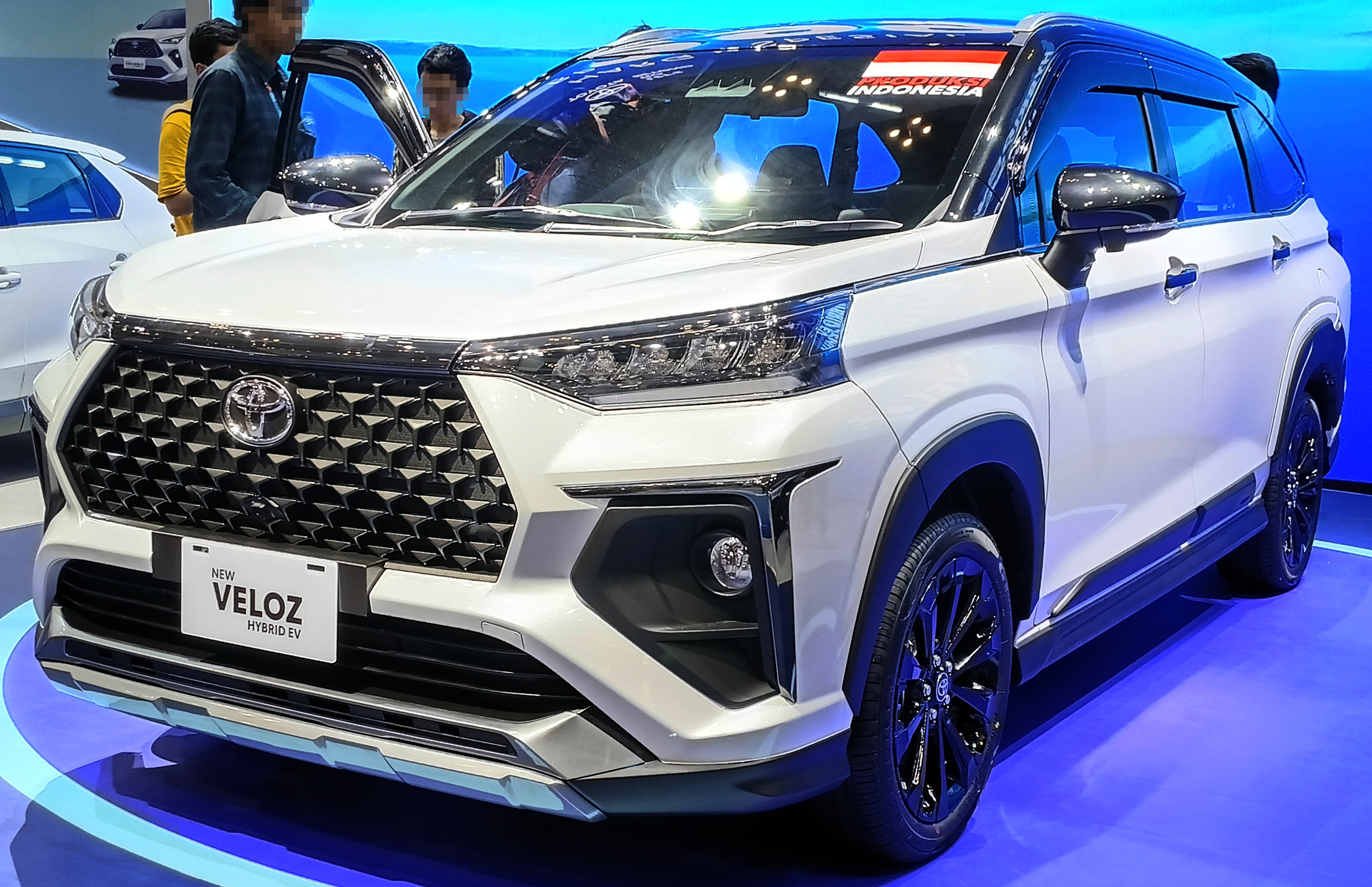
2025 Toyota Veloz 1.5 Q with Modellista Aerokit Package
