= Toyota Alphard =

Large MPV

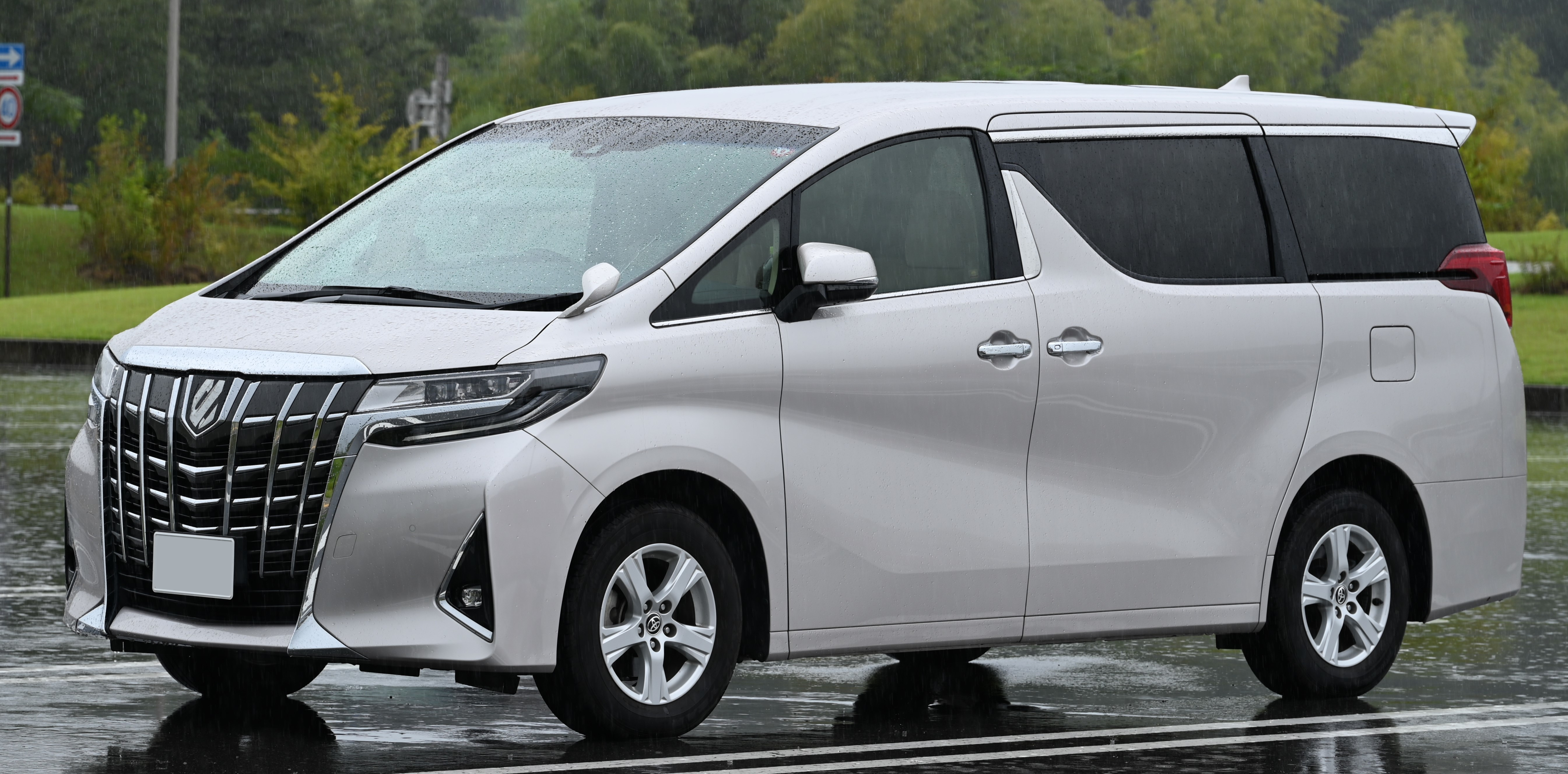
- Toyota Alphard X (AH30)

Overview
- Manufacturer: Toyota
- Also called: Toyota Vellfire (2008–present); Toyota Crown Vellfire (China, 2021–present); Lexus LM (2020–2023)
- Production: 2002–present
- Assembly: Japan: Inabe, Mie (Toyota Auto Body)

Body and chassis
- Class: Large MPV
- Body style: 5-door MPV
- Layout: Front-engine, front-wheel-drive; Front-engine, four-wheel-drive

Chronology
- Predecessor: Toyota Granvia / Grand HiAce (XH10)

The Toyota Alphard (Japanese: トヨタ・アルファード, Hepburn: Toyota Arufādo) is a large MPV (multi-purpose vehicle) produced by the Japanese automaker Toyota since 2002. It is available as a seven or eight-seater with petrol and hybrid engine options. Hybrid variants have been available since 2003, which incorporates Toyota's Hybrid Synergy Drive technology. It is Toyota's flagship MPV.

The Alphard is primarily made for the Japanese market, but is also sold in many Asian countries, Belarus, Russia, and the Middle East. Similar to the Camry, it is often regarded as a luxury car in Southeast Asian markets.

Since the second generation, a twin model called Toyota Vellfire (Japanese: トヨタ・ヴェルファイア, Hepburn: Toyota Verufaia) has also been available, which is marketed as a sportier alternative to the Alphard and exclusively marketed by the Netz Store dealership chain until 2020. Since 2019, a modified and more upscale version of the model has been sold as the Lexus LM.

The vehicle was named after Alphard, the brightest star in the constellation Hydra. Until the third generation, the Alphard wears a special front emblem which depicts the lowercase alpha letter. A prominent design feature of the Alphard is its shield-like grille, which it has had since the launch of the AH30 generation in 2015.

The name "Vellfire" was derived from "velvet" and "fire" to emphasize "smooth" and "passionate" as characteristics of the vehicle. Starting from the AH30 generation, the Vellfire has been given aggressive styling to reflect being the sportier version of the Alphard. As of the AH40 generation, the Vellfire received its own unique insignia in the form of a stylized 'V', in an effort to further distinguish it from its twin.

== First generation (AH10; 2002) ==
First generation
- Alphard G MS (pre-facelift, United Kingdom)

Overview
- Model code: AH10
- Production: 2002–2008
- Designer: Hideyuki Iwata

Body and chassis
- Platform: Toyota K platform
- Related: Toyota Previa/Estima (XR30/40); Toyota Sienna (XL10)

Powertrain
- Engine: Petrol: 2.4 L 2AZ-FE I4 (ANH10/15W); 3.0 L 1MZ-FE V6 (MNH10/15W); Petrol hybrid: 2.4 L 2AZ-FXE I4 (ATH10W)
- Electric motor: Synchronous motor (hybrid): 1EM 13 kW (17 hp; 18 PS) (front); 1FM 18 kW (24 hp; 24 PS) (rear)
- Transmission: 4-speed automatic: U140E (pre-facelift 3.0); U140F (2.4 AWD/pre-facelift 3.0 AWD); U241E (2.4 FWD); P210 e-CVT (hybrid); 5-speed automatic (facelift 3.0): U151E (FWD); U151F (AWD)
- Battery: 1.4 kWh nickel–metal hydride

Dimensions
- Wheelbase: 2,900 mm (114.2 in)
- Length: 4,800–4,865 mm (189.0–191.5 in)
- Width: 1,805–1,830 mm (71.1–72.0 in)
- Height: 1,935 mm (76.2 in)
- Curb weight: 1,770–2,050 kg (3,902–4,519 lb)

The Alphard was launched by Toyota on 22 May 2002. Developed under the lead of chief engineer Hideyuki Iwata, the first-generation model is based on the second-generation Previa/Estima, which in turn shares many components with the Camry.

The first-generation Alphard was designed with curvaceous styling that created the illusion of a smaller vehicle, to attract younger customers in the 30–40 years old range. By adopting a front-wheel drive layout, Toyota eliminated the need for a space-consuming drive shaft, which was a drawback in its predecessor, the Granvia / Grand HiAce. Although Toyota initially considered offering a diesel engine option, concerns regarding emissions and fuel efficiency regulations led to its exclusion.

During its introduction, then Toyota president Fujio Cho acknowledged that the Alphard competes in the same segment as the second-generation Nissan Elgrand, which was released a day before the Alphard. Notably, the first-generation Alphard introduced rear side windows that could be rolled down and an optional electric-powered tailgate, distinguishing it from other vehicles in the segment at that time including the Elgrand.

The Alphard V was exclusively available at the Netz Store, while the Alphard G featured a distinct grille design and was exclusive to the Toyopet Store. Toyota set a monthly sales target of 4,000 units for the V model and 2,500 units for the G model in Japan, totaling 6,500 units.

The first generation Alphard was differentiated into two variants, the Alphard G and V, which can be distinguished by their grilles; the G had a chrome grille with three horizontal rows and diagonal louvers, while the V had a body-colored grille with horizontal louvers. The Alphard V was replaced by the sportier Vellfire. Early the Alphard V and G grades were: MX/AX, MS/AS, and MZ. A "Welcab" version was also available to make it accessible for who needed wheelchairs.

The Alphard was refreshed in April 2005. The design of the front grille, bumper, headlamps, and rear combination lamps and garnish was updated. For the 3.0-litre model, the 4-speed automatic transmission was replaced with a 5-speed automatic transmission.

In 2006, a Royal Lounge Alphard was introduced. It is a more upmarket, four-seat version of the Alphard G.

For model year 2007, on Japanese models only, G-BOOK, a subscription telematics service, was offered as an option.

Alphard V

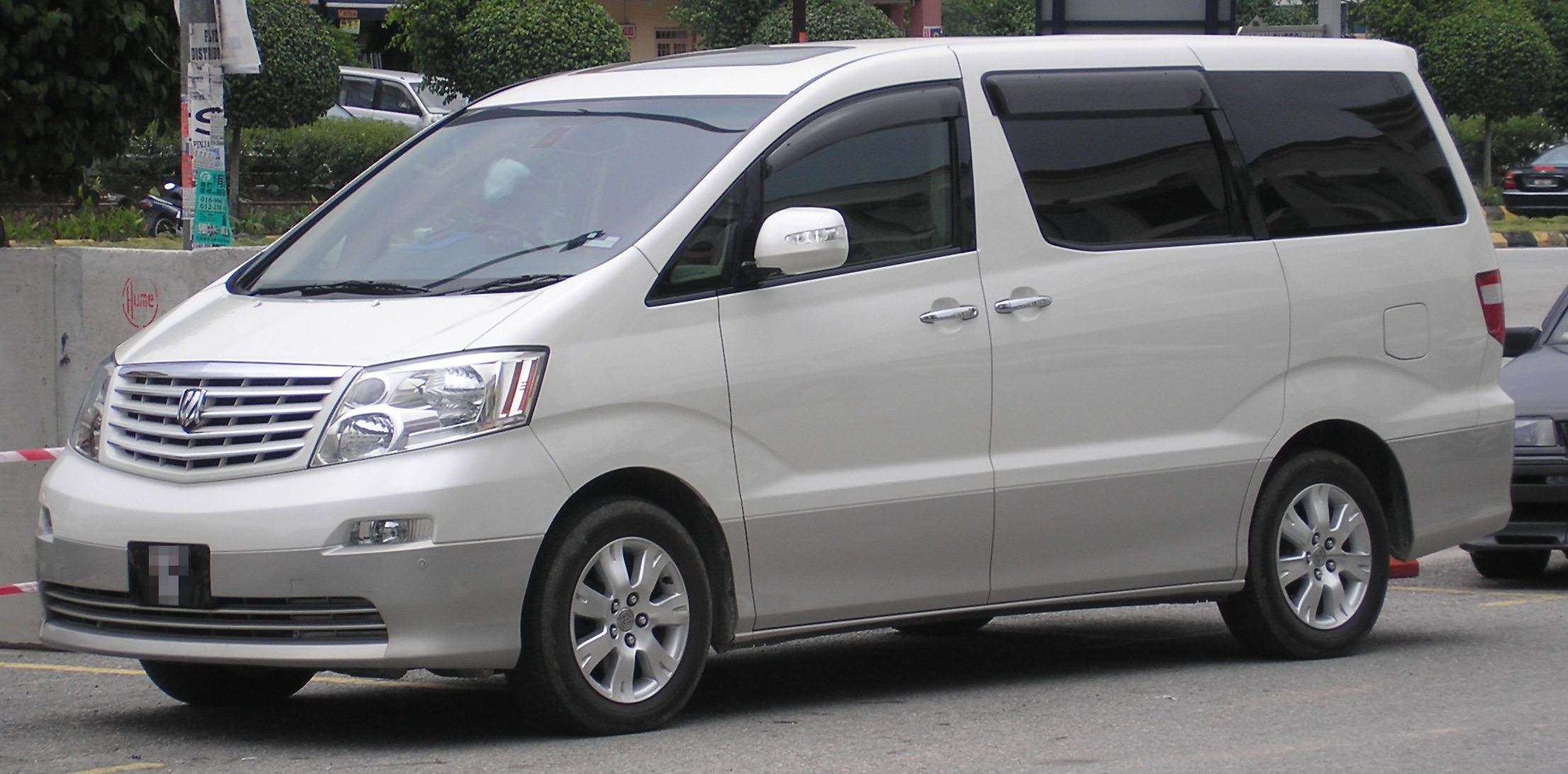
Alphard V MZ (pre-facelift; front view)

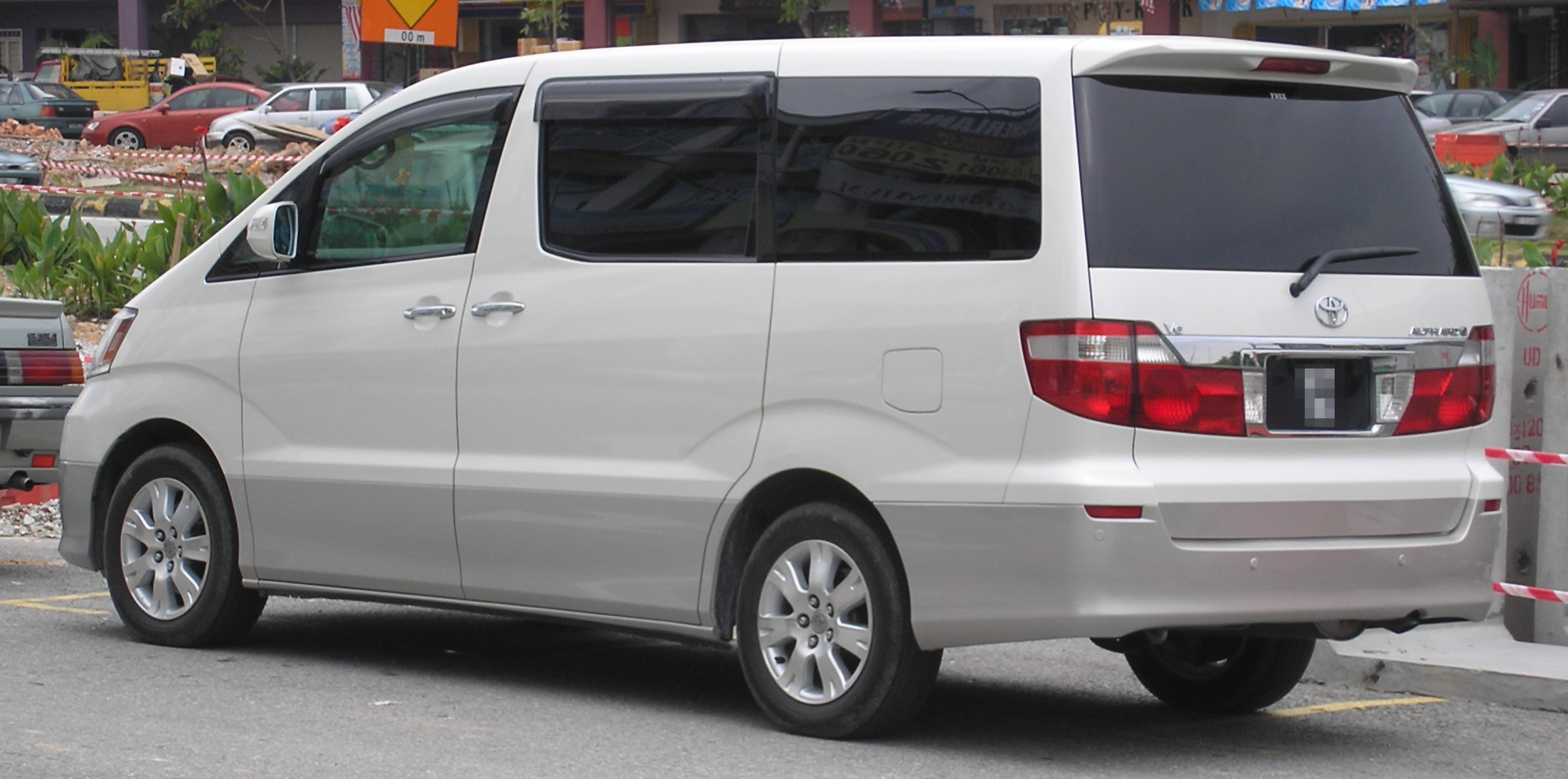
Alphard V MZ (pre-facelift; rear view)

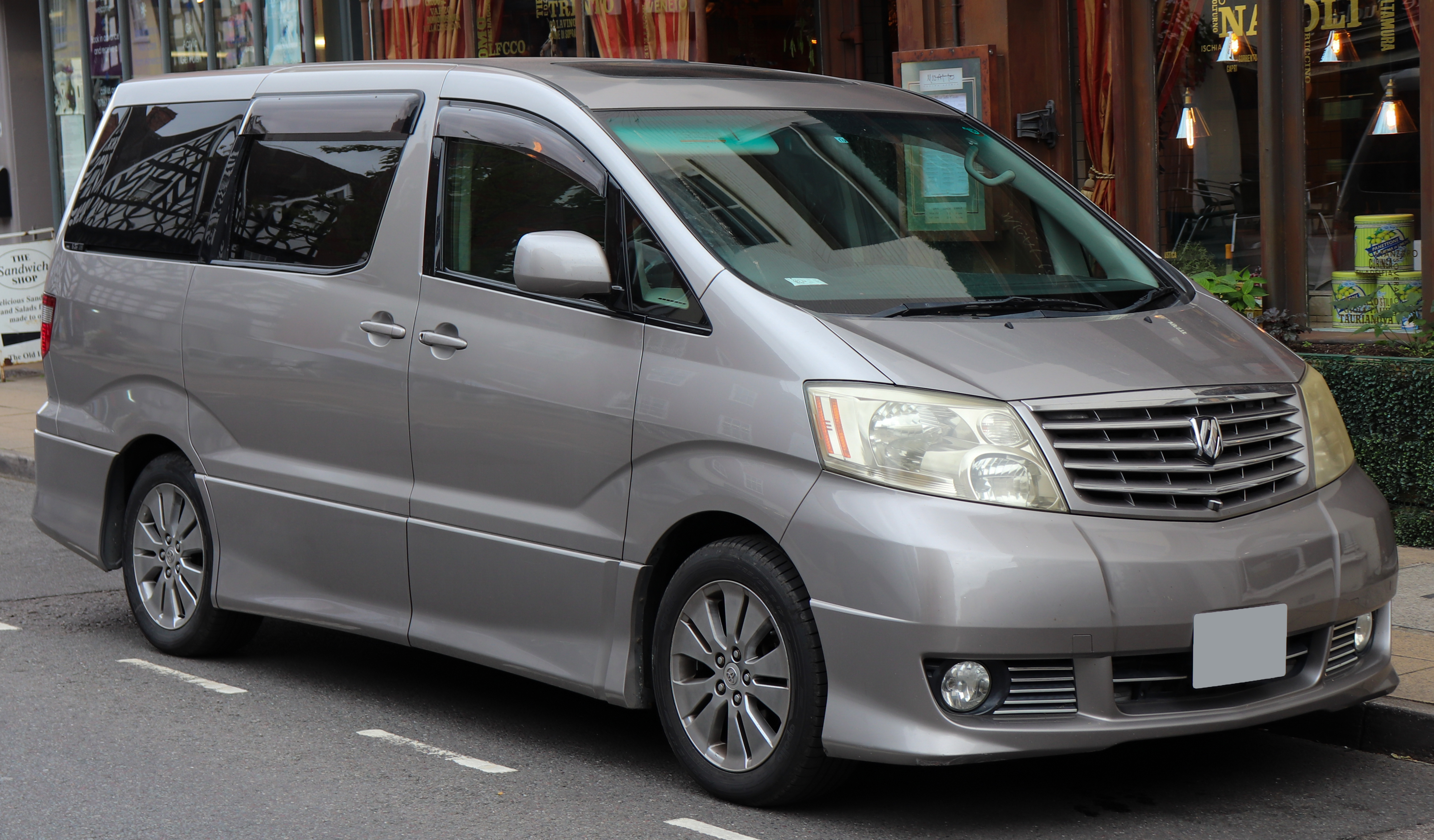
Alphard V AS (pre-facelift)

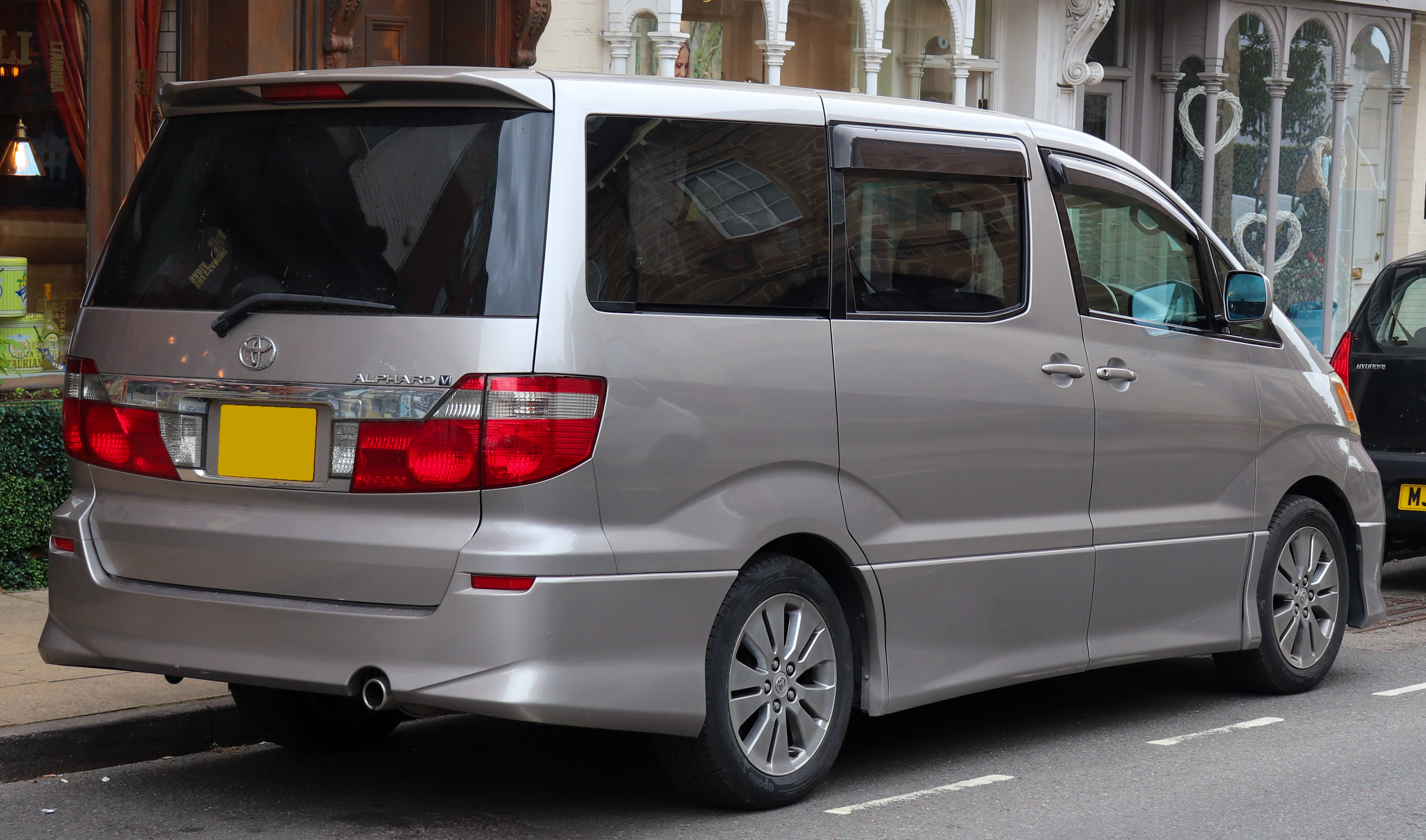
Alphard V AS (pre-facelift; rear view)

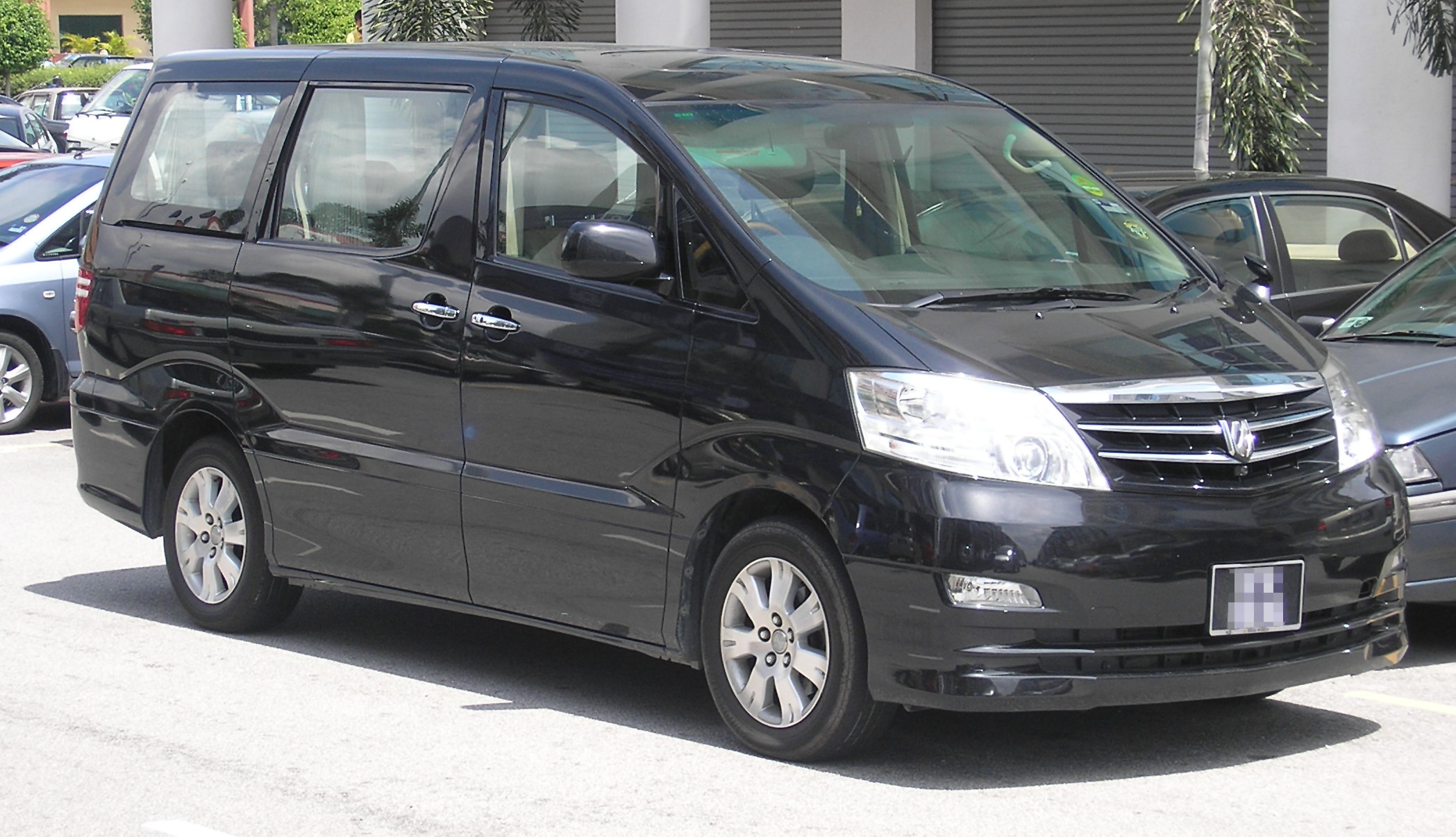
Alphard V (facelift)

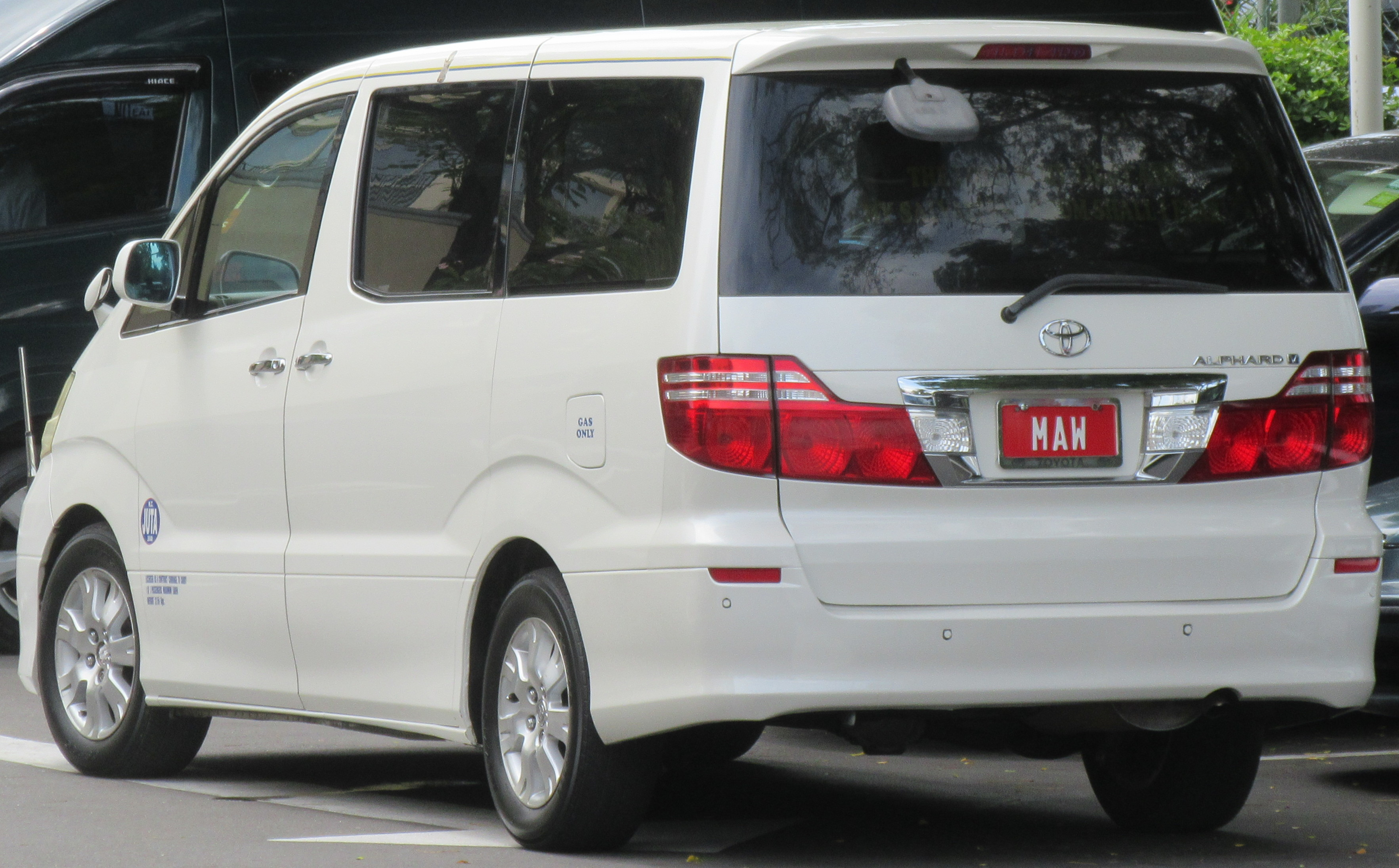
Alphard V AX (facelift; rear view)

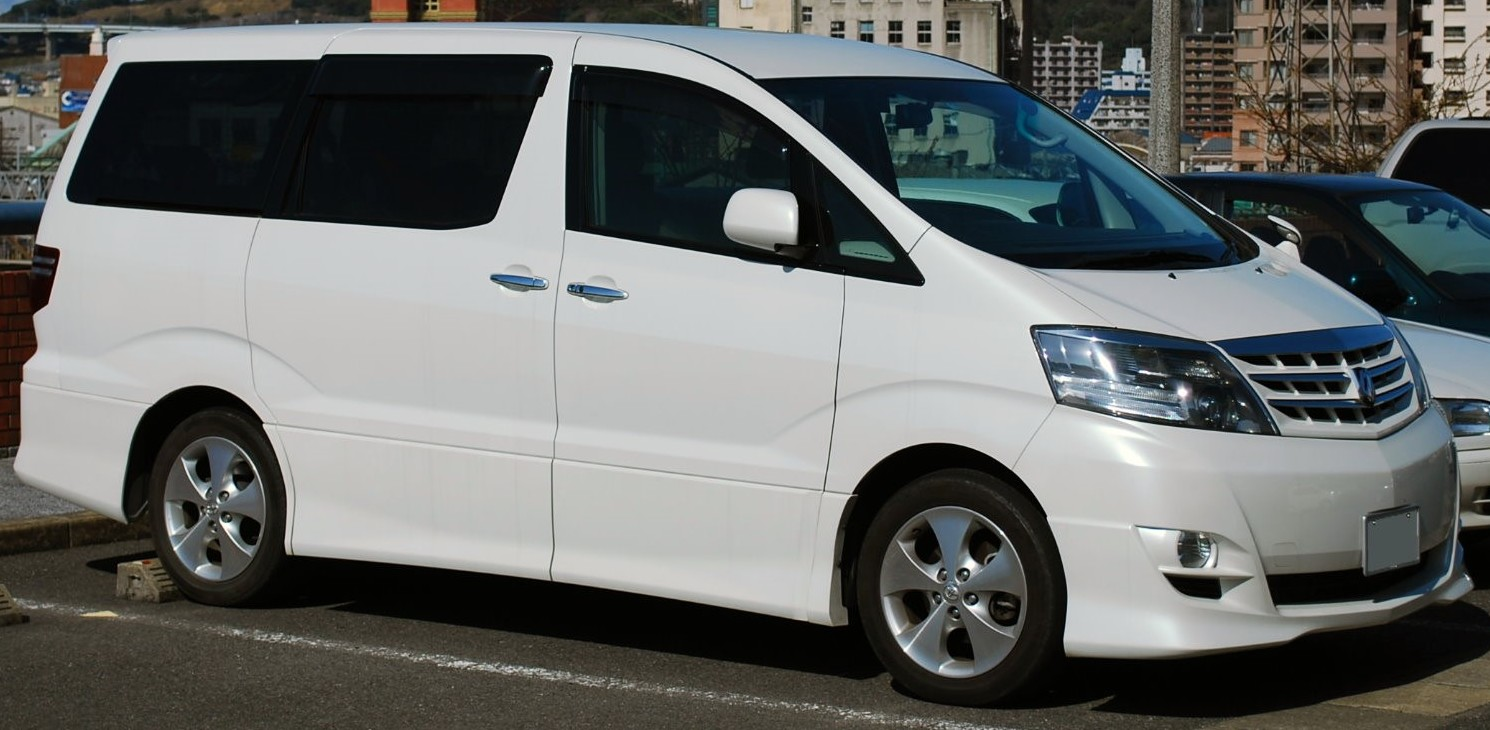
Alphard V MS/AS (facelift, Japan)

Alphard G

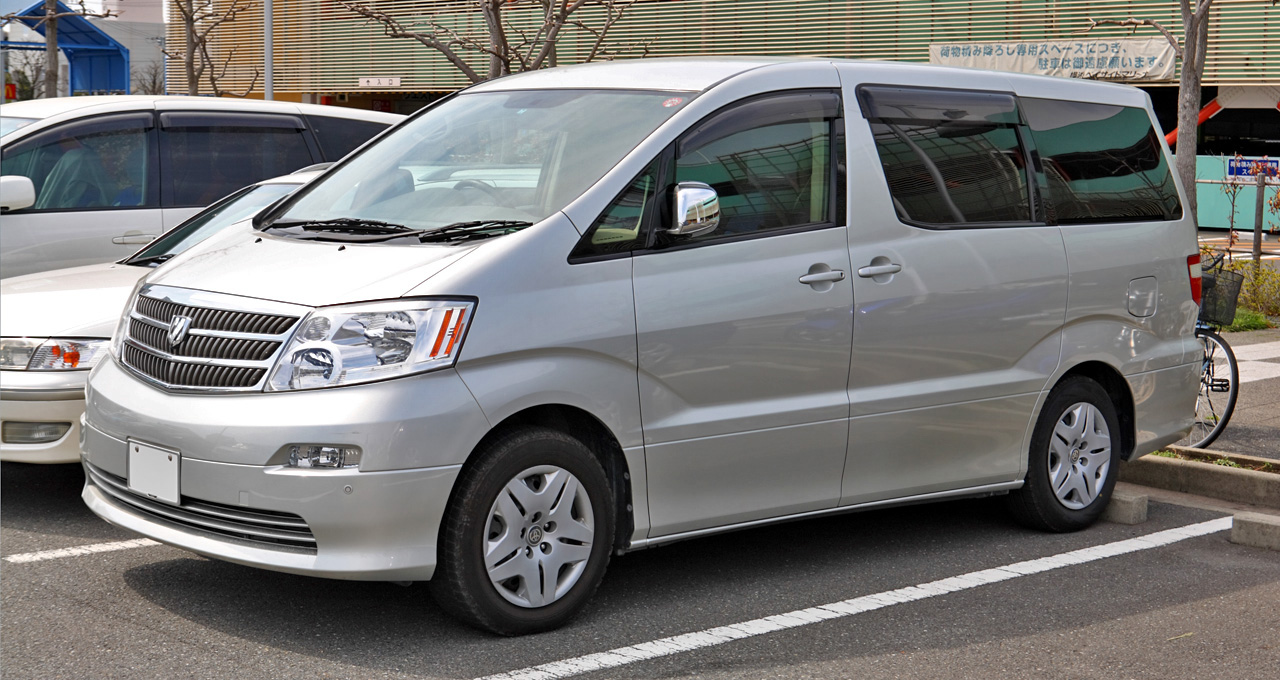
Alphard G AX (pre-facelift, Japan)

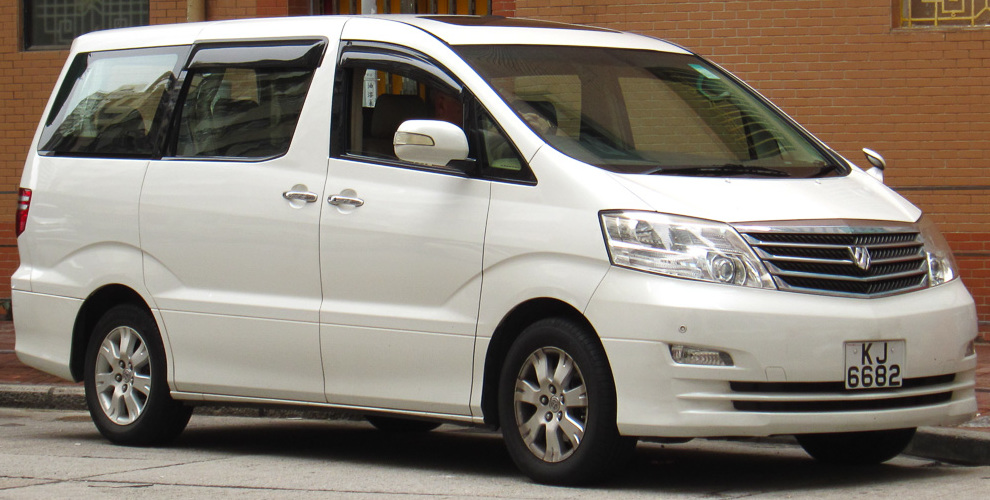
Alphard G (facelift)

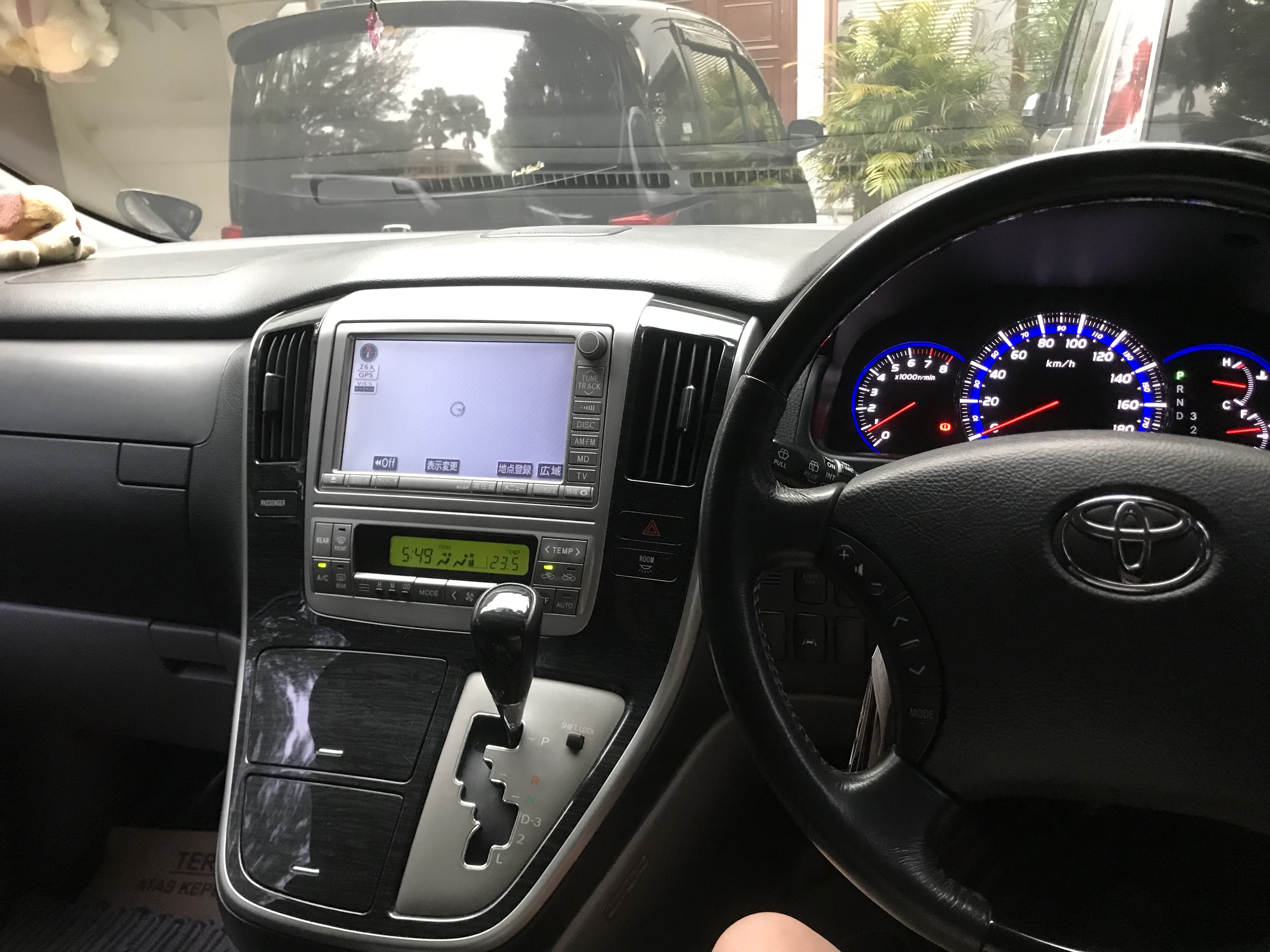
Interior (MS/AS)

=== Alphard Hybrid (2003) ===
A hybrid version was also added to the lineup in May 2003, featuring a 2.4-litre 2AZ-FXE Atkinson cycle petrol engine with a power output of 133 PS (98 kW; 131 hp) and 190 N⋅m (140 lb⋅ft) of torque which has been developed specifically for use in Toyota's Hybrid Synergy Drive technology and features a high-expansion ratio cycle that raises efficiency and reduces friction; however, this led to reliability problems of pistons' rings premature wear and consequent high oil consumption due to the poorly designed ring in order to minimize friction.

The Alphard Hybrid uses "by-wire" technology that monitors brake pedal pressure and vehicle speed in order to calculate the optimum hydraulic pressure. By-wire works with the E-Four AWD system to maximize the collection of kinetic energy from braking for conversion into electric power. The Alphard Hybrid can also generate up to 1,500 watts and is equipped with 100-volt AC power outlets, to power external appliances such as laptops and emergency lights.

In Japan, the Alphard Hybrid locally qualifies as an Ultra-Low Emissions Vehicle (ULEV), achieving emission levels 75% lower than the Japanese government's year 2000 benchmark.

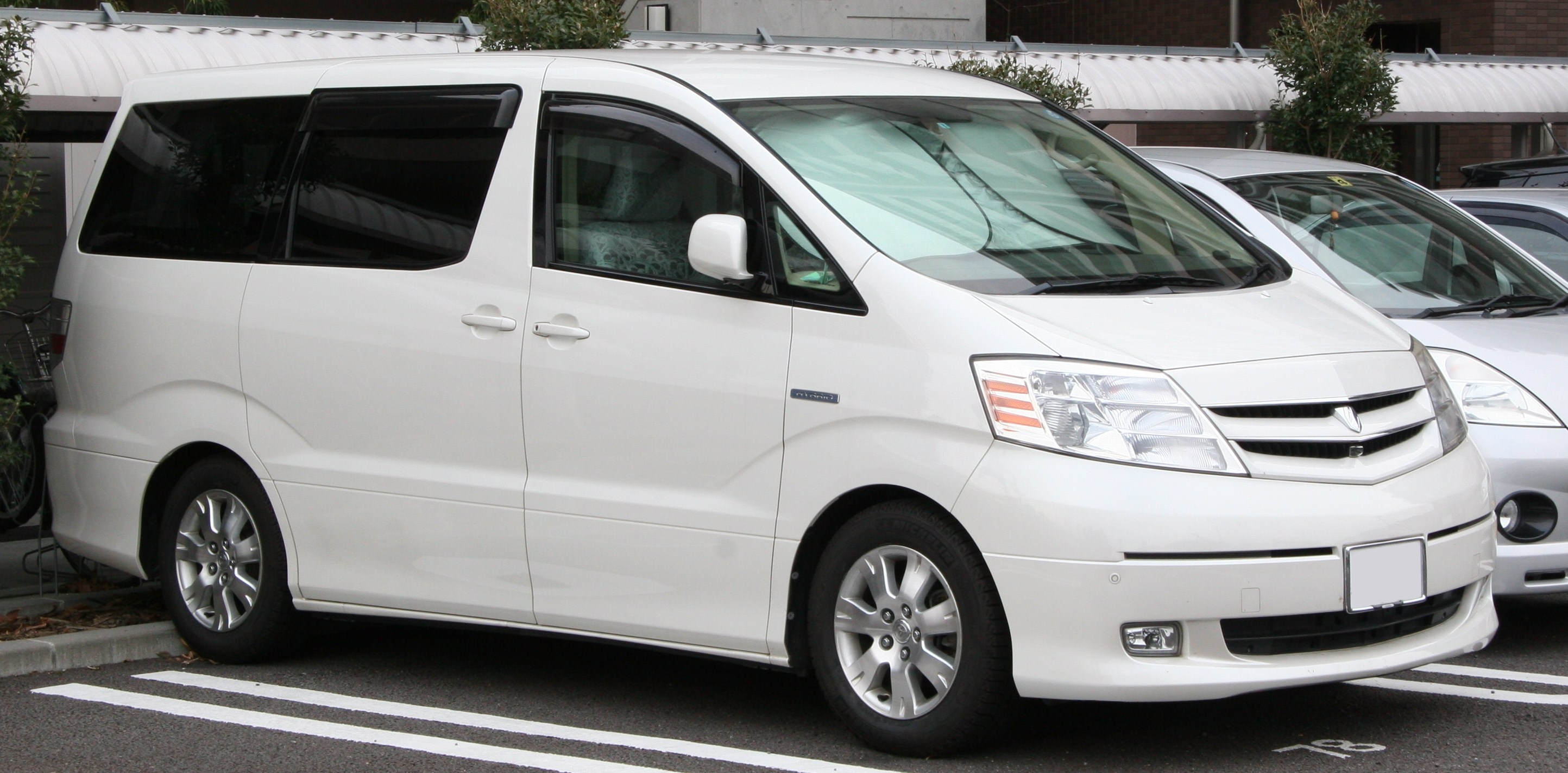
Alphard Hybrid (pre-facelift, Japan)

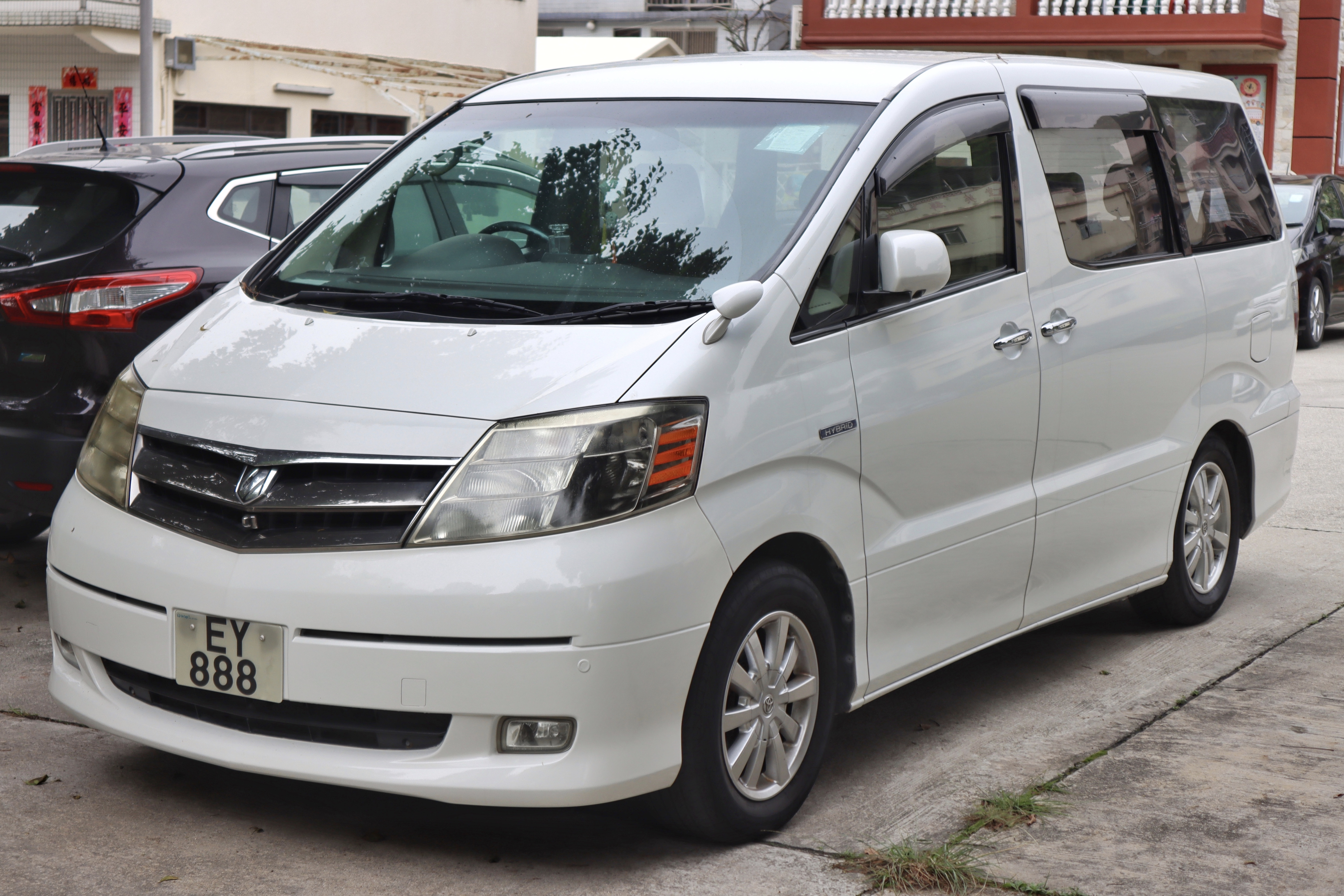
Alphard Hybrid (facelift)

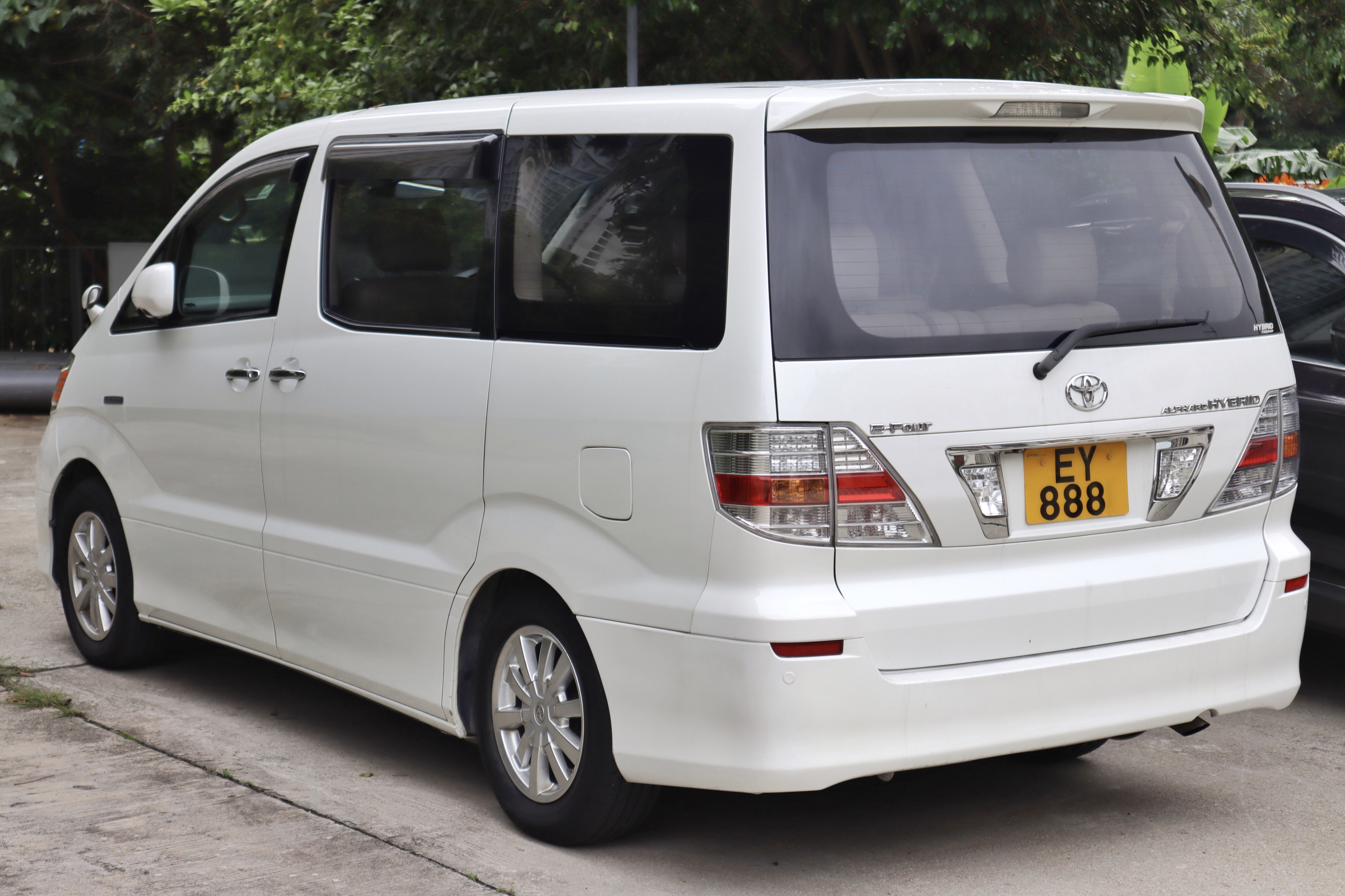
Alphard Hybrid (facelift; rear view)

=== Alphard Royal Lounge (2006) ===
In 2006, Toyota introduced a special version of the Alphard designed by Modellista as an ultra-luxury version of the Alphard G with four seats, a table with multiple cabinets for cup storage, a fridge, and a small cupboard. It also featured fully reclining rear seats with independently adjustable seatbacks and legrests with footrests popping out, electric curtains, individual business-class style armrest folding tables, and reading lamps.

== Second generation (AH20; 2008) ==
Second generation
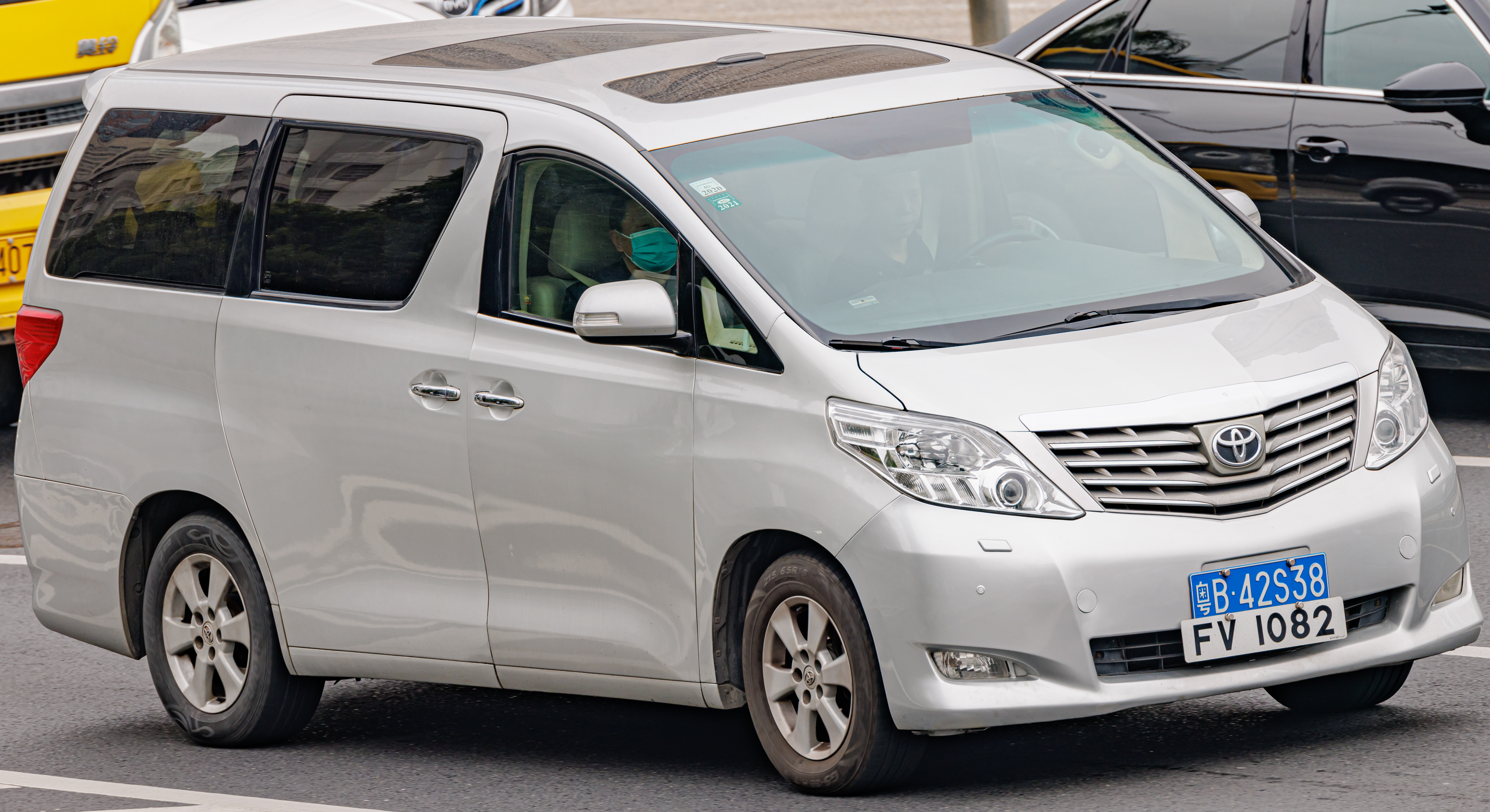
- Alphard (AH20L; pre-facelift, China)

Overview
- Model code: AH20
- Also called: Toyota Vellfire
- Production: May 2008 – 2015
- Designer: Yuzo Nakagoshi

Body and chassis
- Platform: Toyota New MC platform
- Related: Toyota Previa/Estima (XR50)

Powertrain
- Engine: Petrol: 2.4 L 2AZ-FE I4; 3.5 L 2GR-FE V6; Petrol hybrid: 2.4 L 2AZ-FXE I4
- Transmission: 6-speed U660E/F automatic (3.5); 7-speed K112/F Super CVT-i automatic (2.4); P311 e-CVT (2.4 hybrid)

Dimensions
- Wheelbase: 2,950 mm (116.1 in)
- Length: 4,850–4,925 mm (190.9–193.9 in)
- Width: 1,830–1,840 mm (72.0–72.4 in)
- Height: 1,870–1,915 mm (73.6–75.4 in)
- Curb weight: 1,850–2,200 kg (4,079–4,850 lb)

After being previewed as the FT-MV in 2007, the second generation Alphard went on sale in May 2008. For this generation, a twin model called the Vellfire, was introduced as the successor of the first-generation Alphard V, with a split headlight and taillight design. According to Toyota's press release, the Alphard is described as having an "elegant and sophisticated" design while the Vellfire emphasizes on "strength and strong individuality".

Developed under the guidance of chief engineer Yuzo Nakagoshi, the second generation Alphard adapted many similar design cues from the first generation, featuring similarly-designed headlights and taillights. Both models are sold via separate distribution channels, with the Alphard sold by Toyota's Toyopet Store dealership chain, while the Vellfire is sold at Toyota's youth oriented Netz Store dealership chain.

Variants of the Alphard/Vellfire include:

- 2.4-litre petrol 2-wheel drive - ANH20 (Alphard/Vellfire)
- 2.4-litre petrol 4-wheel drive (Toyota ATC/DTC) - ANH25 (Alphard/Vellfire)
- 3.5-litre petrol 2-wheel drive - GGH20 (Alphard/Vellfire)
- 3.5-litre petrol 4-wheel drive (Toyota ATC/DTC) - GGH25 (Alphard/Vellfire)
- 2.4-litre hybrid 4-wheel drive (E-Four) - ATH20 (Alphard/Vellfire)

The second generation Alphard was launched in the Philippines on 3 August 2010.

=== Grade levels ===
- Alphard X/Vellfire X - Available with 2.4 and 3.5 petrol engines. Base spec model, Beige cloth interior, 7 or 8 seats, usually just one powered door, xenon headlights, many options available.
- Alphard S/Vellfire Z - Available with 2.4 and 3.5 petrol engines. Middle spec. Sportier exterior with body side mouldings and deeper front and rear bumpers. Dark grey/black cloth interior, 7 seat only with ottomans, powered doors on both sides, LED strip lighting, powered mirrors, climate control front and rear. Many special edition variants adding various option packs, usually including a powered tailgate and/or cruise control and/or part-leather trim:
  - Platinum selection/Platinum Selection 2 (Vellfire Z)
  - Golden Eyes/Golden Eyes 2 (Vellfire Z)
  - Prime/Prime 2 (Alphard S)
  - Type Gold/Type Gold 2 (Alphard S)
- Alphard G/Vellfire V - Available with 2.4 and 3.5 petrol engines. Top spec of standard range. Beige cloth interior, 7 or 8 seats, powered doors on both sides. Cruise control standard. Electric powered front seats with drivers memory, front passenger seat has a powered ottomon (leg rest). Powered tailgate is an option.
- Alphard S - C Package/Vellfire Z - G Package - Available with 3.5 engine only up until November 2011. It was only offered in 7 seats. Adds middle row captain chairs with powered ottomans and powered recline, side and tailgate doors powered, twin sunroof an option. Premium sound system an option with factory rear monitor.
- Alphard G - L Package/Vellfire V - L Package - Available with 3.5 engine only up until November 2011. 7 seats only. Standard beige leather, upgraded middle row captain chairs also in leather with powered recline and powered ottomons. Front seats heated. Twin sunroofs standard. Option to have middle row seats heated and ventilated. Radar Cruise Control and Lane Keeping Assist (LKA) optional.
- Royal Lounge - Available with 3.5 engine only up until November 2011. Dealer spec option to have the rear interior to be stripped out and replaced with two luxury first class seats with a limousine-like experience for its passengers. Approved conversions were carried out by Modellista.

Alphard

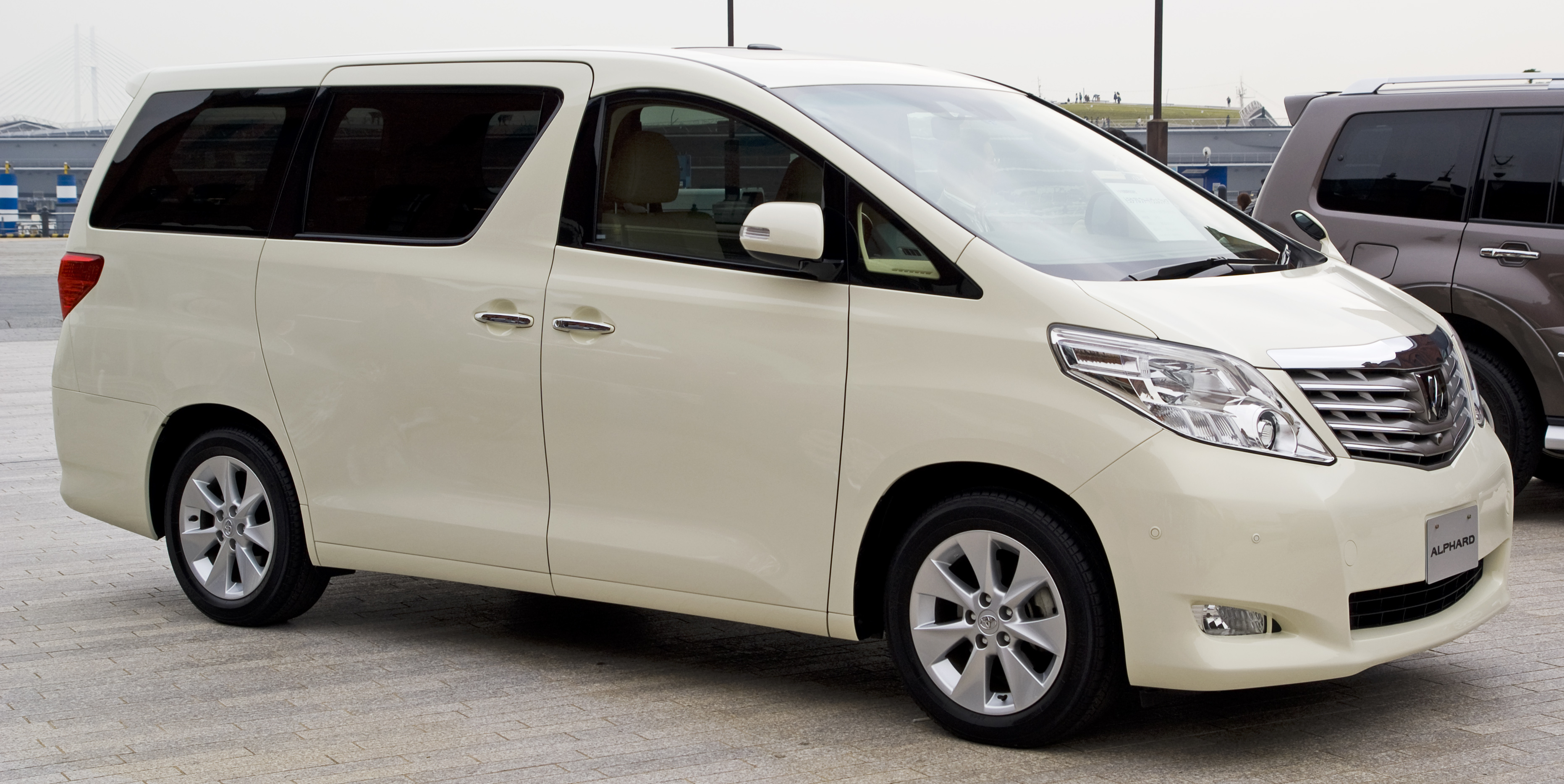
2008 Alphard 350G (GGH20W; pre-facelift, Japan)

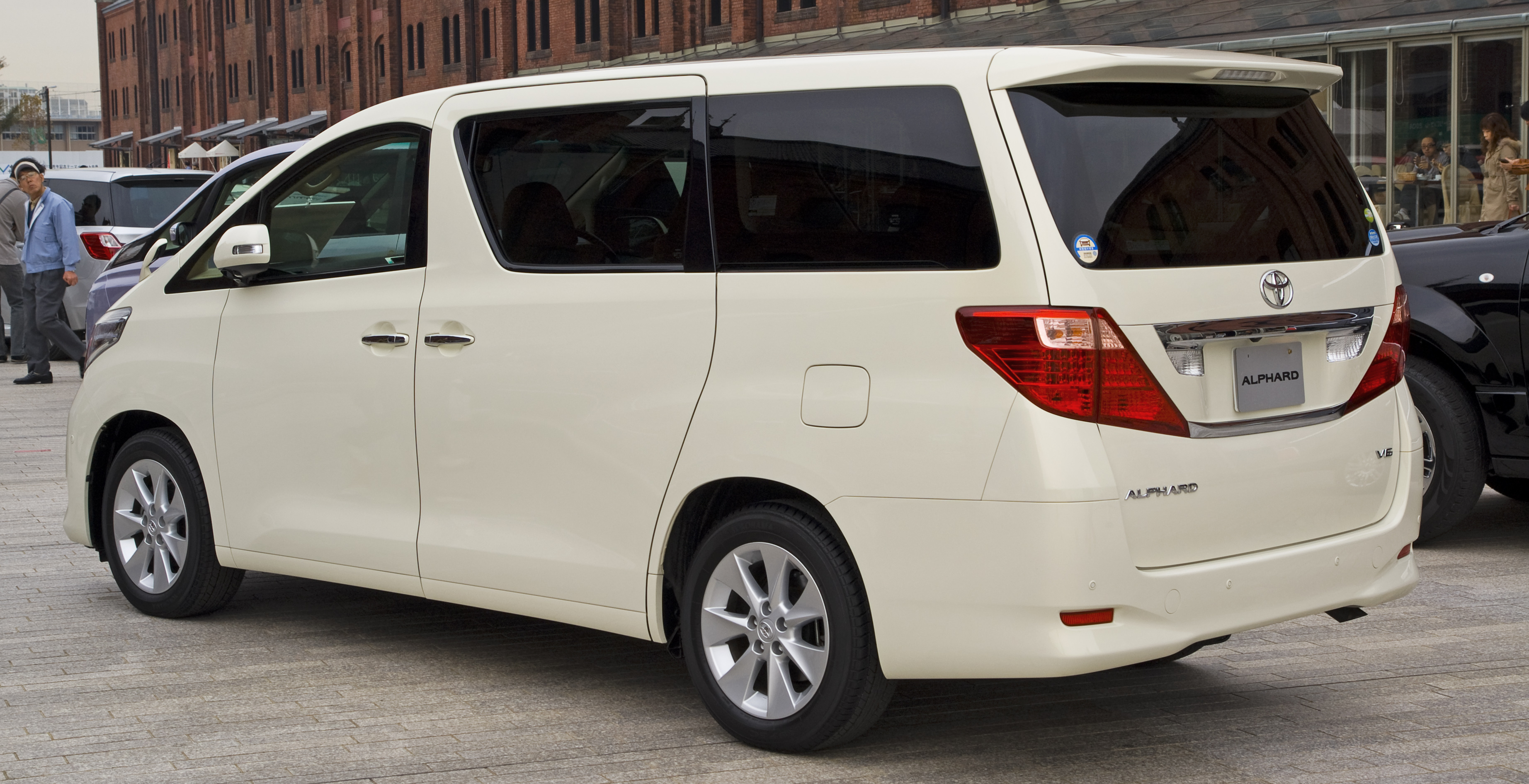
2008 Alphard 350G (GGH20W; pre-facelift, Japan)

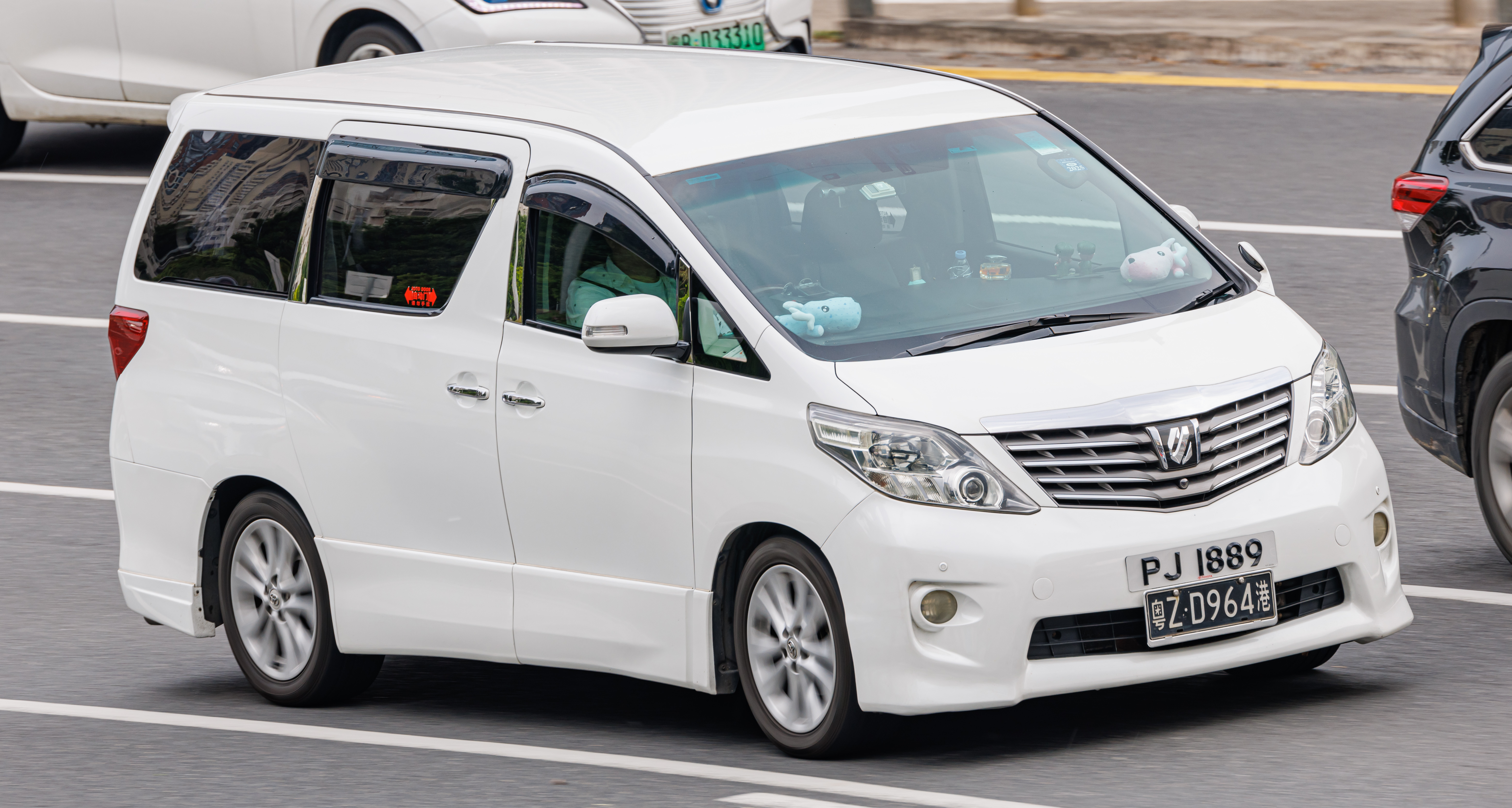
Alphard S (AH20W; pre-facelift)

Alphard X (AH20W; pre-facelift)

Vellfire

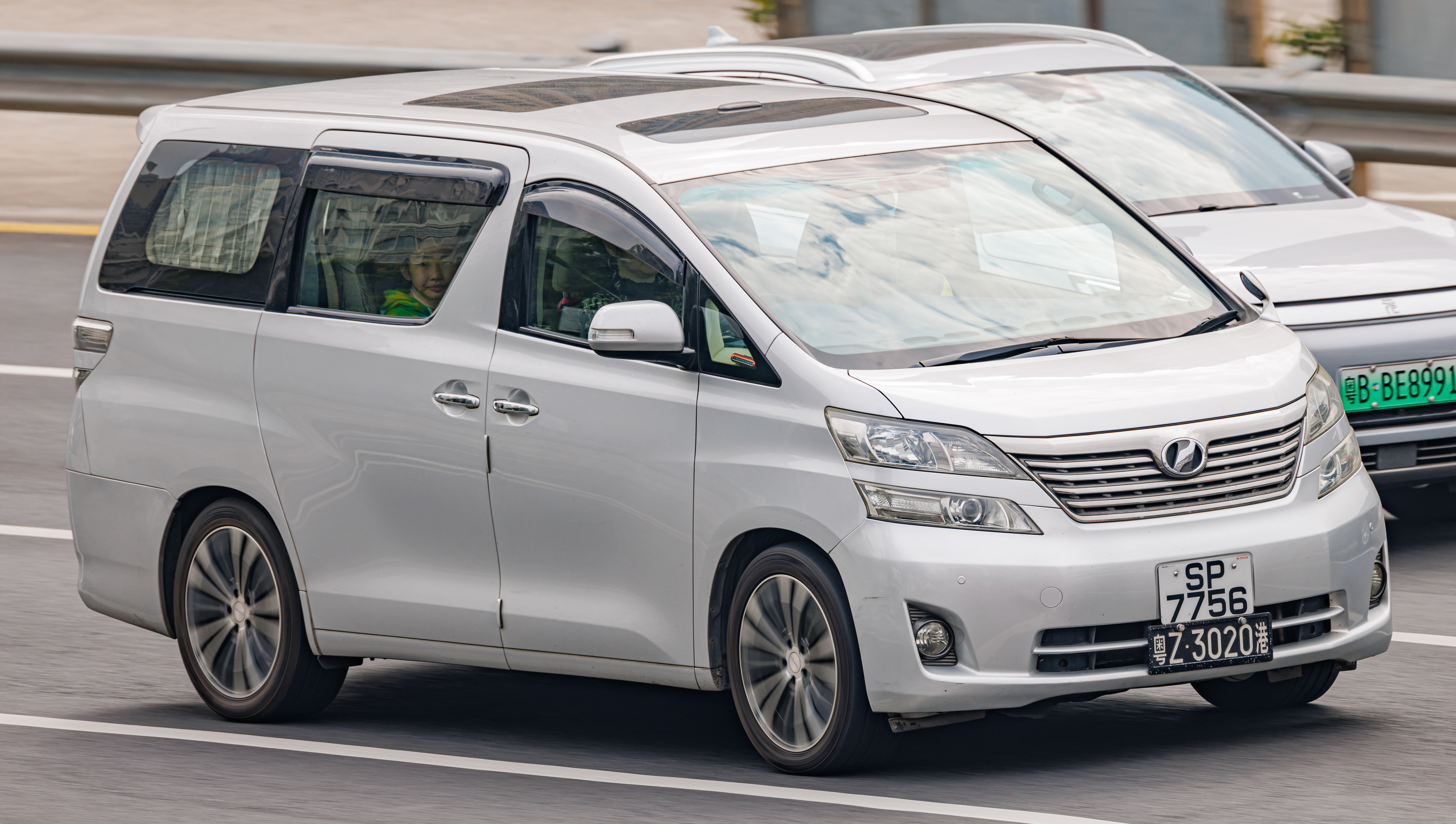
Vellfire (AH20W; pre-facelift)

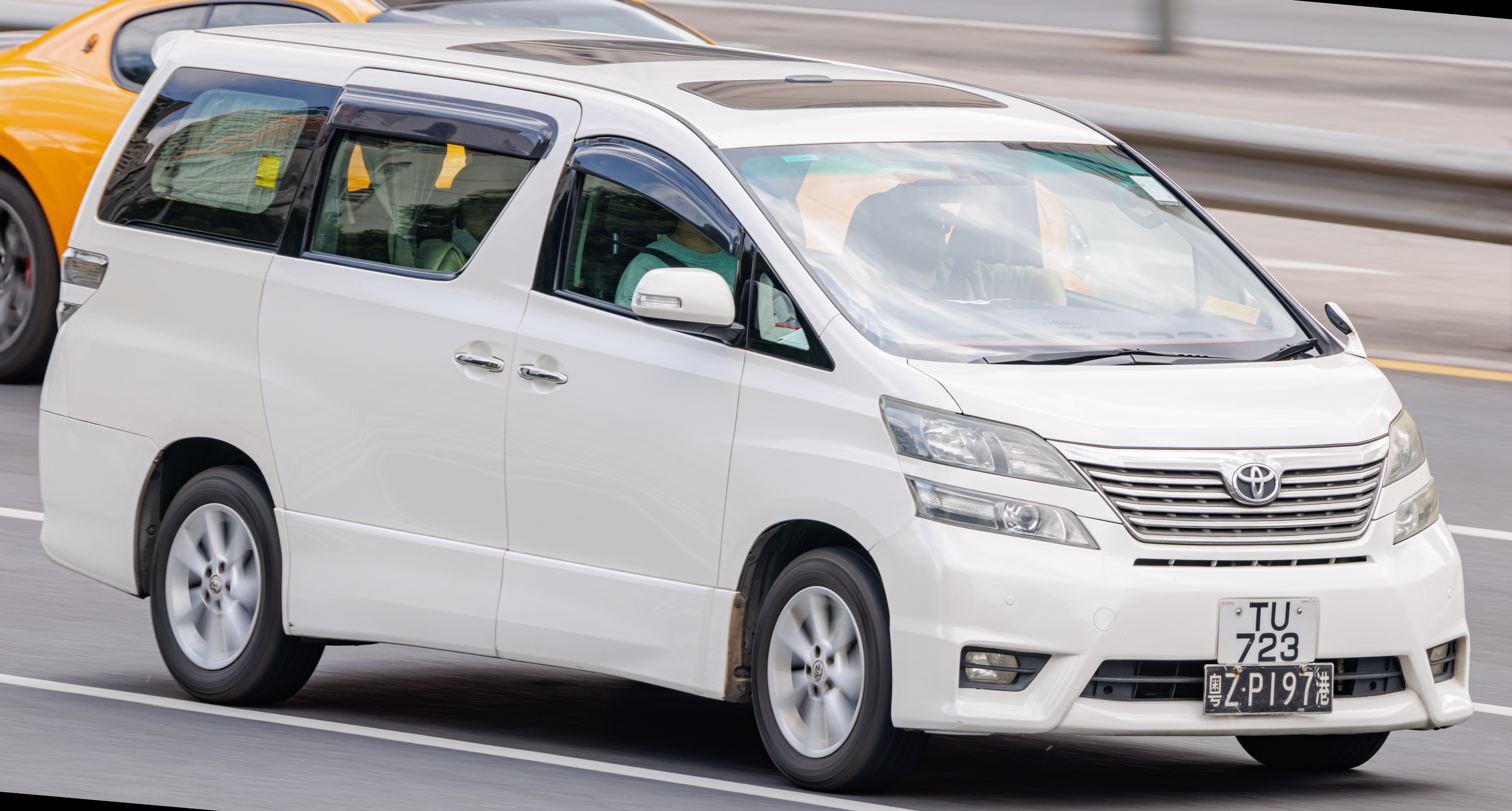
Vellfire Z (AH20R; pre-facelift)

Vellfire 3.5 Z G-Edition AWD (GGH25W; pre-facelift)

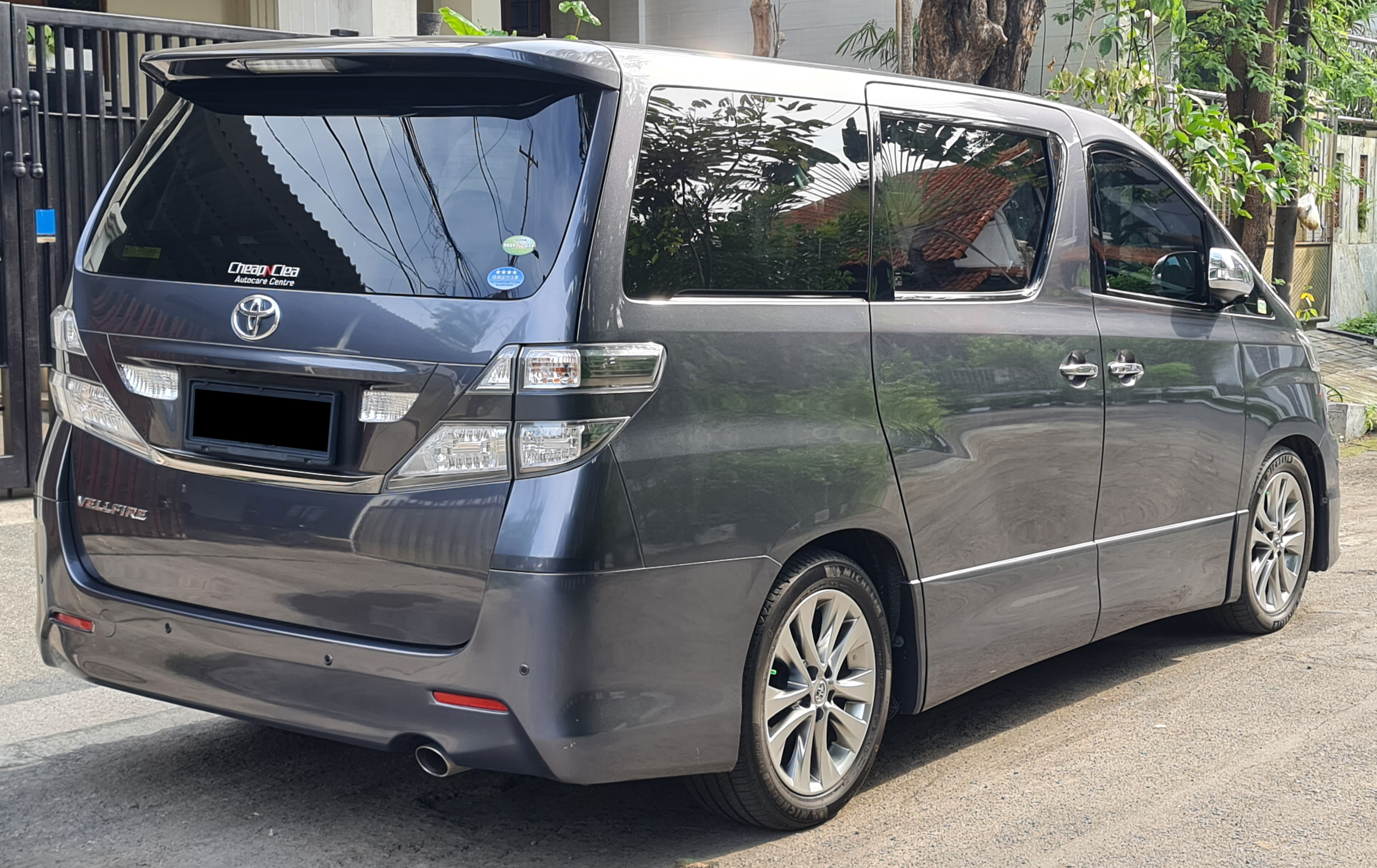
Vellfire 2.4Z (ANH20W; pre-facelift)

=== 2011 facelift ===
A facelift model was announced by Toyota on 27 September 2011, with sales in Japan started from 1 November 2011. Also introduced a hybrid version of both the Alphard and Vellfire.

The hybrid version was reintroduced in November 2011 and whilst the model variants remained similar, all grades were available in all three drivetrains, 2.4/3.5/2.4 Hybrid. The Hybrid was the later generation of THS2 with Eco Mode and EV mode. The petrol variants also received Eco mode buttons on the dash, helping to smooth out acceleration and to improve efficiency. Styling differences introduced across all models and interior trim colours and materials improved. Nanoe air purifiers were available in almost all variants.

- Alphard X/Vellfire X - Spec similar to pre-facelift, available in 2.4 and 3.5 petrol and 2.4 Hybrid
- Alphard S/Vellfire Z - Available in 2.4 and 3.5 petrol with Eco mode. 2.4 Hybrid was named Alphard SR and Vellfire ZR, and had cruise control and Nanoe Air purification as standard.
- Alphard G/Vellfire V - Available with 2.4 and 3.5 petrol engines with Eco mode and also with 2.4 Hybrid.
- Alphard S "C package"/Vellfire Z "G Edition" - Available in 2.4 and 3.5 petrol with Eco mode. 2.4 Hybrid was named Alphard SR-C and Vellfire ZR-G. As pre-facelift, but black leather interior much more common, Hybrid models slightly higher spec as standard, but many options available to all variants.
- 'Alphard G "L package"/Vellfire V"L Edition" - Available in 2.4 Hybrid and 3.5 petrol with Eco mode. (G"L package"/V"L Edition" is not available in 2.4 petrol variant, making the Alphard S "C package"/Vellfire Z "G Edition" the top spec 2.4 petrol variant)
- G's – Limited edition by Gazoo based on Alphard S/Vellfire Z, known as the 'GS' or 'G Sport' or 'Gazoo Sport'. Includes Gazoo body kit and styling, Gazoo alloys and half-leather trim with G's logos. Performance exhaust and deeper rear bumper meant no spare wheel carrier, a puncture repair kit was supplied instead. In October 2013 the 2.4 and 3.5 petrol engine was added.
- Premium Seat Package - Premium seat package added heated and cooled middle row captain chairs. In effect this package put all options onto the G/V (both hybrid and 3.5 V6 petrol) and SR/ZR (hybrid only) variants, making them the highest spec 7 seaters available, including the twin sunroofs.

Alphard

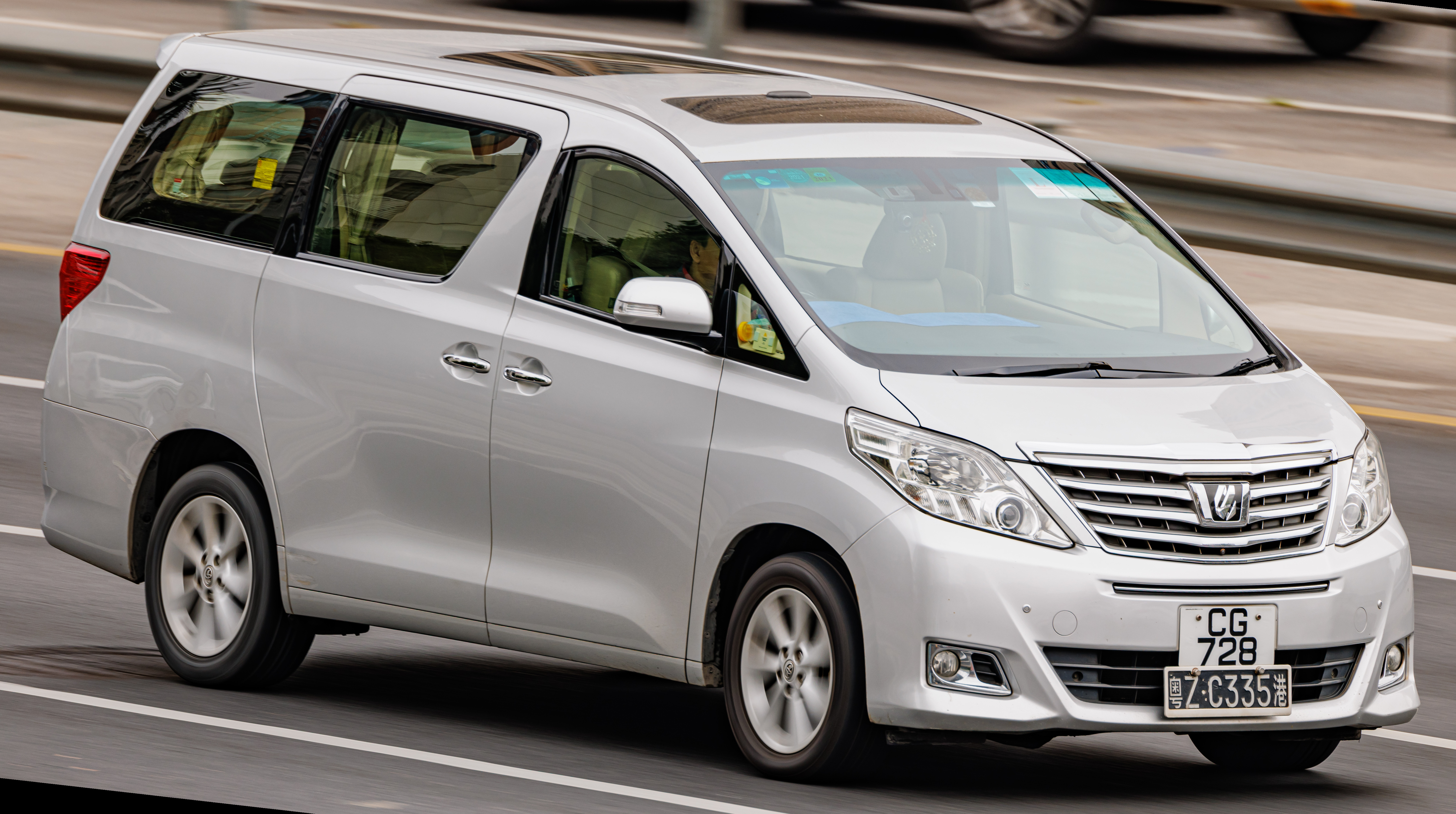
Alphard (AH20W; facelift)

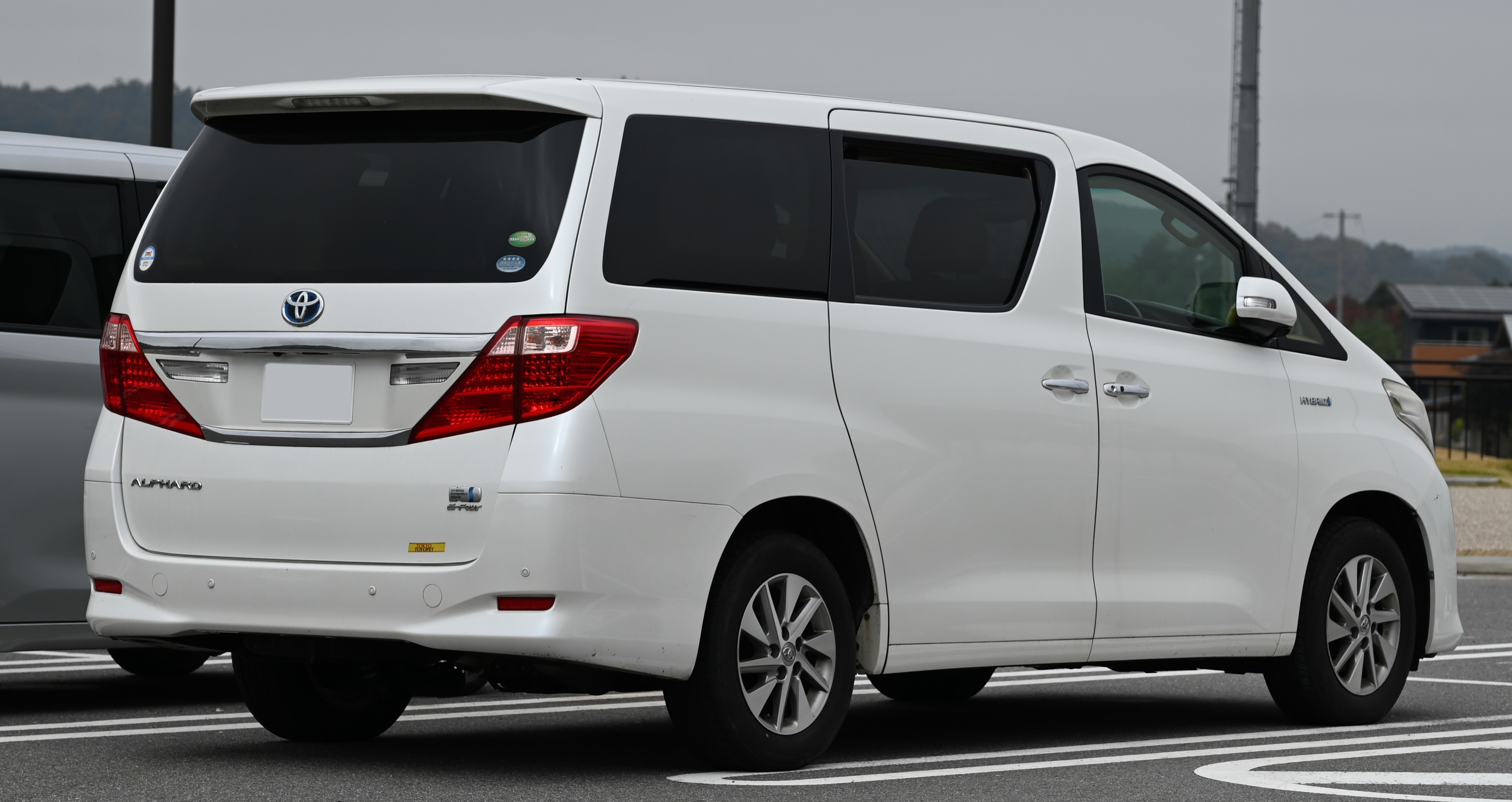
Alphard Hybrid (ATH20W; facelift)

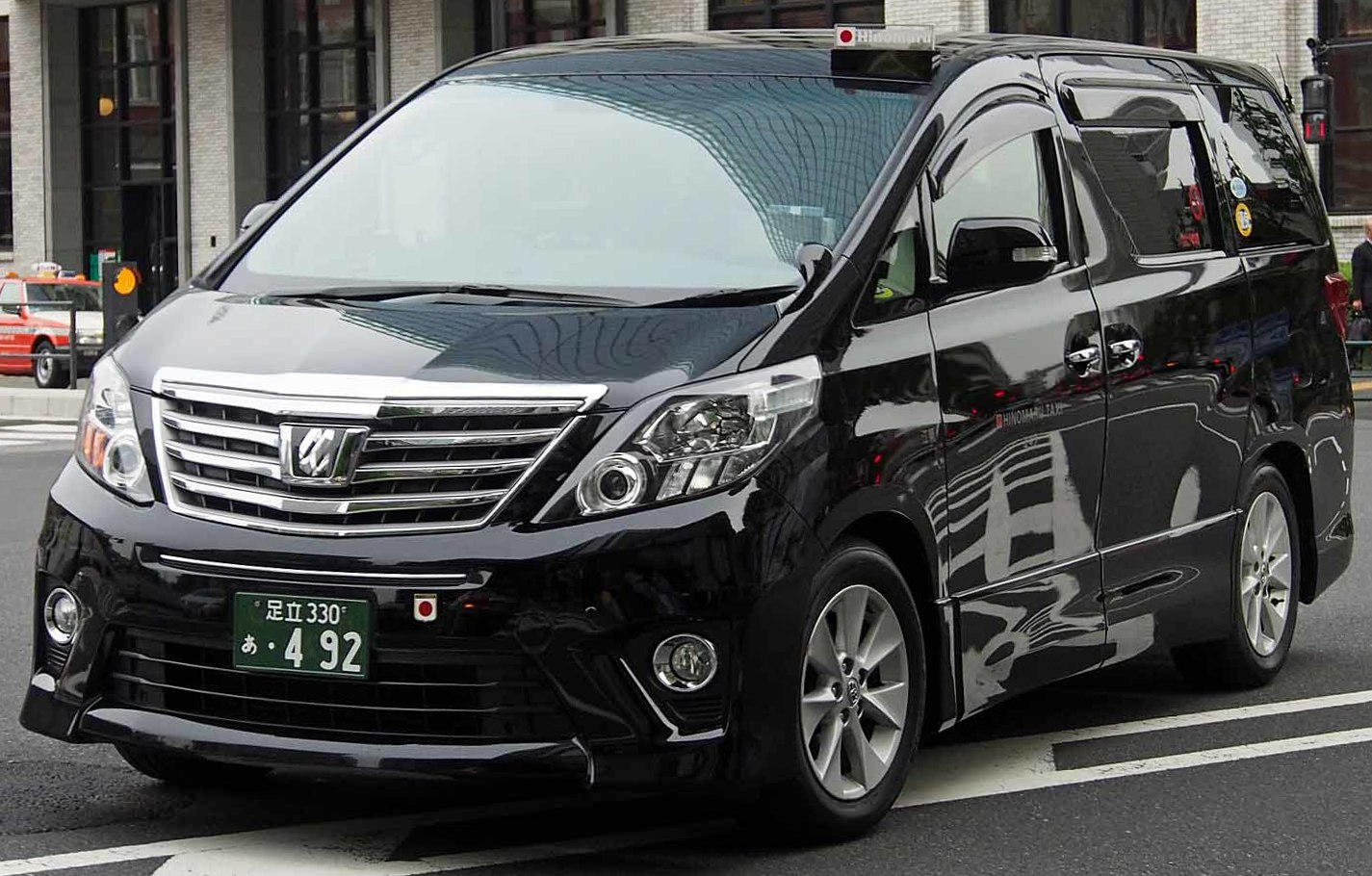
Alphard S (AH20W; facelift, Japan)

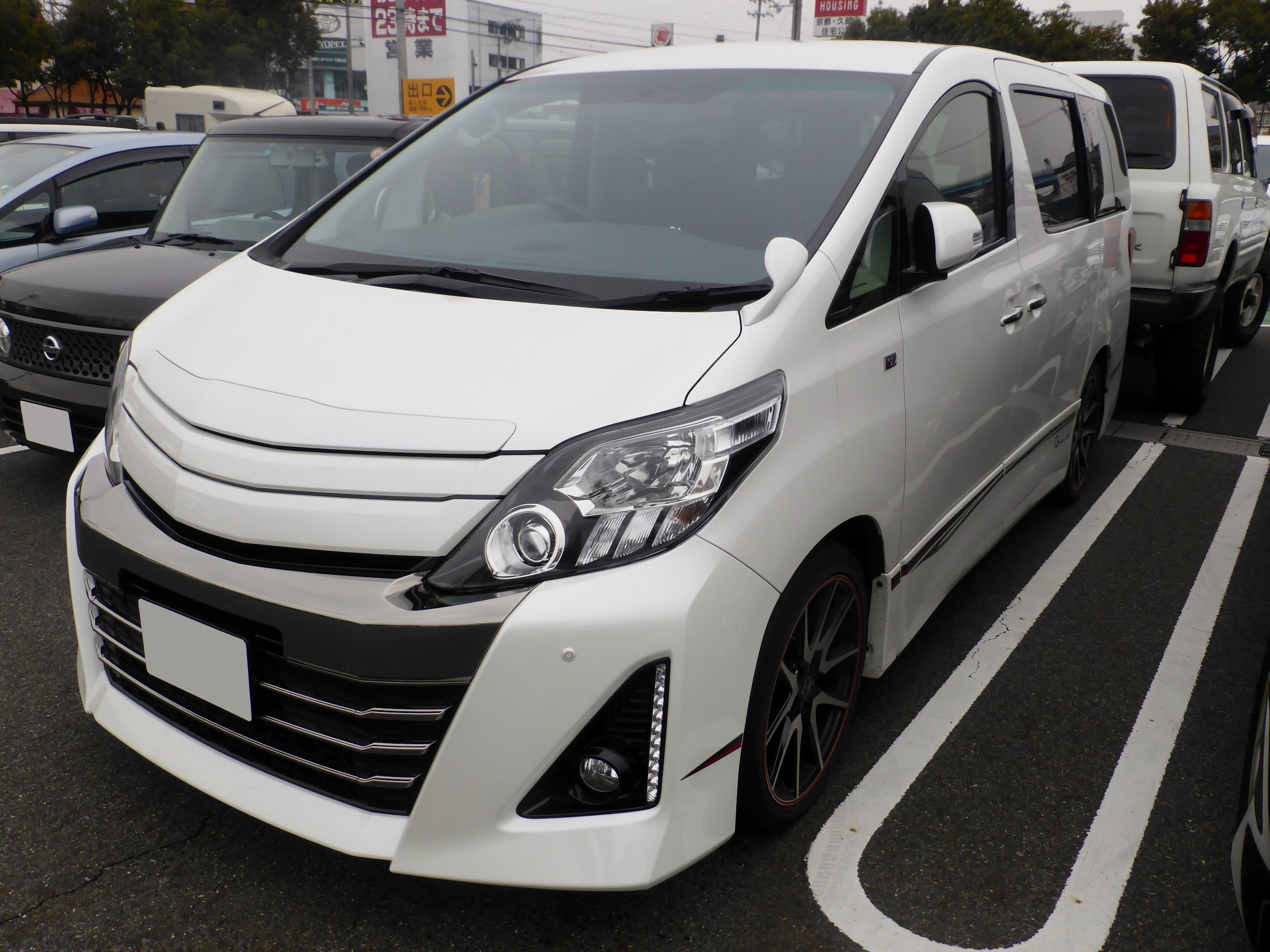
Alphard 350S G's

Vellfire

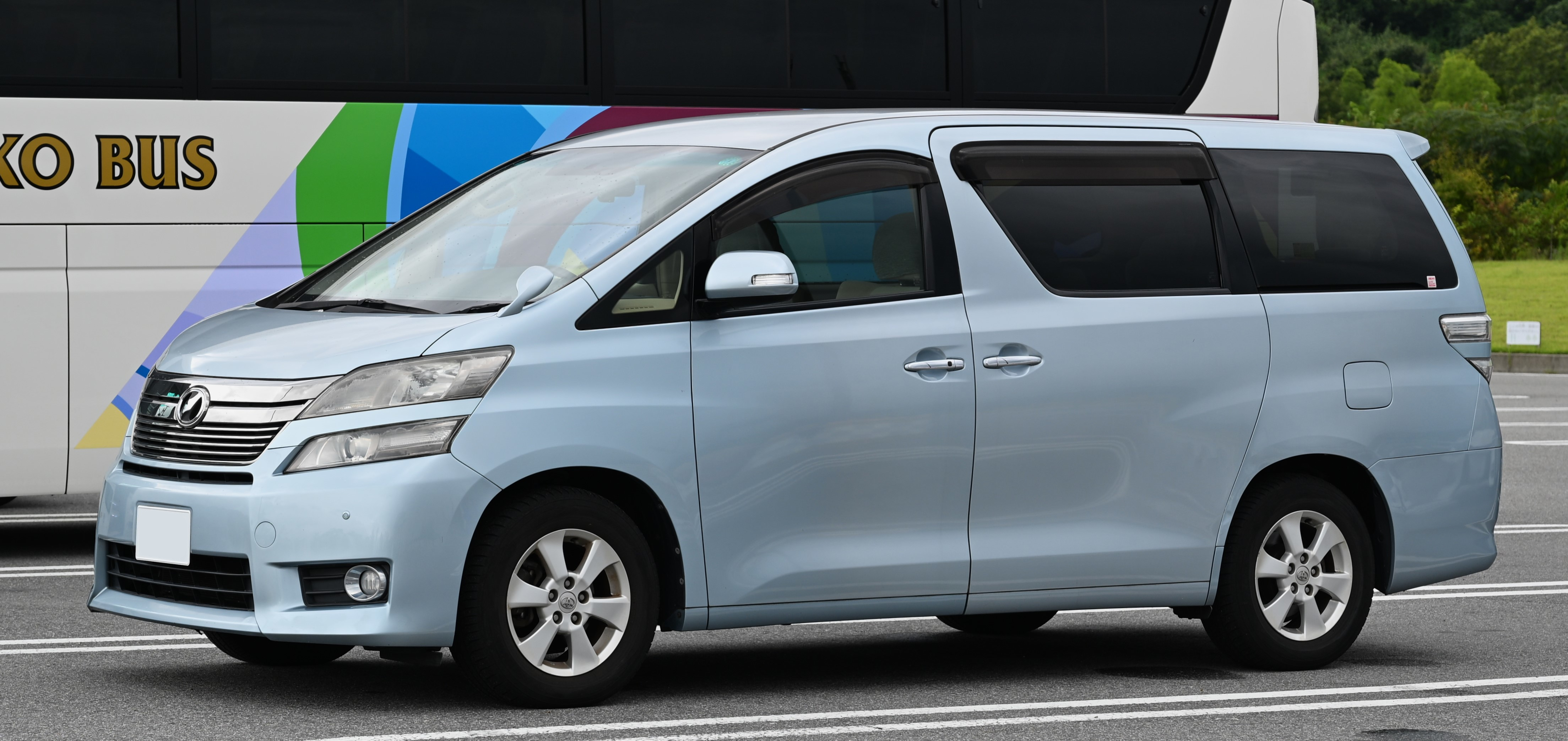
Vellfire (AH20W; facelift)

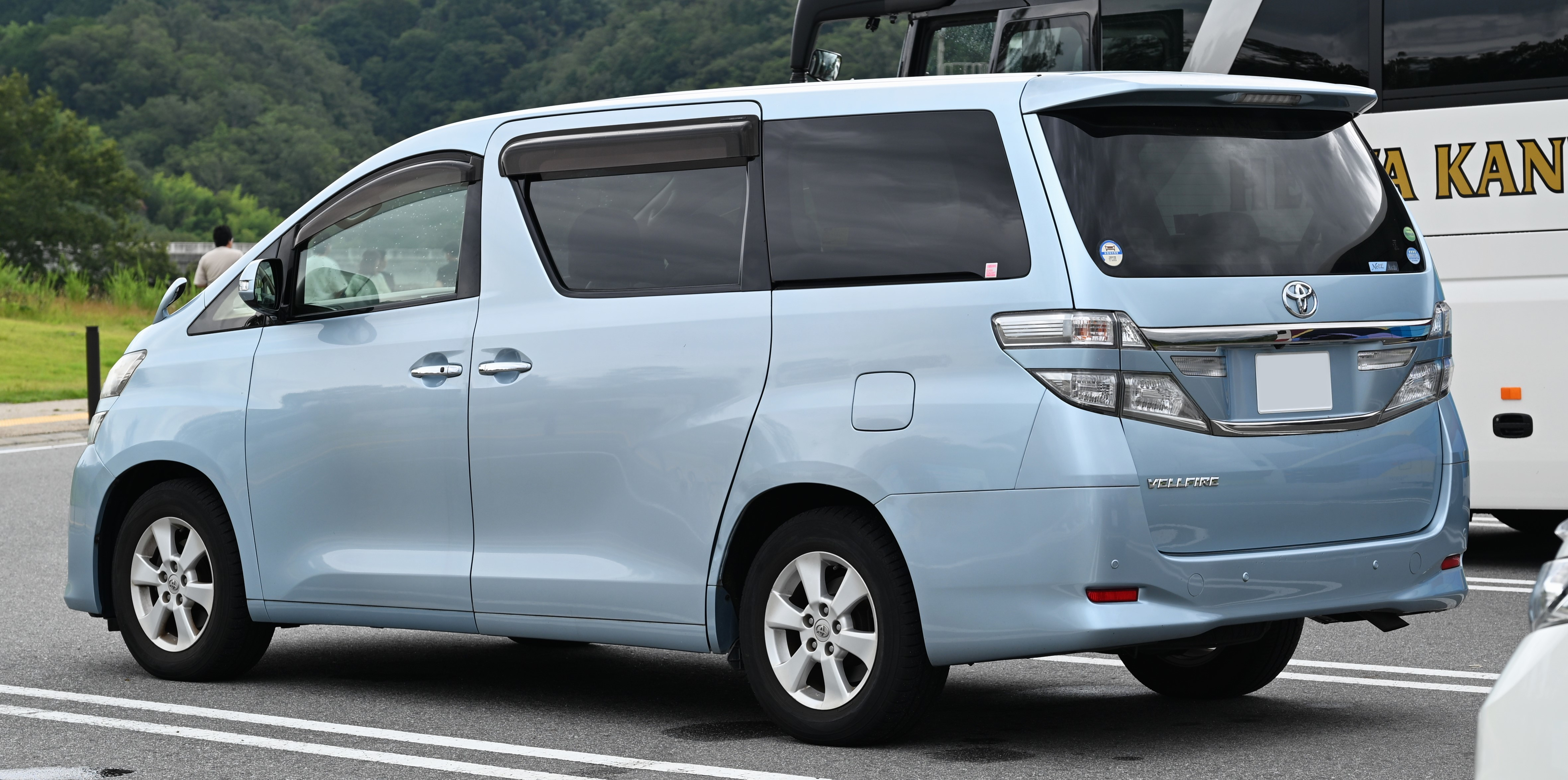
Vellfire (AH20W; facelift)

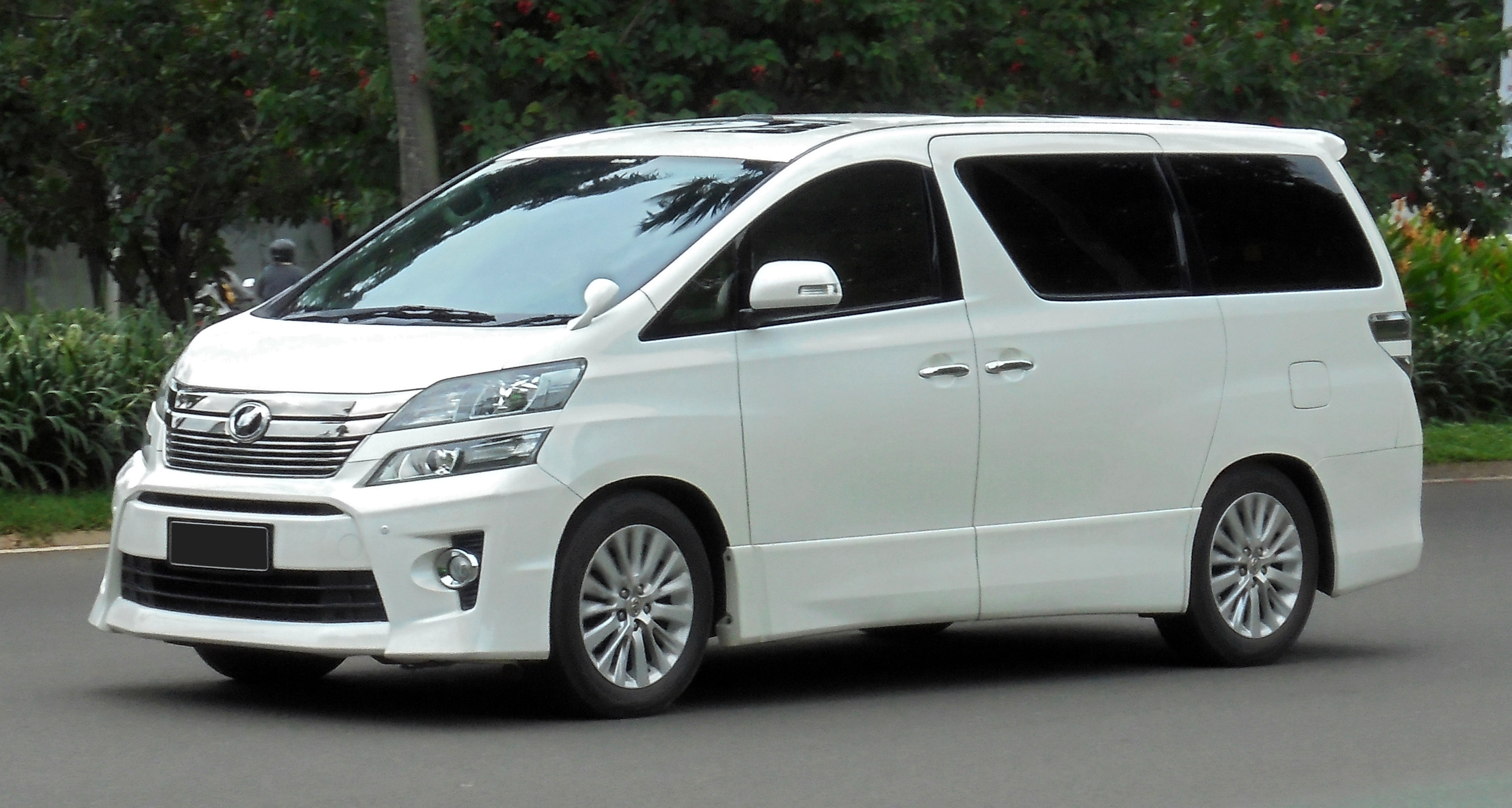
2012 Vellfire 2.4Z (ANH20W; facelift)

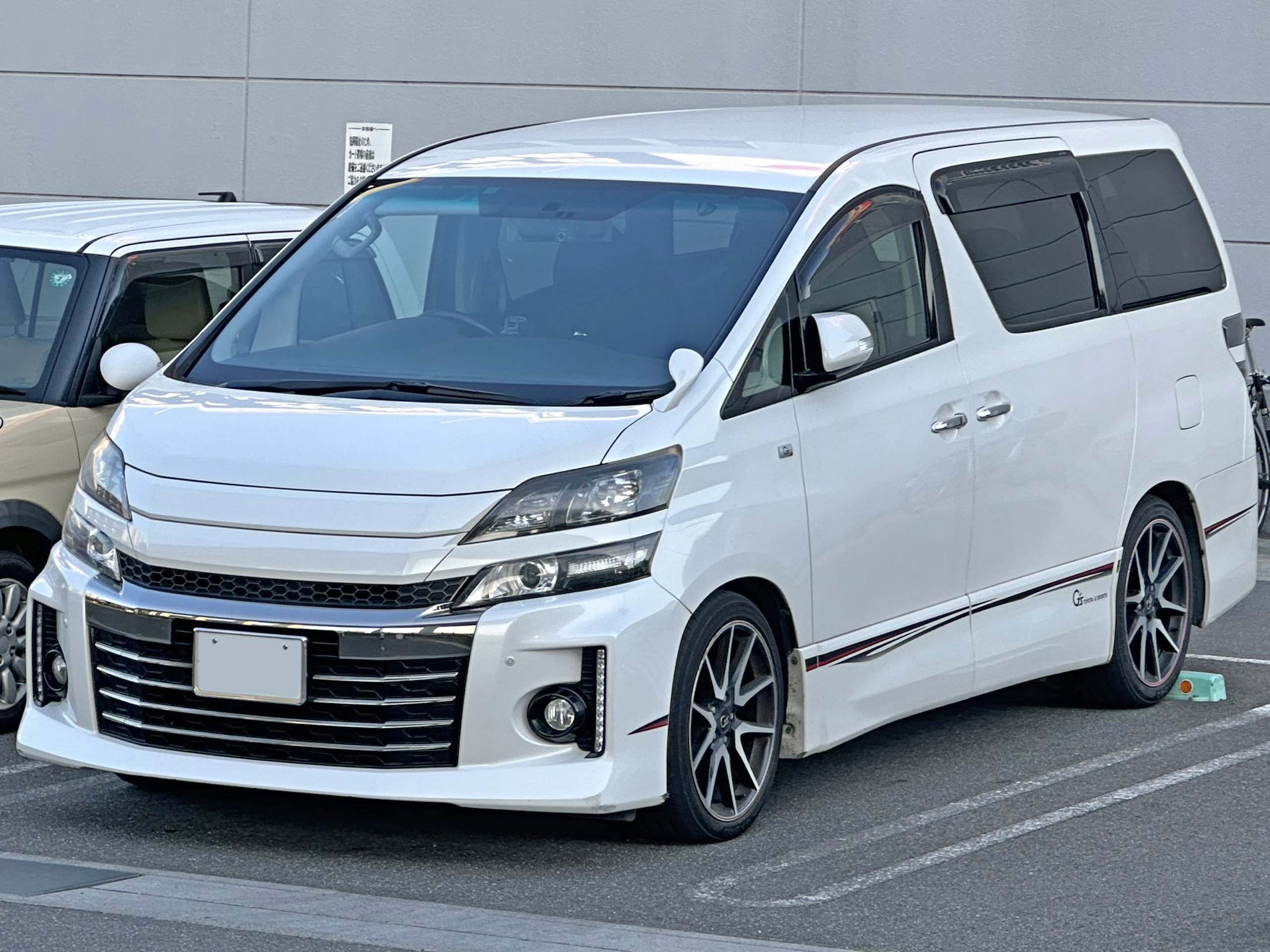
Vellfire 3.5 Z G's

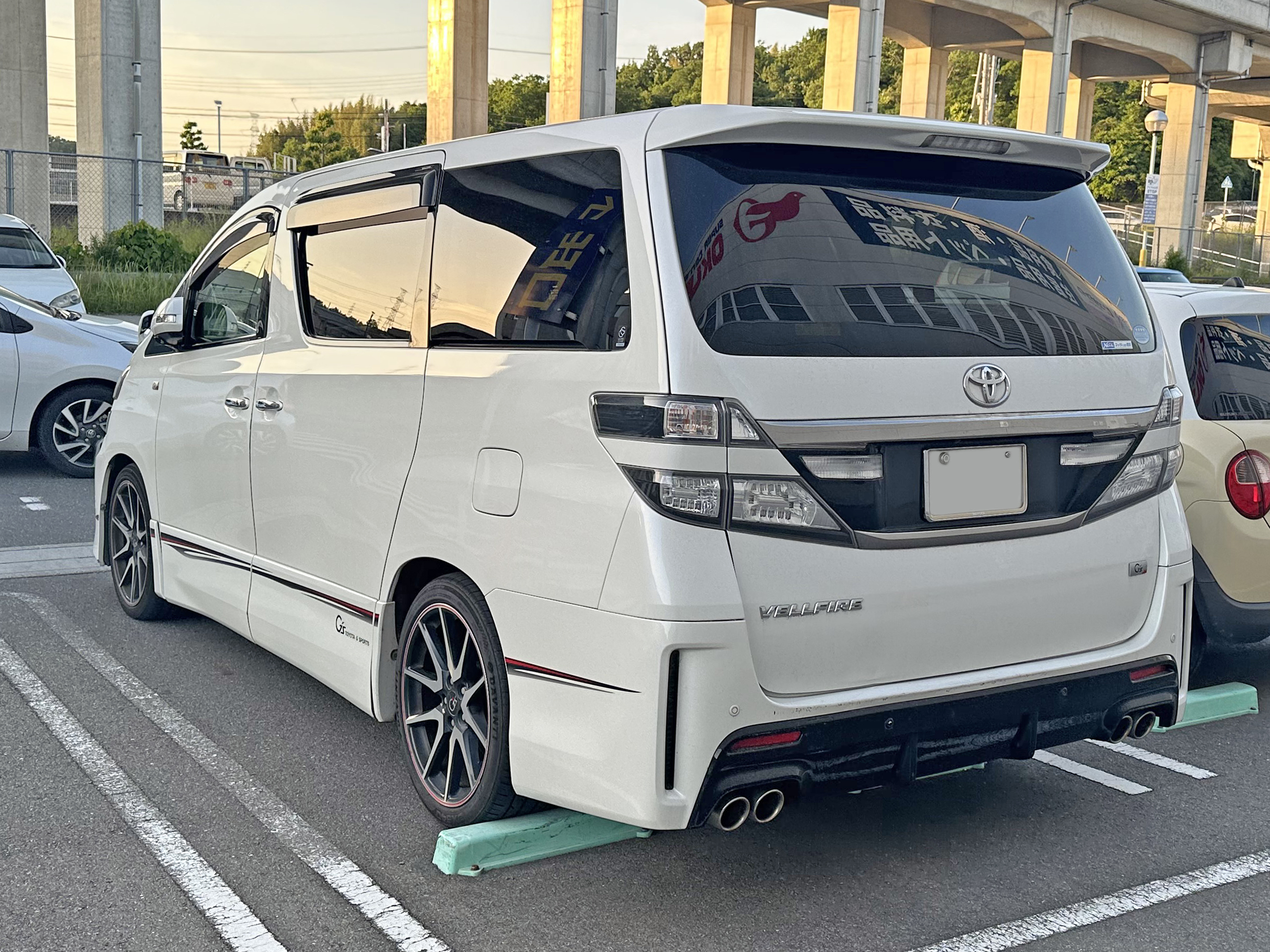
Vellfire 3.5 Z G's

=== Safety ===
JNCAP has rated the Alphard a full six stars for occupant crash safety and outstanding safety features. Safety features such as Anti-lock Braking System, Electronic Brakeforce Distribution, Brake Assist, Vehicle Stability Control and seven airbags (Dual front, Driver and passenger side airbags, Driver's knee and curtain airbags) are standard across all variants. Higher end variants offer a first-in-class Pre-Crash system as an option (only for Japanese models). Features include a radar-guided Adaptive Cruise Control, Lane Departure Warning with Lane Keep Assist and Pre-collision Warning with Semi-Autonomous Emergency Braking, which only helps apply a moderate amount of brake pressure, and does not completely stop the vehicle.

== Third generation (AH30; 2015) ==
Third generation
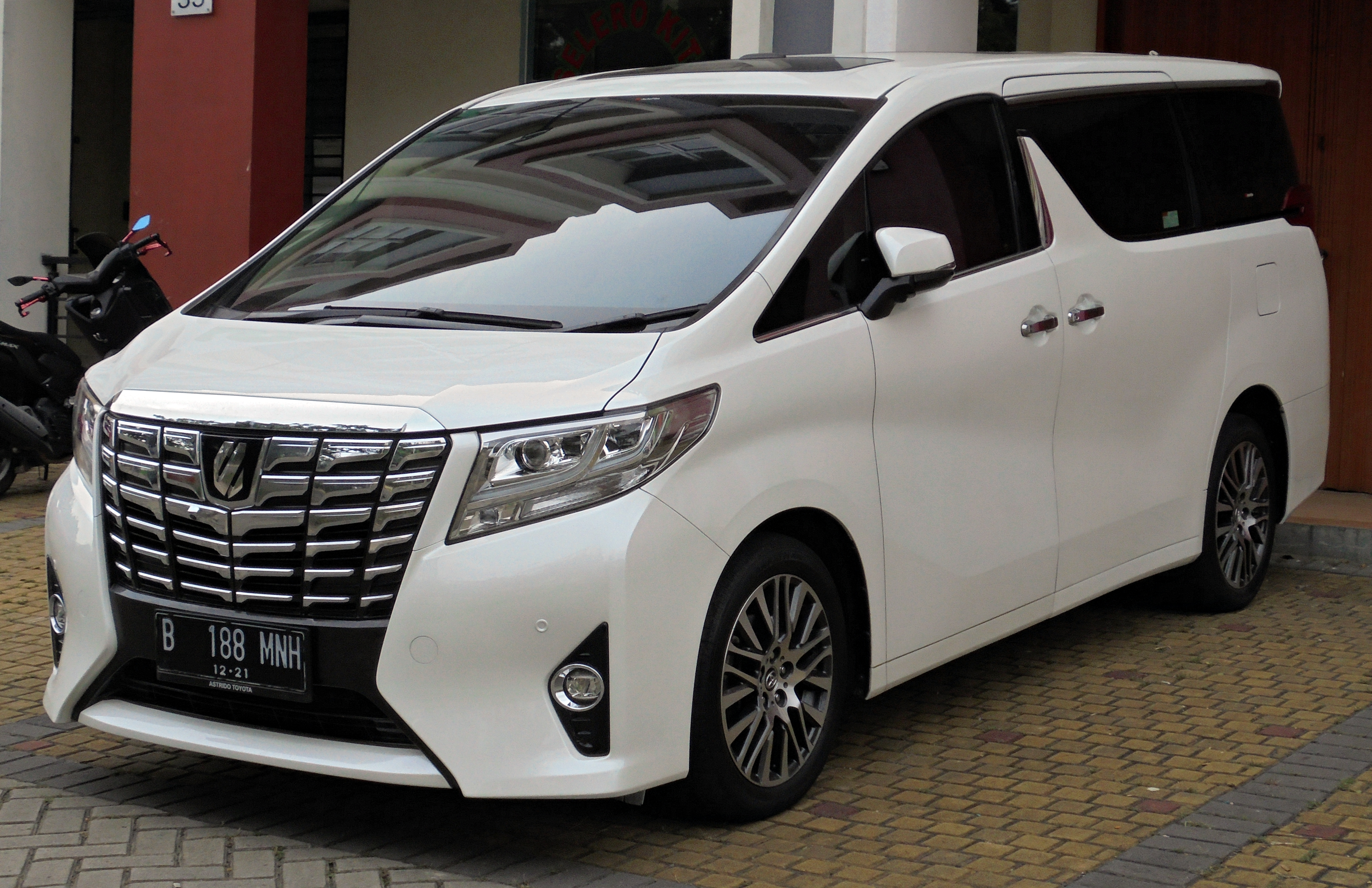
- 2016 Alphard 2.5 G (AGH30; pre-facelift, Indonesia)

Overview
- Model code: AH30
- Also called: Toyota Vellfire; Toyota Crown Vellfire (China, 2021–2023); Lexus LM (2019–2023)
- Production: 2015–2023
- Designer: Kenichi Yoshioka

Body and chassis
- Platform: Toyota New MC platform

Powertrain
- Engine: Petrol: 2.5 L 2AR-FE I4; 3.5 L 2GR-FE V6 (2015–2017; Hong Kong, 2018-2023); 3.5 L 2GR-FKS V6 (2018–2023); Petrol hybrid: 2.5 L 2AR-FXE I4
- Electric motor: 650 V permanent magnet synchronous motor: 105 kW (141 hp; 143 PS) 5NM + 50 kW (67 hp; 68 PS) 4NM (hybrid)
- Power output: 177 hp (132 kW; 179 PS) (2AR-FE); 270 hp (201 kW; 274 PS) (2GR-FE); 296 hp (221 kW; 300 PS) (2GR-FKS); 201 hp (150 kW; 204 PS) (2AR-FXE)
- Transmission: 6-speed ATF U660E automatic (2GR-FE); 7-speed super CVT-i automatic; 8-speed ATF UA80E automatic (2GR-FKS); e-CVT (hybrid)
- Hybrid drivetrain: Power-split
- Battery: 1.6 kWh nickel–metal hydride

Dimensions
- Wheelbase: 3,000 mm (118.1 in)
- Length: 4,915–4,945 mm (193.5–194.7 in)
- Width: 1,850 mm (72.8 in)
- Height: 1,880–1,950 mm (74.0–76.8 in)
- Curb weight: 1,920–2,220 kg (4,233–4,894 lb)

Toyota released the third-generation Alphard on 26 January 2015 with a completely redesigned exterior and 2 new engines, including a 2.5-litre 2AR-FE petrol engine and a 2.5-litre 2AR-FXE petrol-hybrid engine. The 3.5-litre 2GR-FE V6 along with the 6-speed automatic was carried over from the previous generation. A new top-of-the-line Executive Lounge grade was added for both the Alphard and Vellfire.

Toyota stated the vehicle was developed under the "luxury saloon with a large space" theme, to emphasize their focus on improving its ride comfort levels and styling. The length has grown by 60 mm (2.4 in), the width by 20 mm (0.8 in), and the wheelbase has grown longer by 50 mm (2.0 in); but the height is shorter by 10 mm (0.4 in) compared to the previous generation.

The platform of the third-generation Alphard was updated, featuring a newly developed double wishbone rear suspension to replace the previous torsion beam setup. The new suspension is chosen to maintain a quiet and rigid body. The floor of the new platform has been thoroughly flattened, and as a result, the second row seats is able to slide forward and backwards up to 1,160 mm (45.7 in).

The third-generation Alphard is available in Japan and selected Asian markets including Brunei, Indonesia, Thailand, Malaysia, Singapore, the Philippines and Hong Kong, being the first markets outside Japan to receive this all-new model. The third-generation Alphard was introduced in Russia, the model's primary, and only European market, but only with the 3.5-litre V6 engine. The V6 model is also available in other left-hand drive markets, like China and Taiwan. In India, the Vellfire has been offered since February 2020 as the brand's only import model in the country with the 2.5-litre hybrid engine.

Alphard

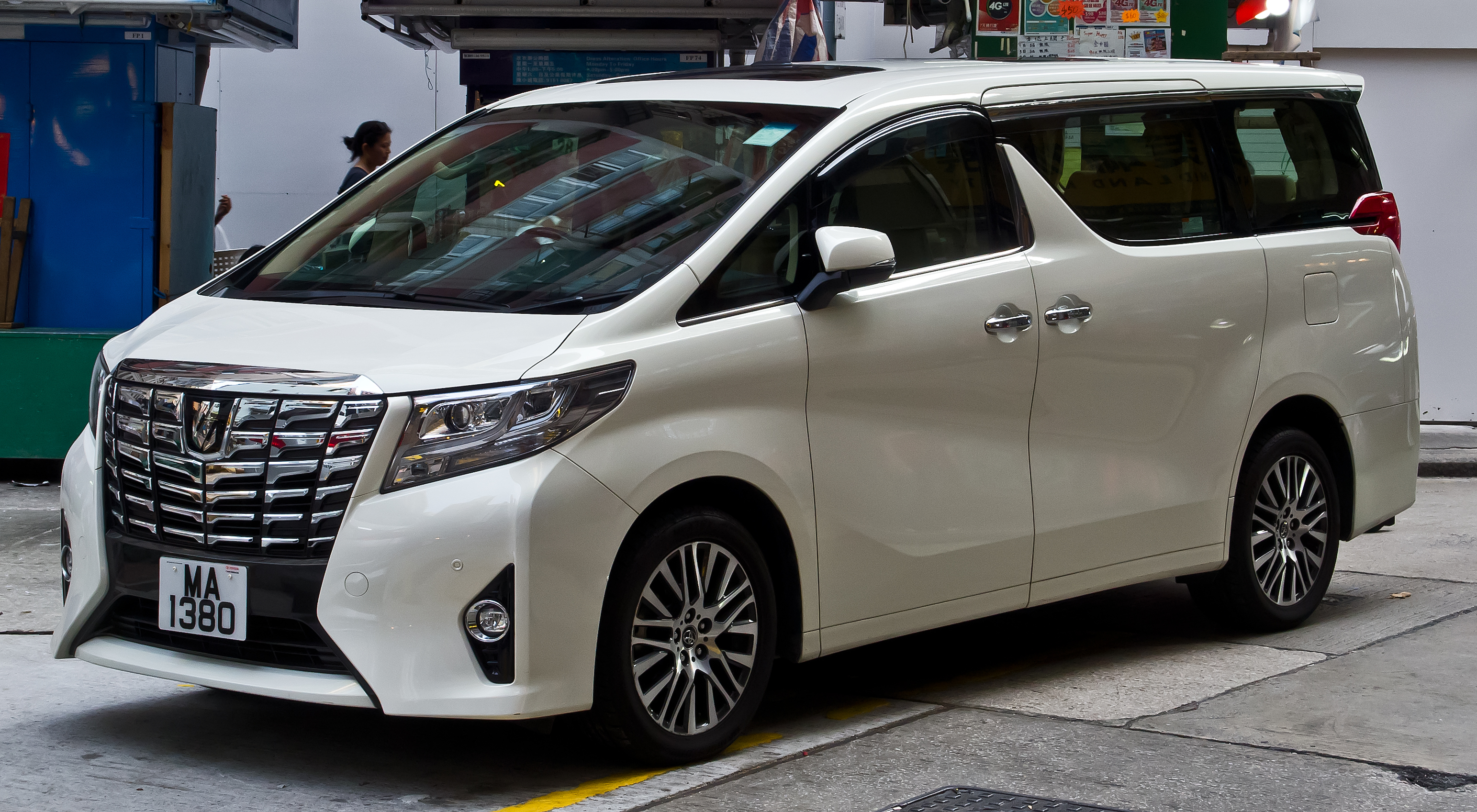
Alphard 350 V6 (GGH30W; pre-facelift, Hong Kong)

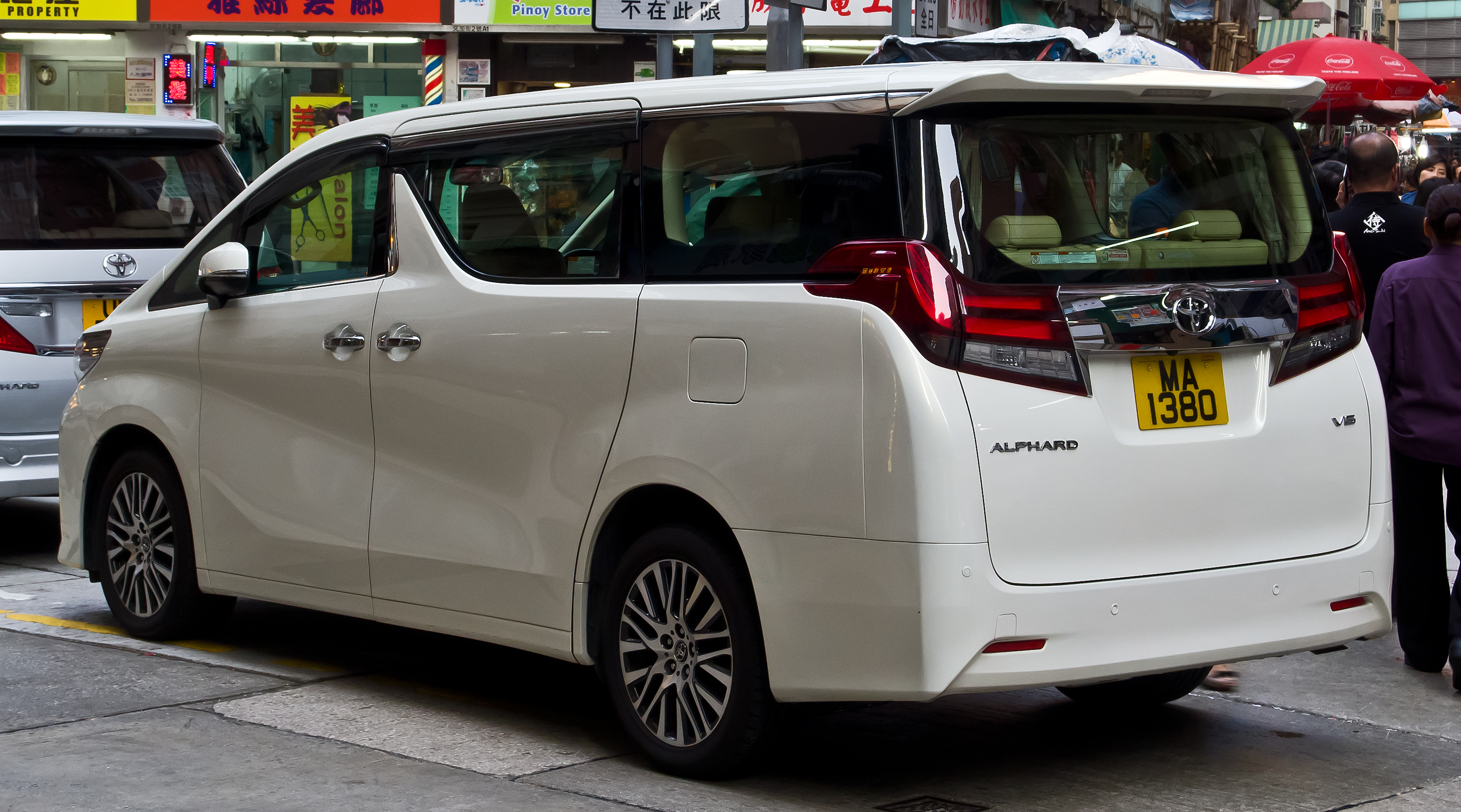
Alphard 350 V6 (GGH30W; pre-facelift, Hong Kong)

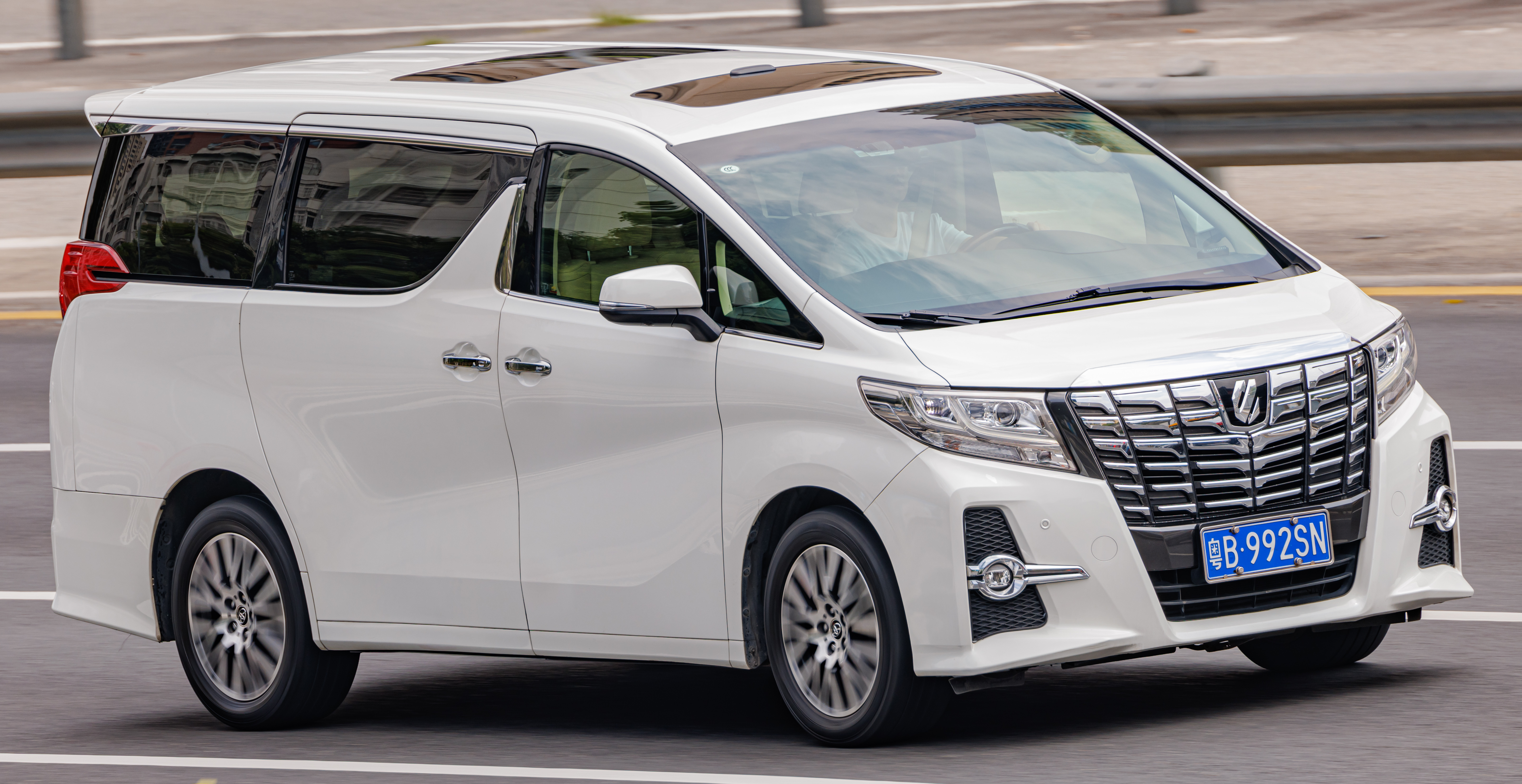
Alphard SA (GGH30W; pre-facelift, China)

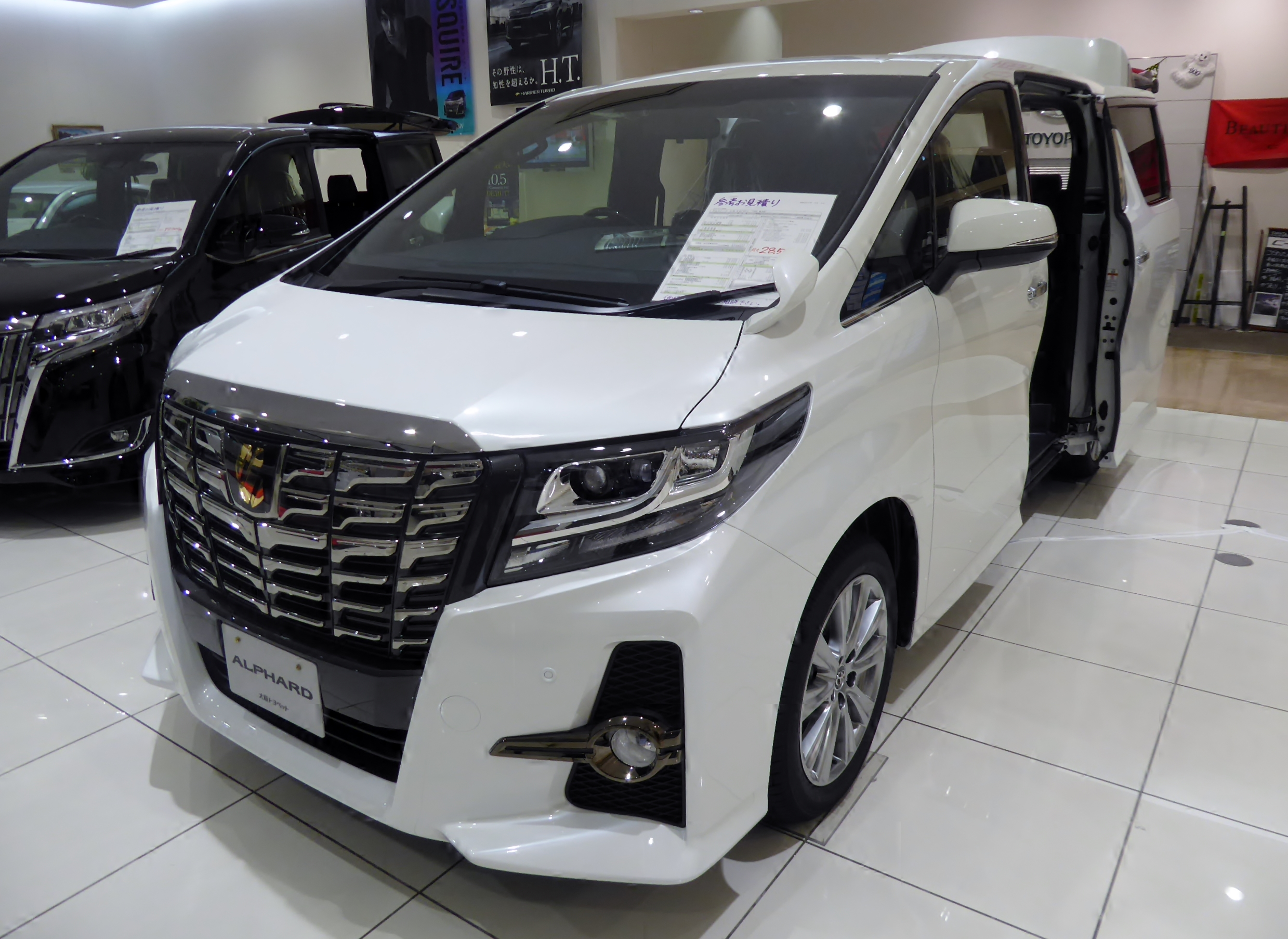
Alphard SA (GGH30W; pre-facelift, Japan)

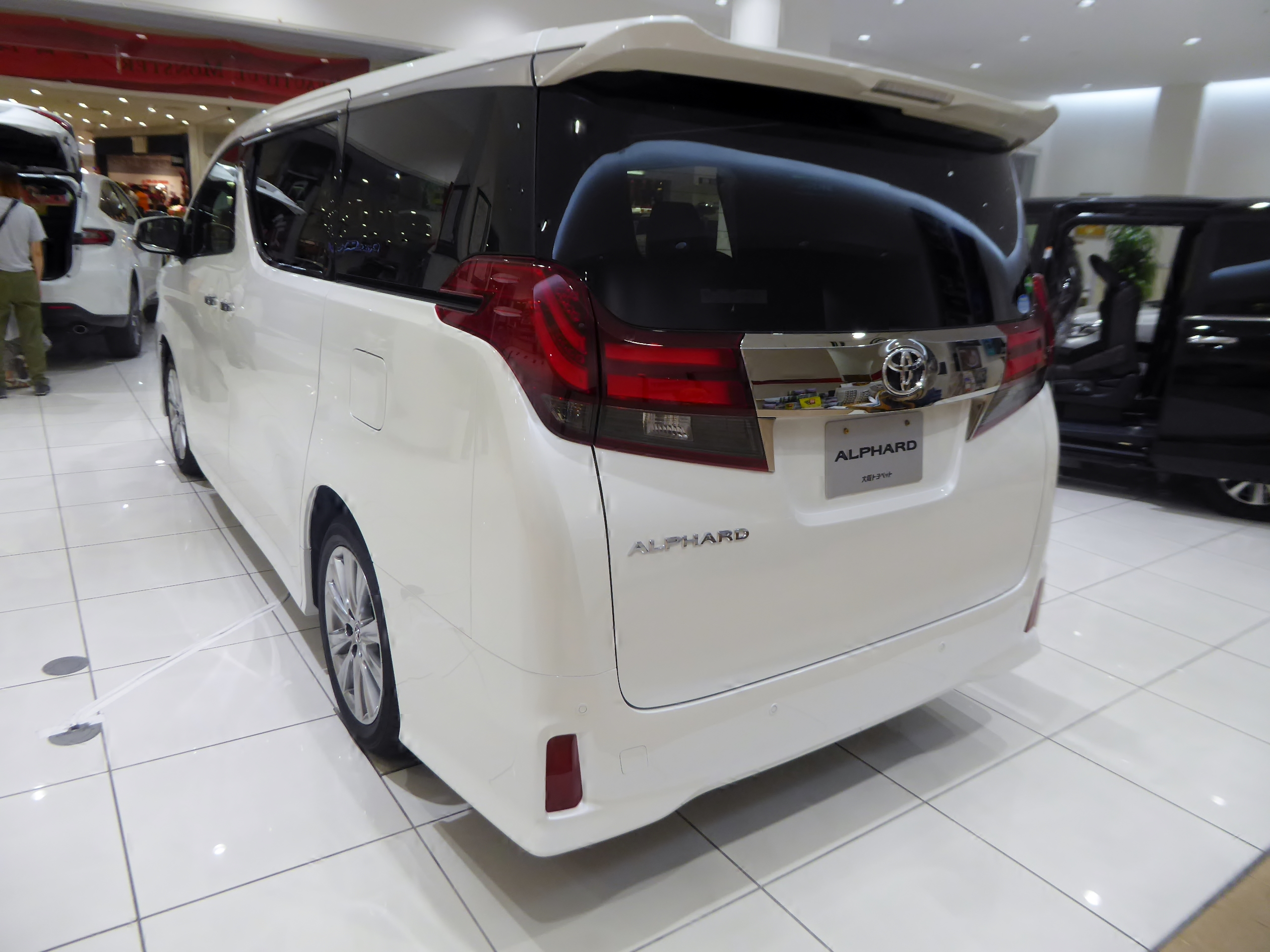
Alphard SA (GGH30W; pre-facelift, Japan)

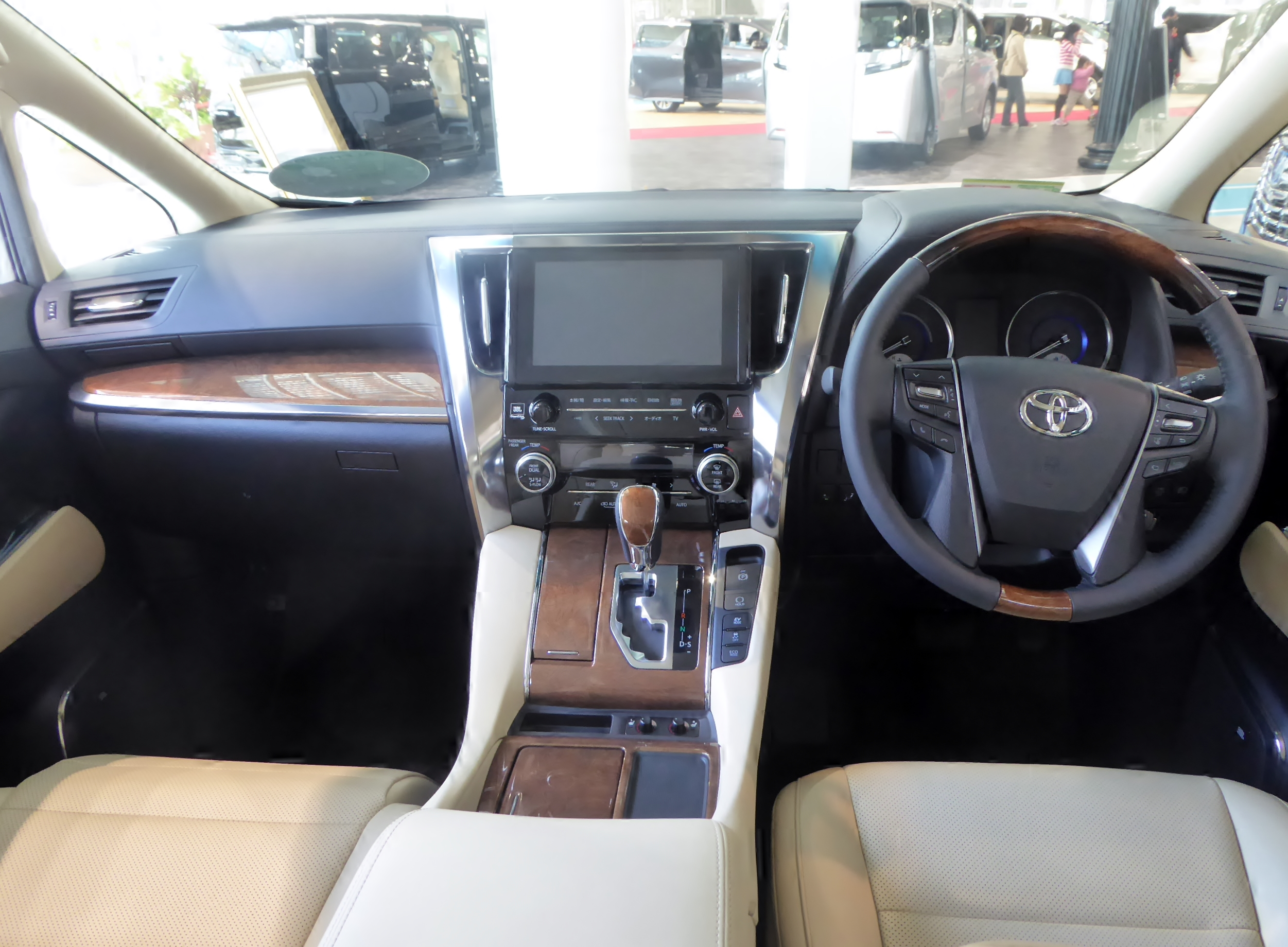
Alphard Hybrid interior (pre-facelift)

Vellfire

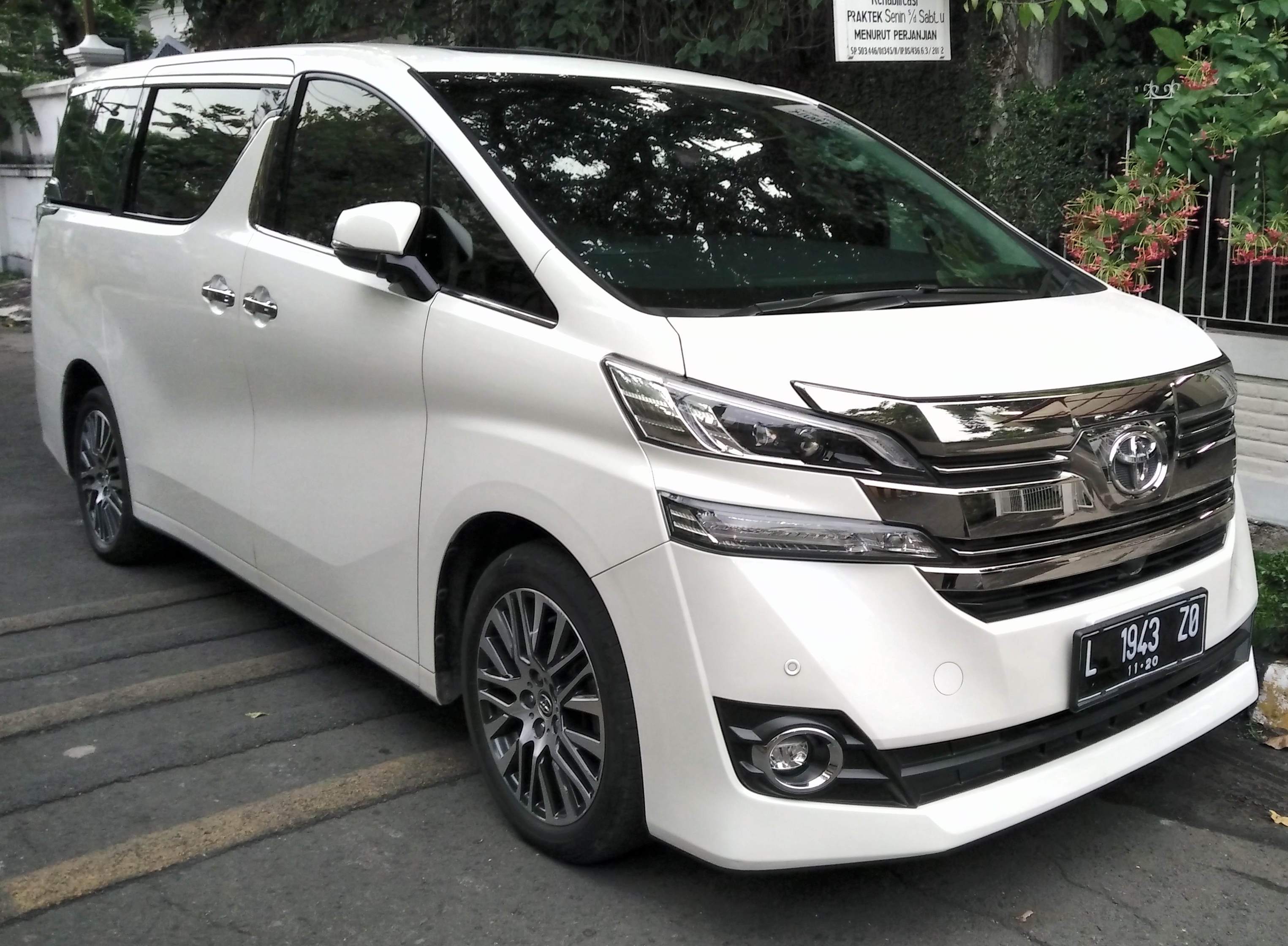
2015 Vellfire 2.5 G (AGH30; pre-facelift, Indonesia)

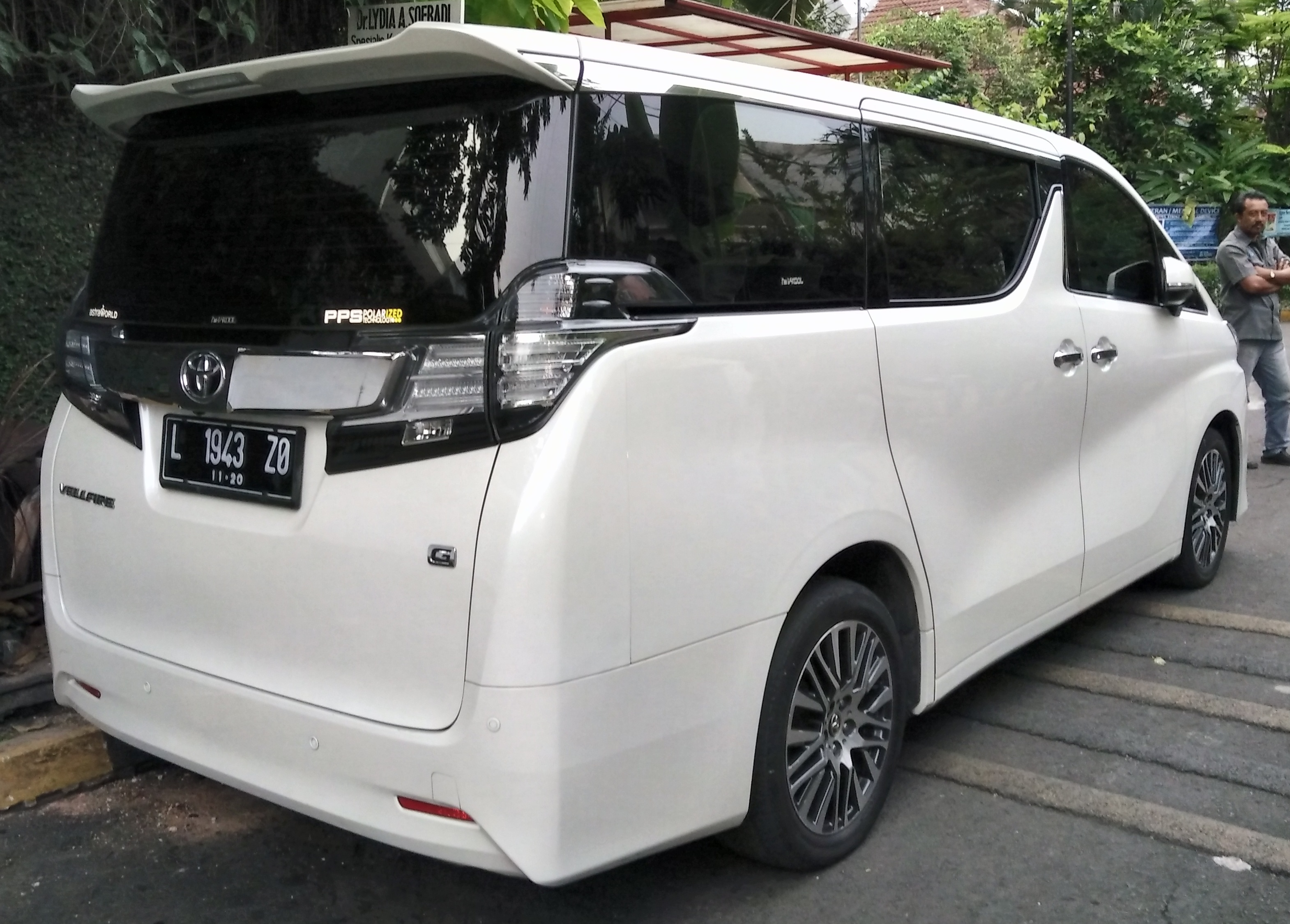
2015 Vellfire 2.5 G (AGH30; pre-facelift, Indonesia)

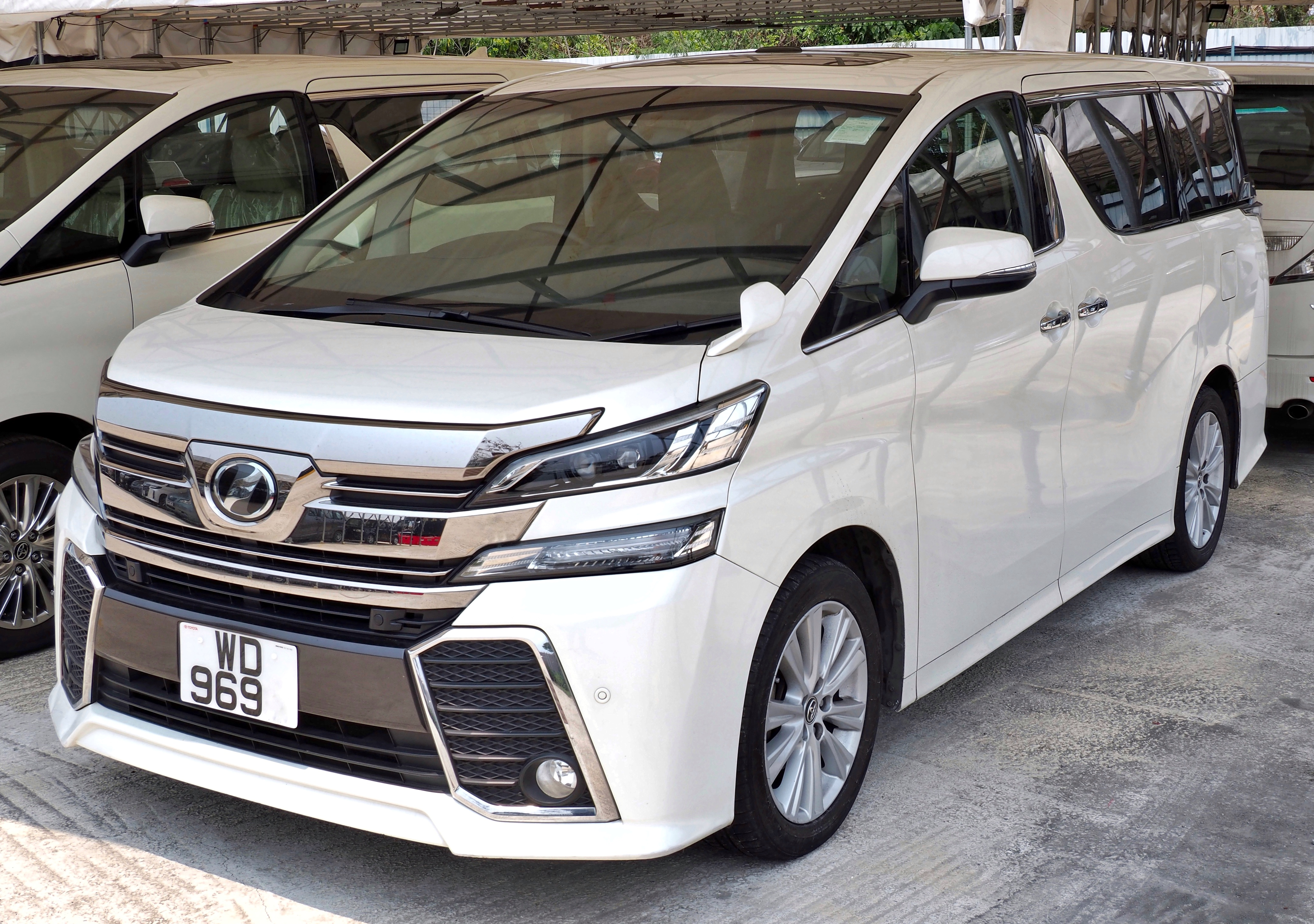
2015 Vellfire ZA (AH30W; pre-facelift, Hong Kong)

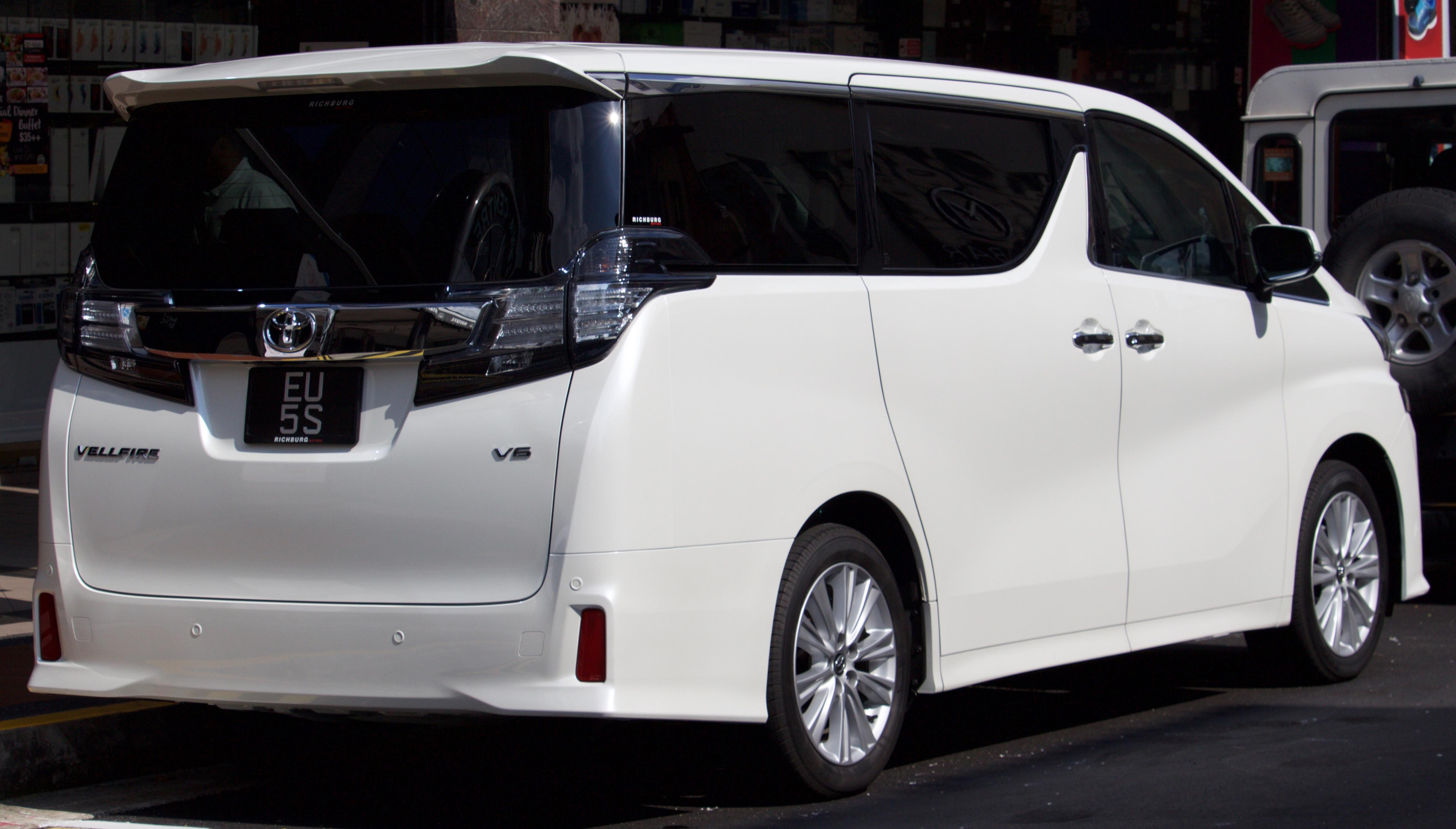
2015 Vellfire ZA (GGH30W; pre-facelift, Singapore)

=== 2018 facelift ===
The facelifted third generation Alphard and second generation Vellfire were unveiled on 25 December 2017 and released on 8 January 2018. Most of the changes are only to the exterior and powertrain, whereas interior equipment remains largely similar with minor changes. New trapezoidal taillights replace the horizontal ones on the Vellfire, mimicking the design of the second generation's taillights. The Alphard gets slimmer LED headlights and a larger grille up front. Both models can be optioned with sequential blinkers. Also new is an updated V6 engine, the 2GR-FKS that replaces the outgoing 2GR-FE (except for Hong Kong, due to the emission rules). Output has increased to 300 PS (221 kW; 296 hp) and 362 N⋅m (267 lbf⋅ft). Also new is a Direct-Shift 8-speed automatic, that replaces the 6-speed Super ECT that is only found in V6-powered variants. Accelerating from 0–100 km/h (0–62 mph) can be achieved in 7.5 seconds. The debut of the second generation Toyota Safety Sense system is launched with the facelifted Alphard and Vellfire, which became standard equipment across all variants.

On 1 May 2020, the Alphard and Vellfire became available at all Toyota dealership sales channels in Japan (Toyota Store, Toyopet Store, Corolla Store and Netz), and the Netz logo emblem on the Vellfire's front grille was replaced by the Toyota logo emblem.

In April 2021, trim levels for the Vellfire in Japan were reduced to one special edition trim, Golden Eyes II, due to decreasing sales as the result of the dealership line-up unification in 2020.

In the same month, the Vellfire in China was renamed to Toyota Crown Vellfire (simplified Chinese: 皇冠威尔法; traditional Chinese: 皇冠威爾法; pinyin: Huángguàn Wēiěrfǎ), with the inclusion of the Crown logo replacing the front Toyota logo, and in other places such as the hubcaps and instrument cluster.

In June 2022, orders of the AH30 Alphard and Vellfire were suspended, and production ended, resulting in the MPVs being unavailable for brand new purchase for a year. As a result, when the AH40 Alphard and Vellfire launched in June 2023, demand for the new MPVs was huge, forcing orders to be suspended in late 2023 when the wait time for delivery of the models extended to a year.

Alphard

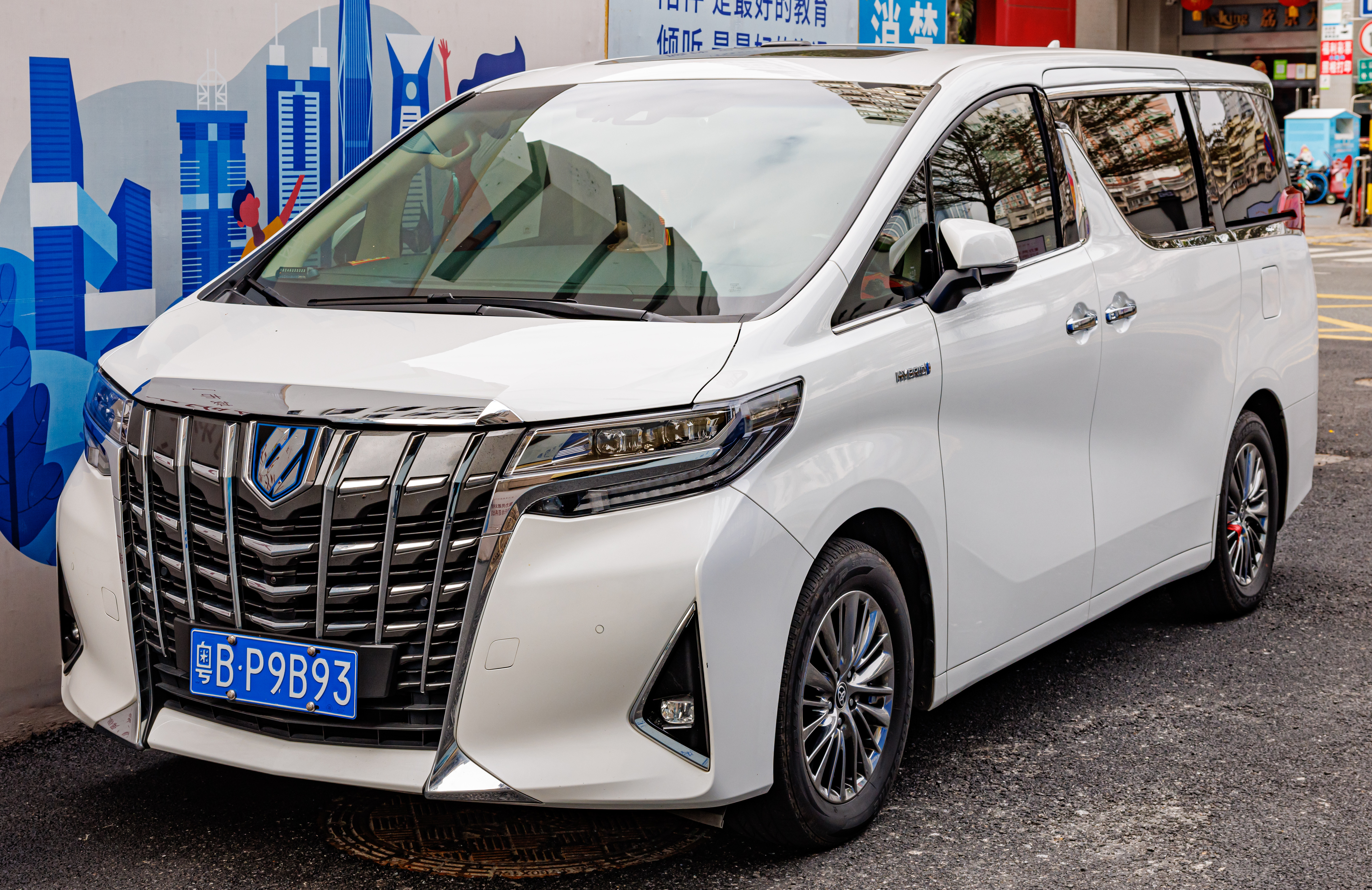
Alphard Hybrid (AYH30W; facelift, China)

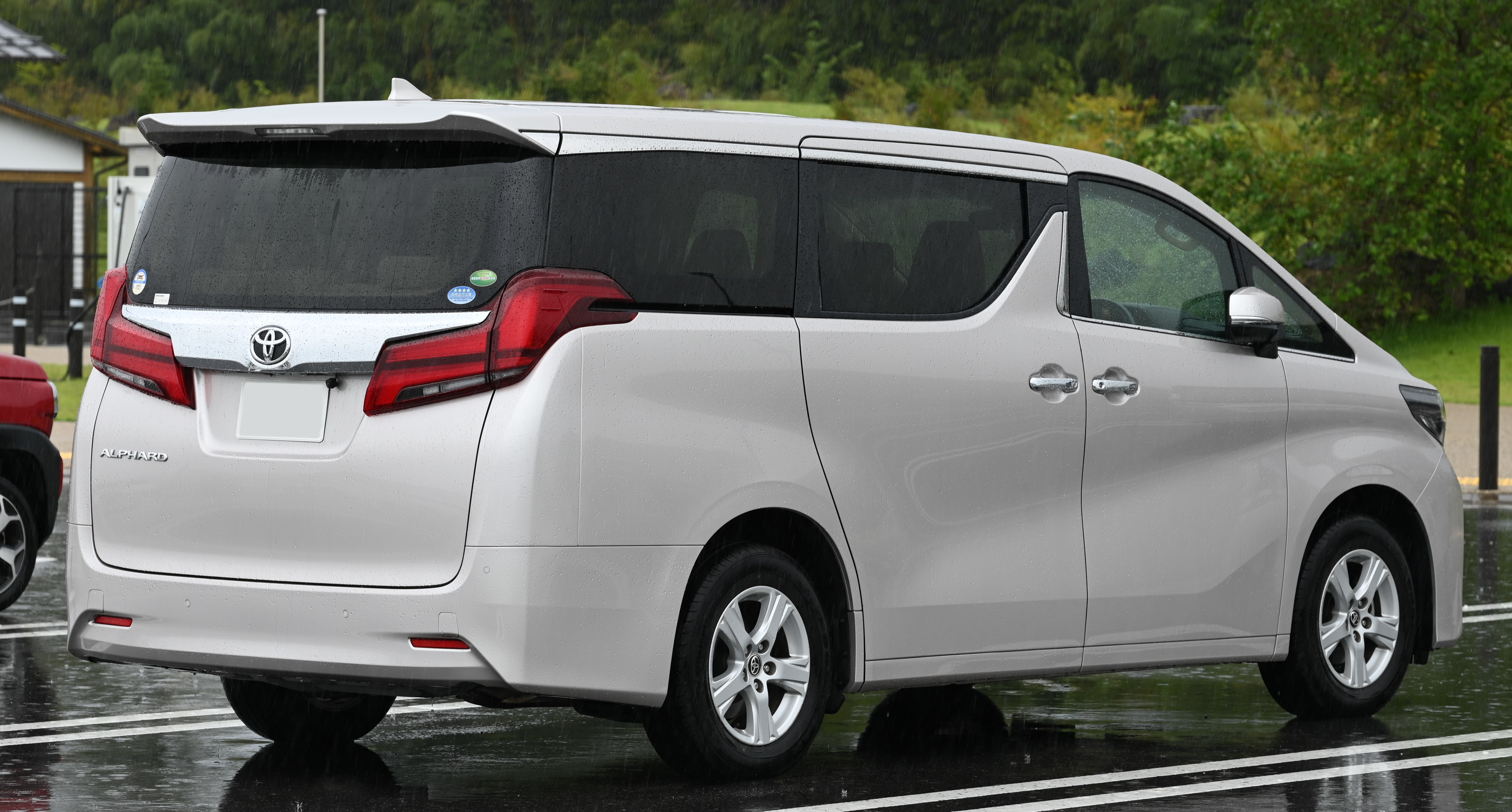
Alphard X (AGH30; facelift, Japan)

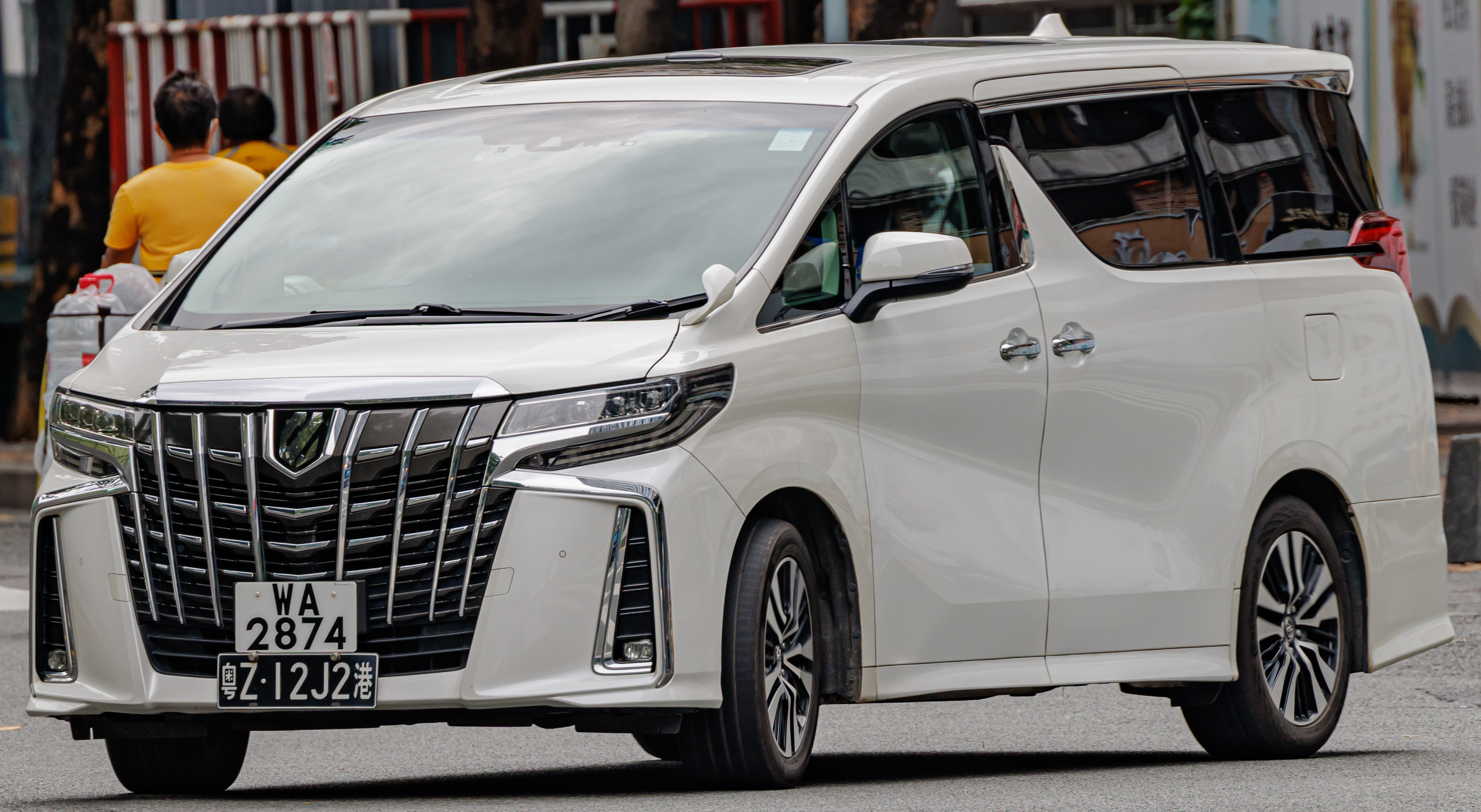
Alphard SC (GGH30W; facelift, Hong Kong)

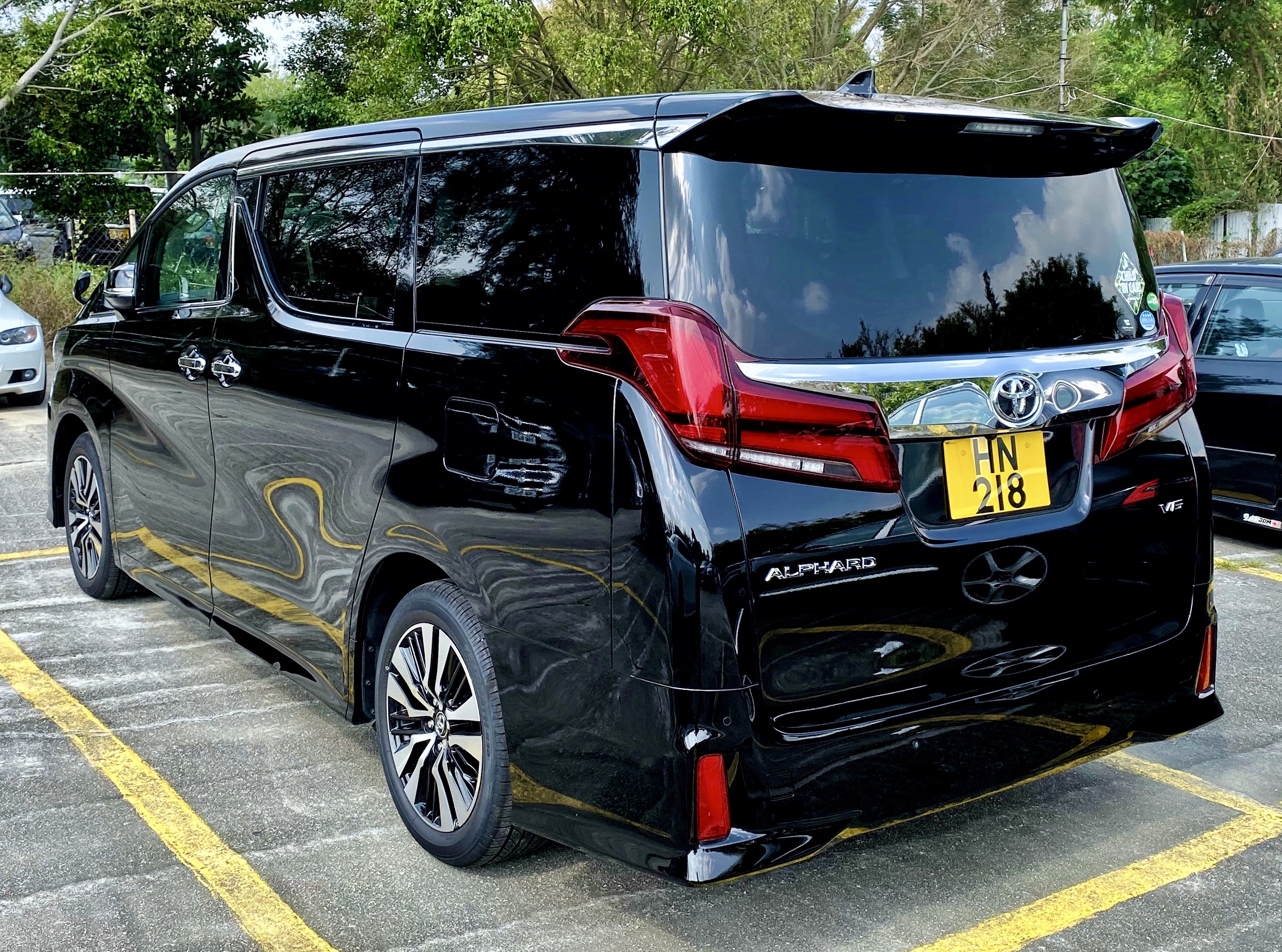
2018 Alphard SC (GGH30W; facelift, Hong Kong)

Vellfire

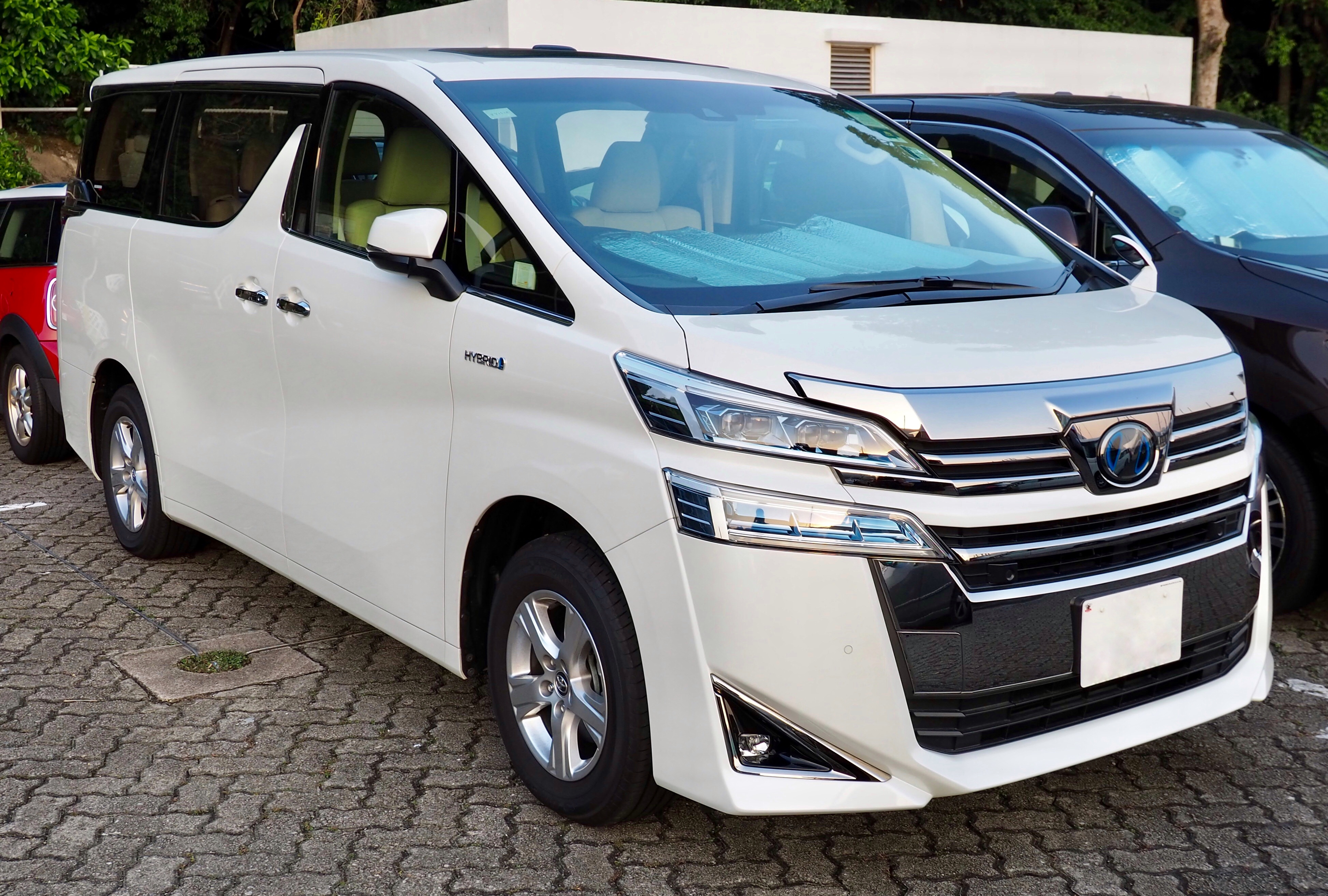
2019 Vellfire Hybrid X (AYH30W; facelift, Hong Kong)

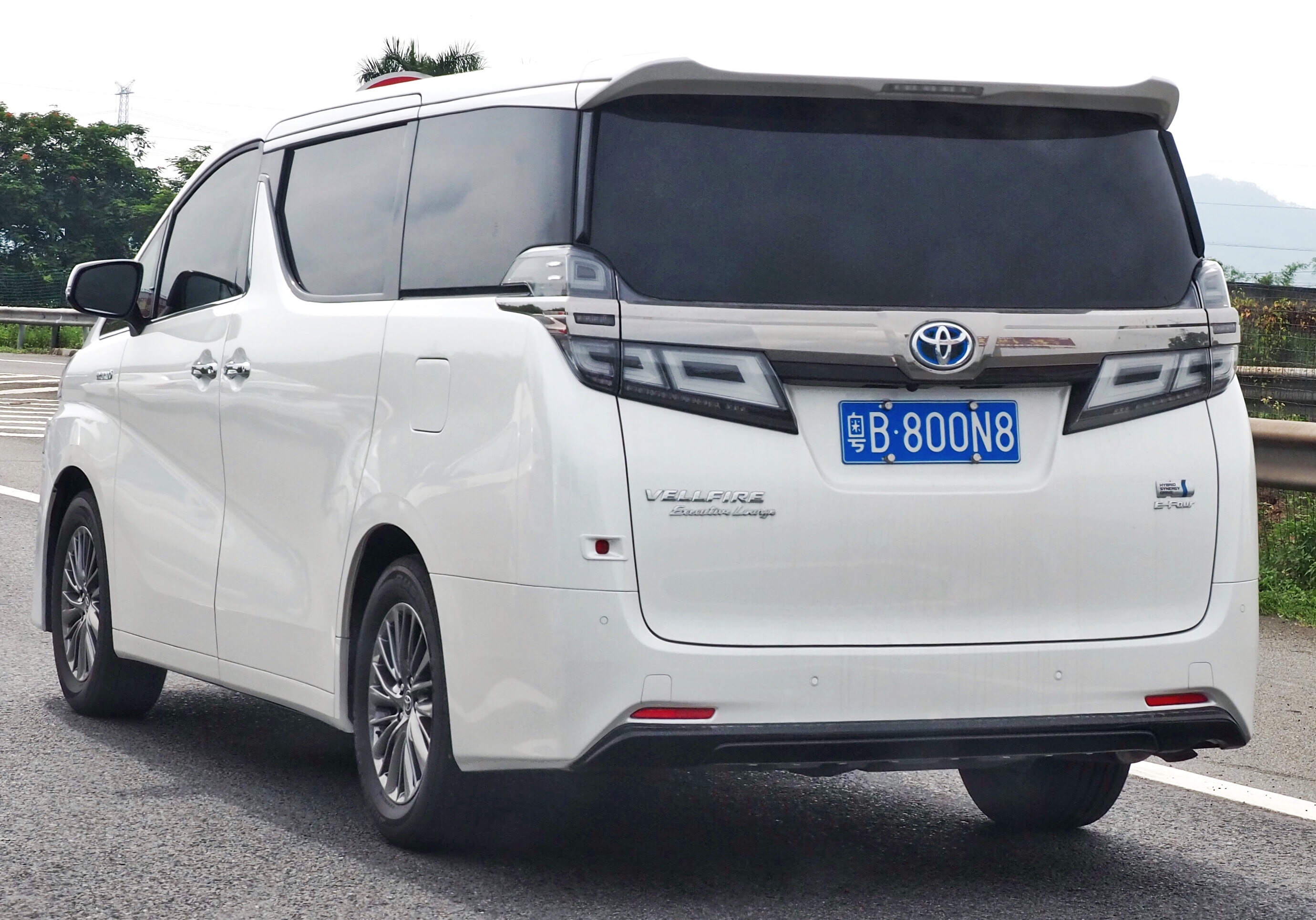
2018 Vellfire Hybrid Executive Lounge (AYH30W; facelift, China)

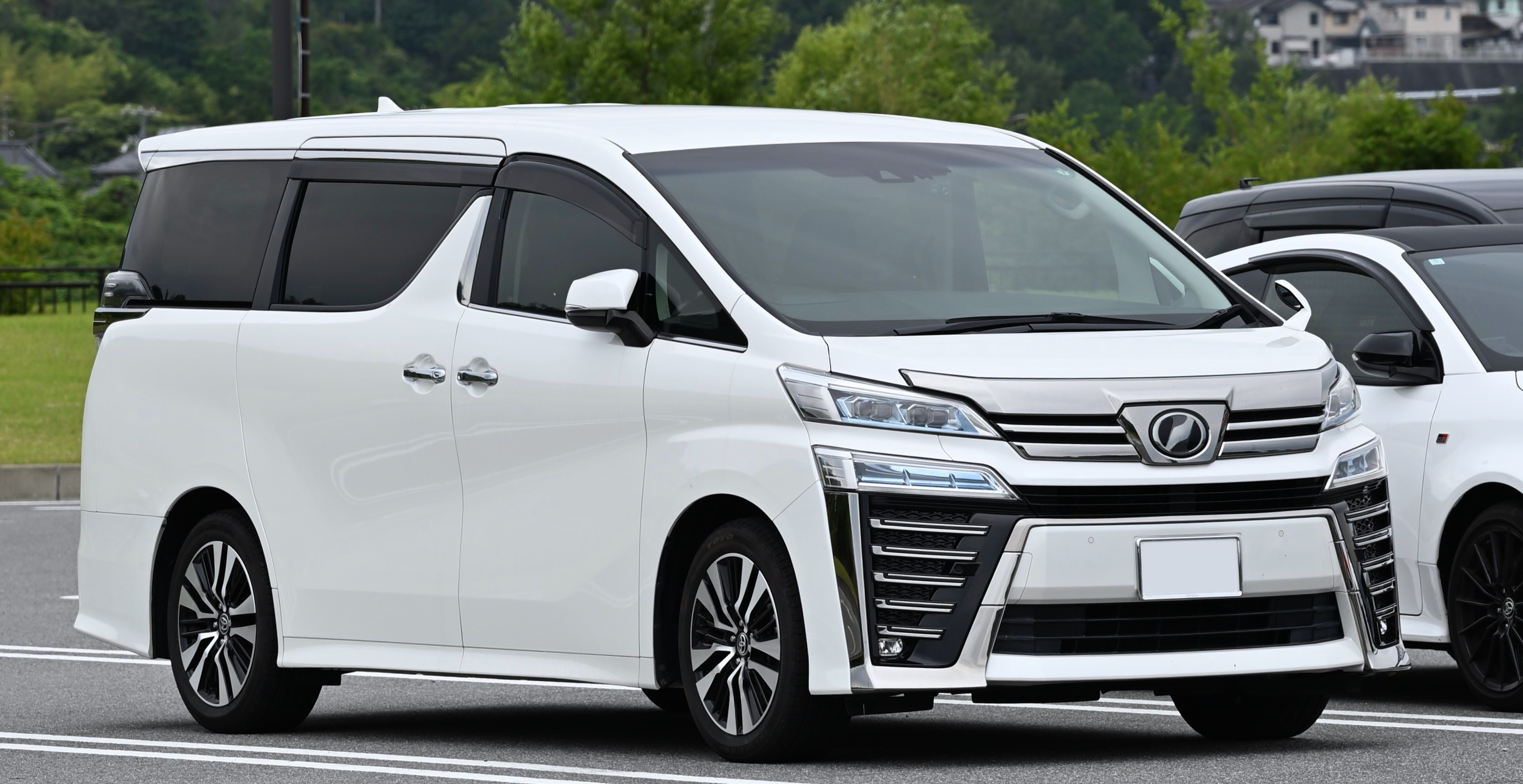
2018–2019 Vellfire Z "G Edition" (AGH30W; facelift, Japan)

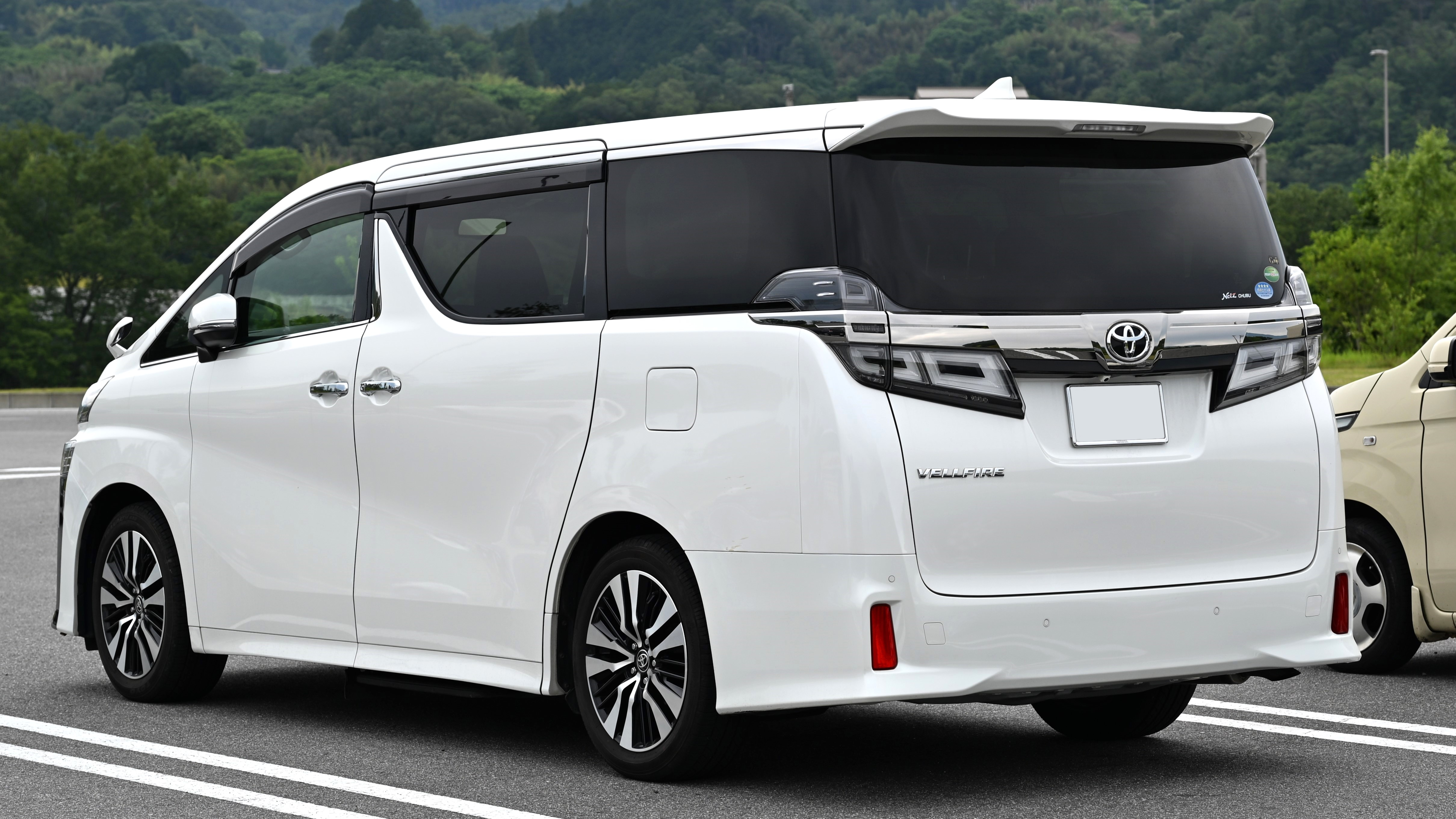
2018–2019 Vellfire Z "G Edition" (AGH30W; facelift, Japan)

Crown Vellfire

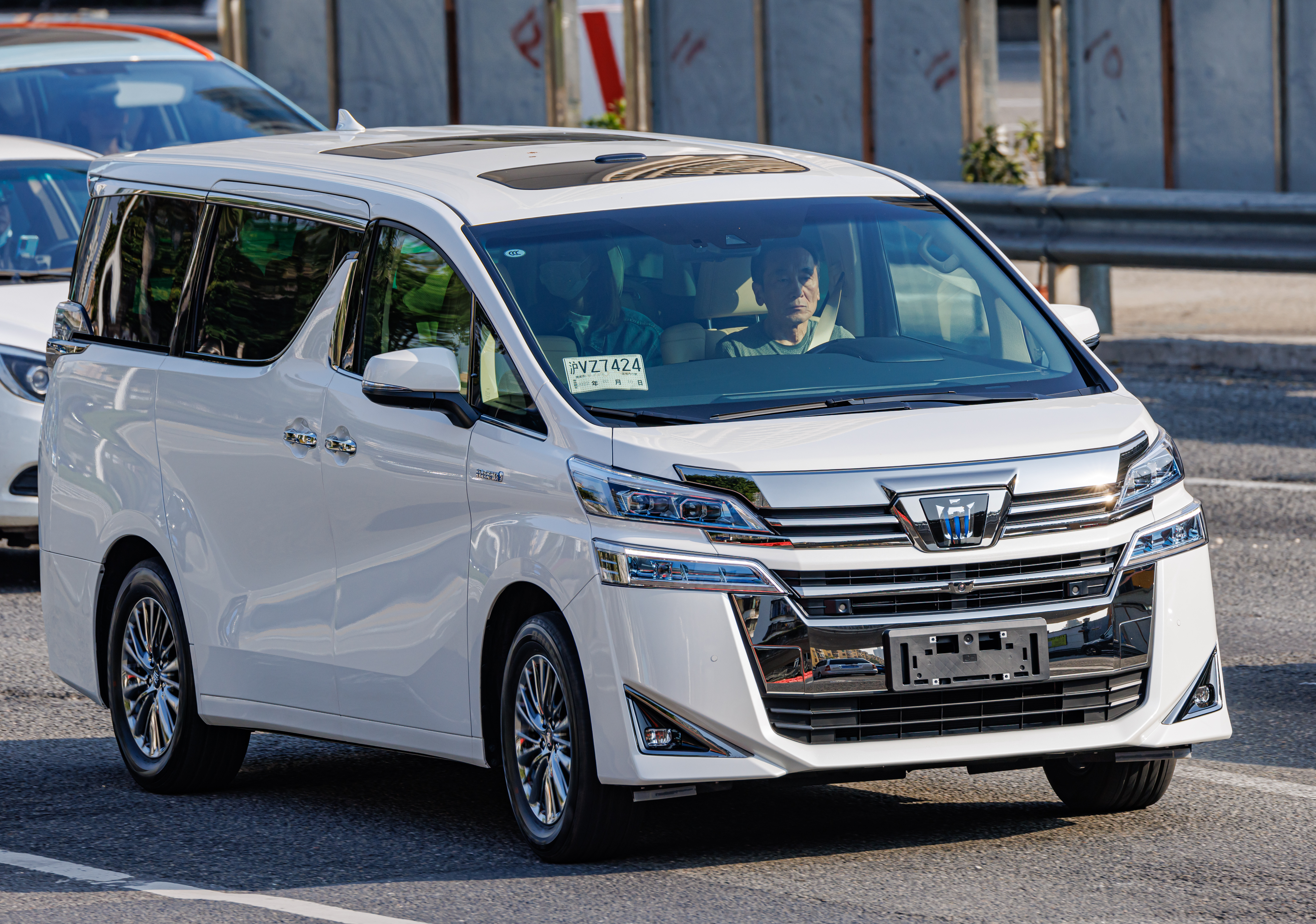
Toyota Crown Vellfire (China)

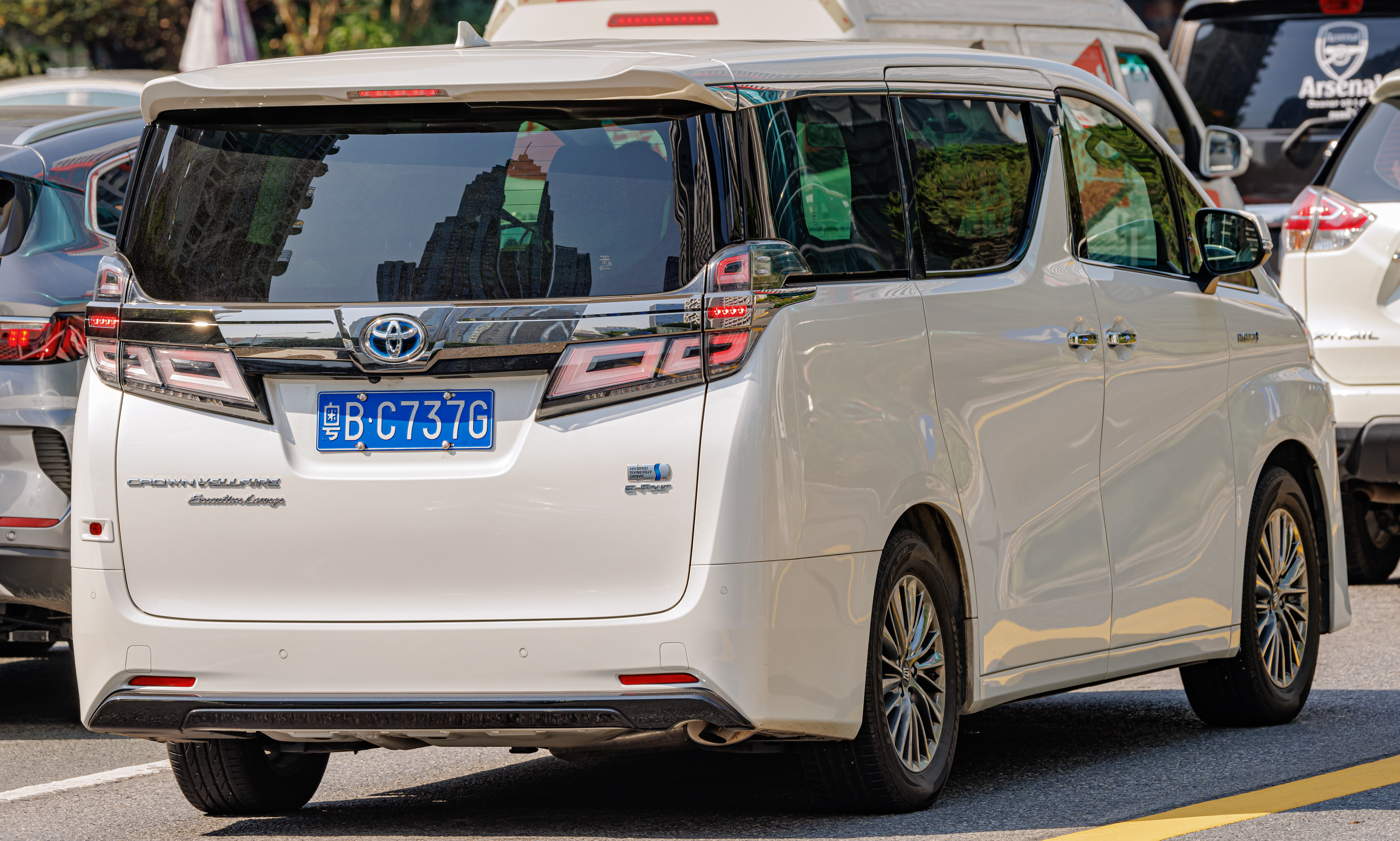
Rear view (Crown Vellfire)

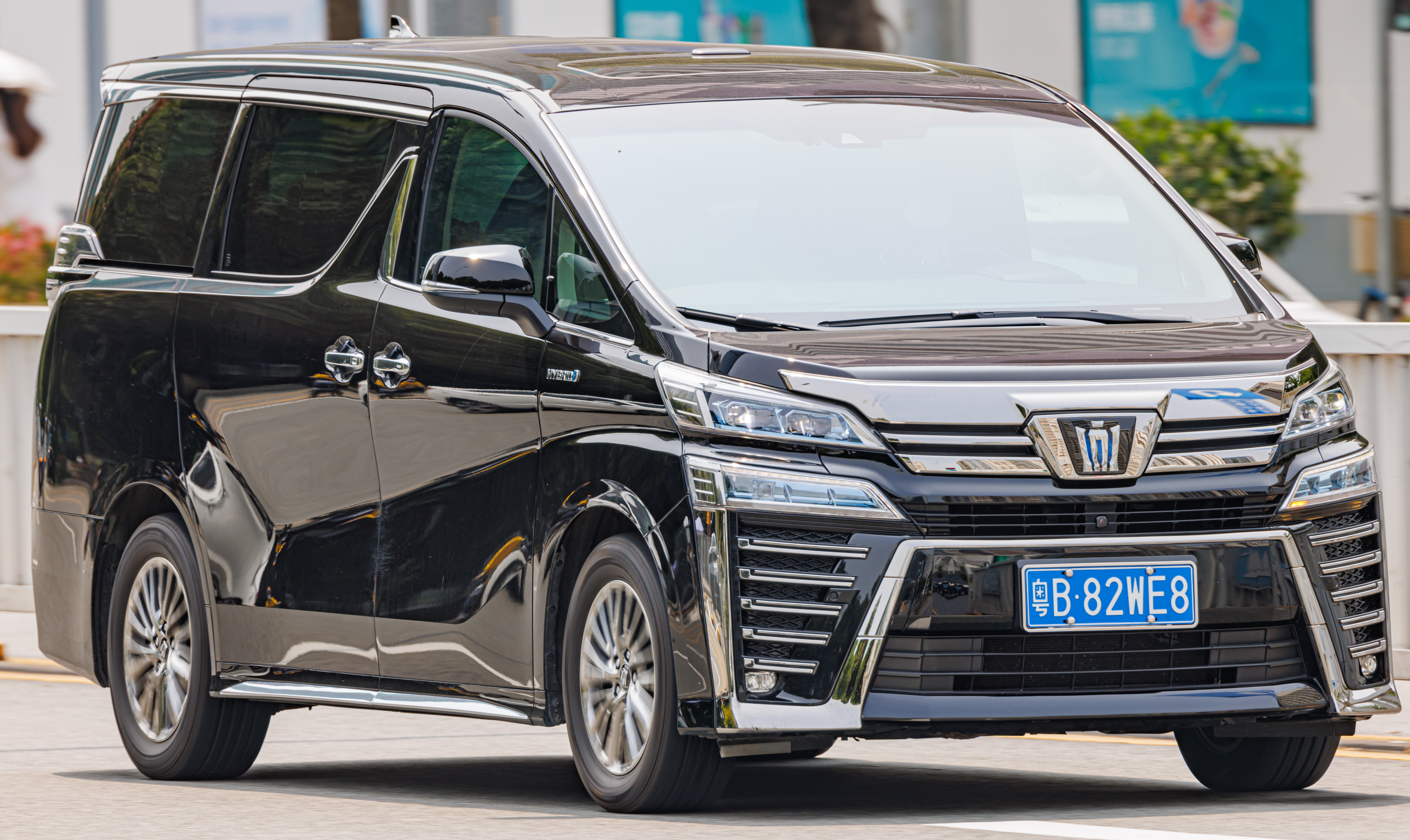
Crown Vellfire Aero (China)

=== Lexus LM ===
The Lexus-badged version of the third generation Alphard, called the Lexus LM, was unveiled on 16 April 2019 at the 18th Shanghai International Automobile Industry Exhibition and first released on 20 February 2020 in China. The LM designation stands for "Luxury Mover". The LM is slightly longer than the Alphard it is based on, measuring in at 5,040 mm (198.4 in) long, and fitted with a new suspension setup. The LM is available in two seating configurations: a 7-seater configuration that is based on the Alphard Executive Lounge variant, and a 4-seater configuration named the "Emperor Suite", based on the Alphard Royal Lounge variant.

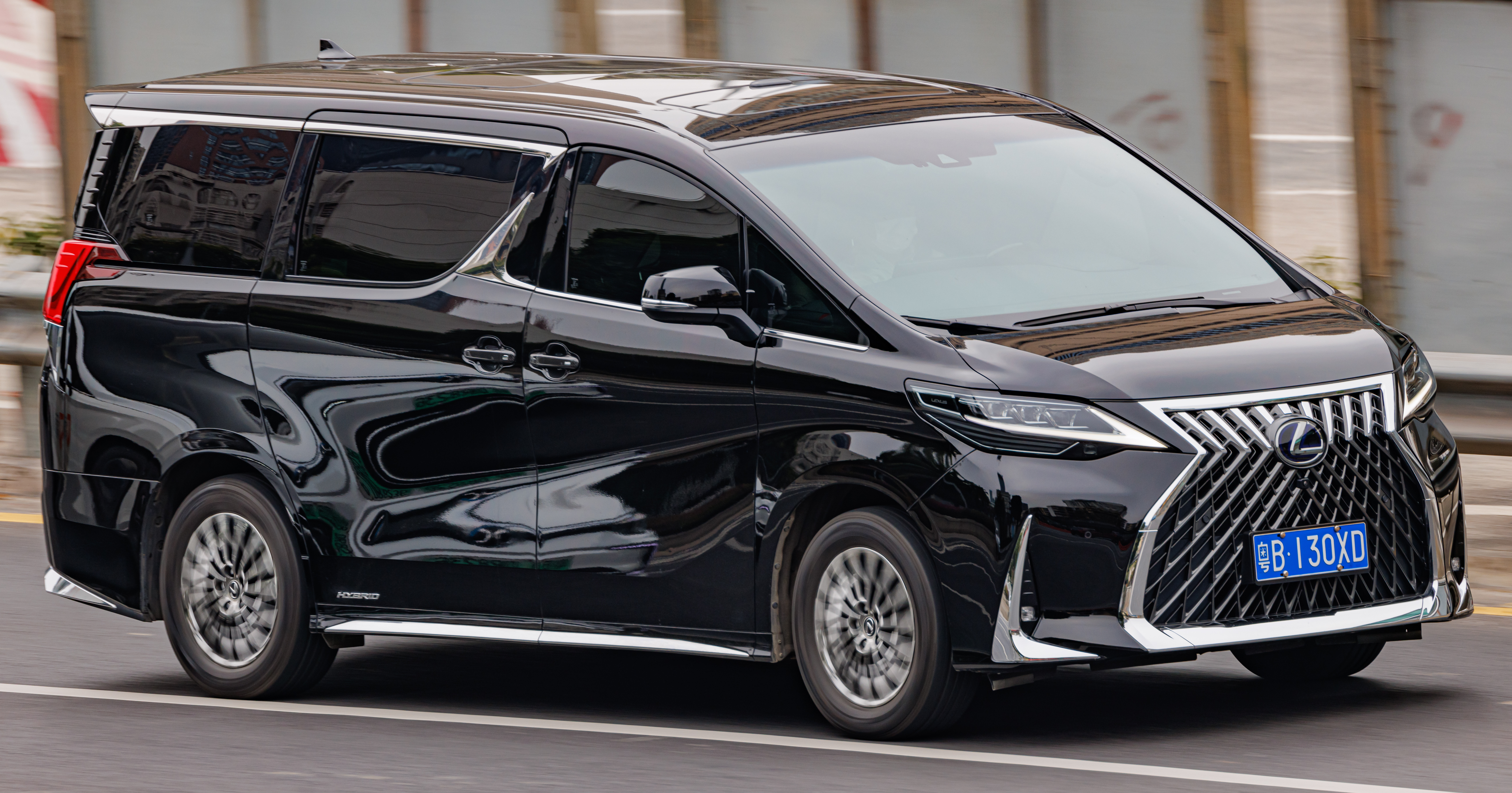
Lexus LM 300h front

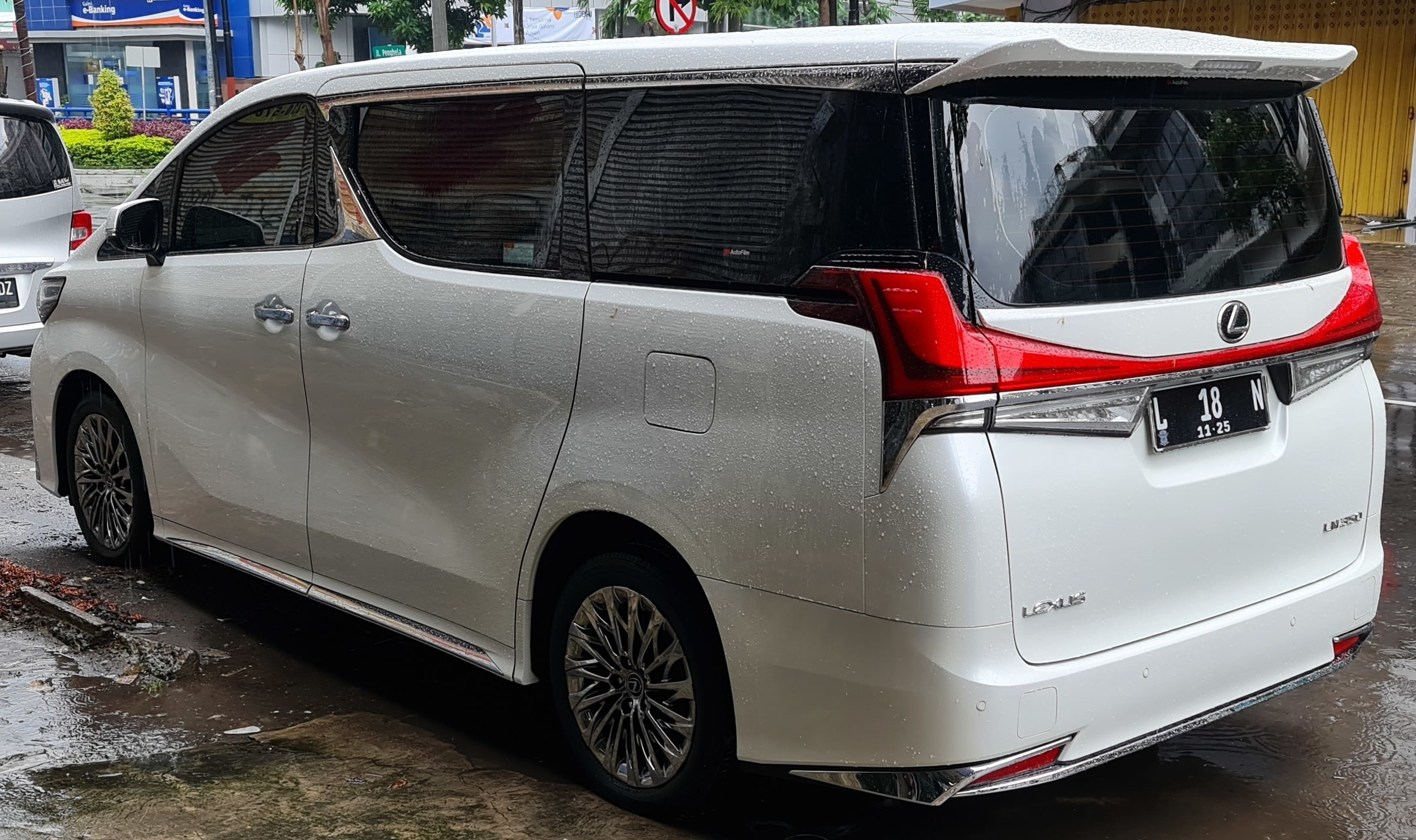
Lexus LM 350 rear

== Fourth generation (AH40; 2023) ==
Fourth generation
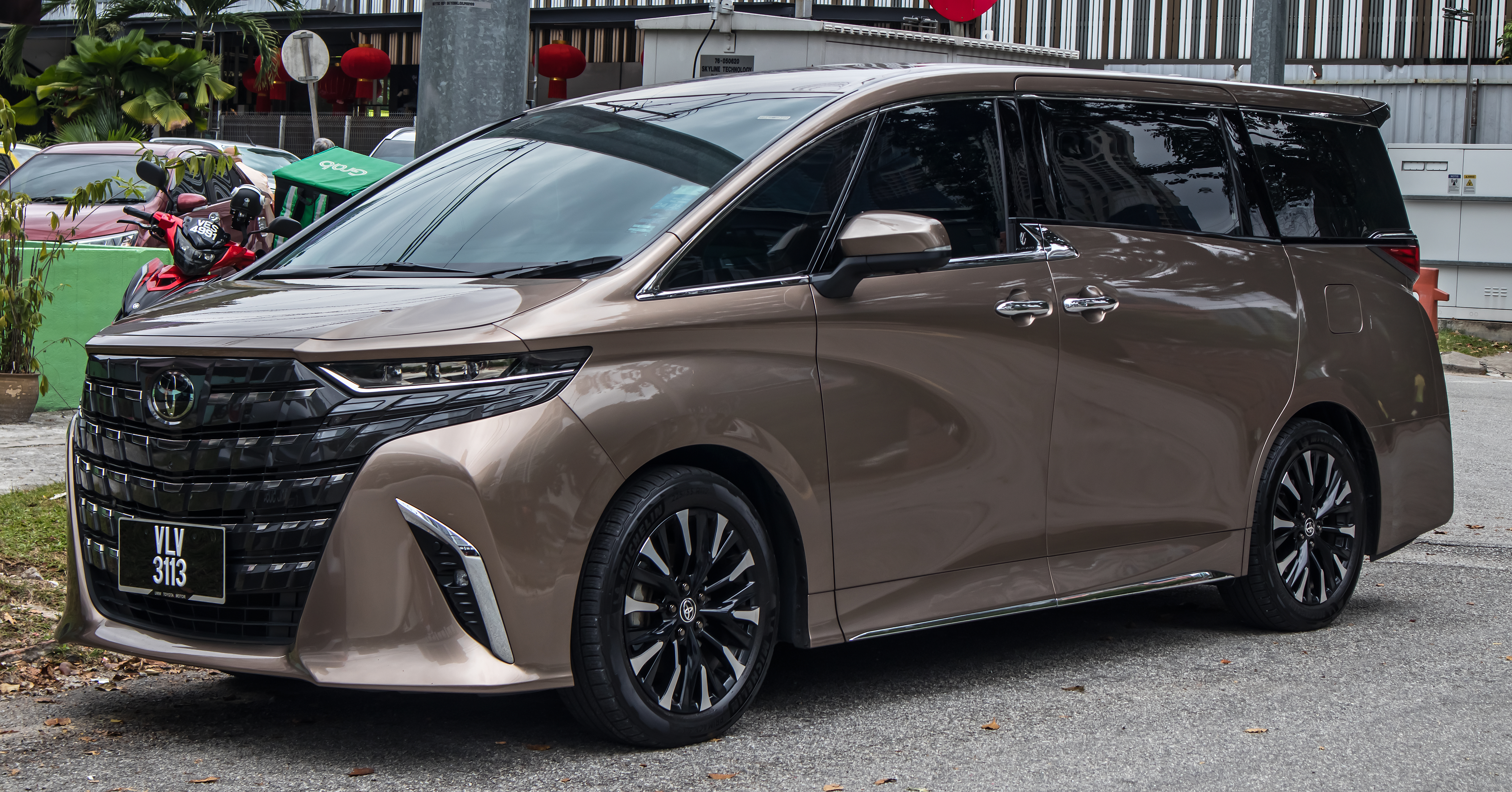
- Toyota Alphard Executive Lounge (Malaysia)

Overview
- Model code: AH40
- Also called: Toyota Vellfire; Toyota Crown Vellfire (China)
- Production: June 2023 – present
- Designer: Makoto Esuga

Body and chassis
- Platform: TNGA: GA-K
- Related: Lexus LM (AW10); Toyota Sienna/Granvia (XL40)

Powertrain
- Engine: Petrol: 2.4 L T24A-FTS turbo I4; 2.5 L 2AR-FE I4; Petrol hybrid: 2.5 L A25A-FXS I4; 2.5 L A25B-FXS I4 (China); Petrol plug-in hybrid: 2.5 L A25A-FXS I4
- Electric motor: AC synchronous; 5NM front + 4NM rear (hybrid)
- Transmission: 8-speed "Direct Shift" automatic; Super CVT-i automatic; e-CVT
- Hybrid drivetrain: Power-split (hybrid); PHEV (plug-in hybrid)
- Battery: 5-Ah nickel-metal hydride (hybrid); 18.1 kWh lithium-ion (plug-in hybrid)
- Plug-in charging: V2L: 1.5 kW (plug-in hybrid)

Dimensions
- Wheelbase: 3,000 mm (118.1 in)
- Length: 4,995–5,005 mm (196.7–197.0 in)
- Width: 1,850 mm (72.8 in)
- Height: 1,945 mm (76.6 in)
- Curb weight: 2,060 kg (4,542 lb); 2,130–2,230 kg (4,696–4,916 lb) (hybrid); 2,470 kg (5,445 lb) (plug-in hybrid)

The fourth-generation Alphard and the third-generation Vellfire were released on 21 June 2023. It is based on the TNGA-K platform along with the more luxurious Lexus LM. The exterior dimensions are kept within 5 m (16 ft) in length and 1.85 m (6.1 ft) in width, to ensure the vehicle conform with the size constraints of standard vertical automated parking systems in Japan.

The vehicle is equipped with straight rockers and a V-shaped brace in the rear-lower part of the vehicle for a 50% improvement in rigidity compared to the previous generation. Toyota also optimised the use of structural adhesives to limit deformation of the body. It uses MacPherson struts at the front and an updated double wishbone rear suspension. With the other measures like the use of rubber bushings in the attachment portions of the cushion frames and memory foam in the seats, the MPV received a 30% reduction in vibrations.

A notable change in the fourth generation Alphard is that its insignia has been moved from the front end to the front door window frames. The front of the Alphard now features Toyota's corporate emblem. For the first time, the Vellfire has its own unique insignia in the form of a stylized 'V', which is located on the window frames of the front doors.

According to Toyota's Chief Branding Officer Simon Humphries, who also oversees design work, the company wanted to end the Vellfire nameplate in light of its decreasing sales in Japan. However, the decision was reversed during development due to the pushbacks from dealers.

Alphard

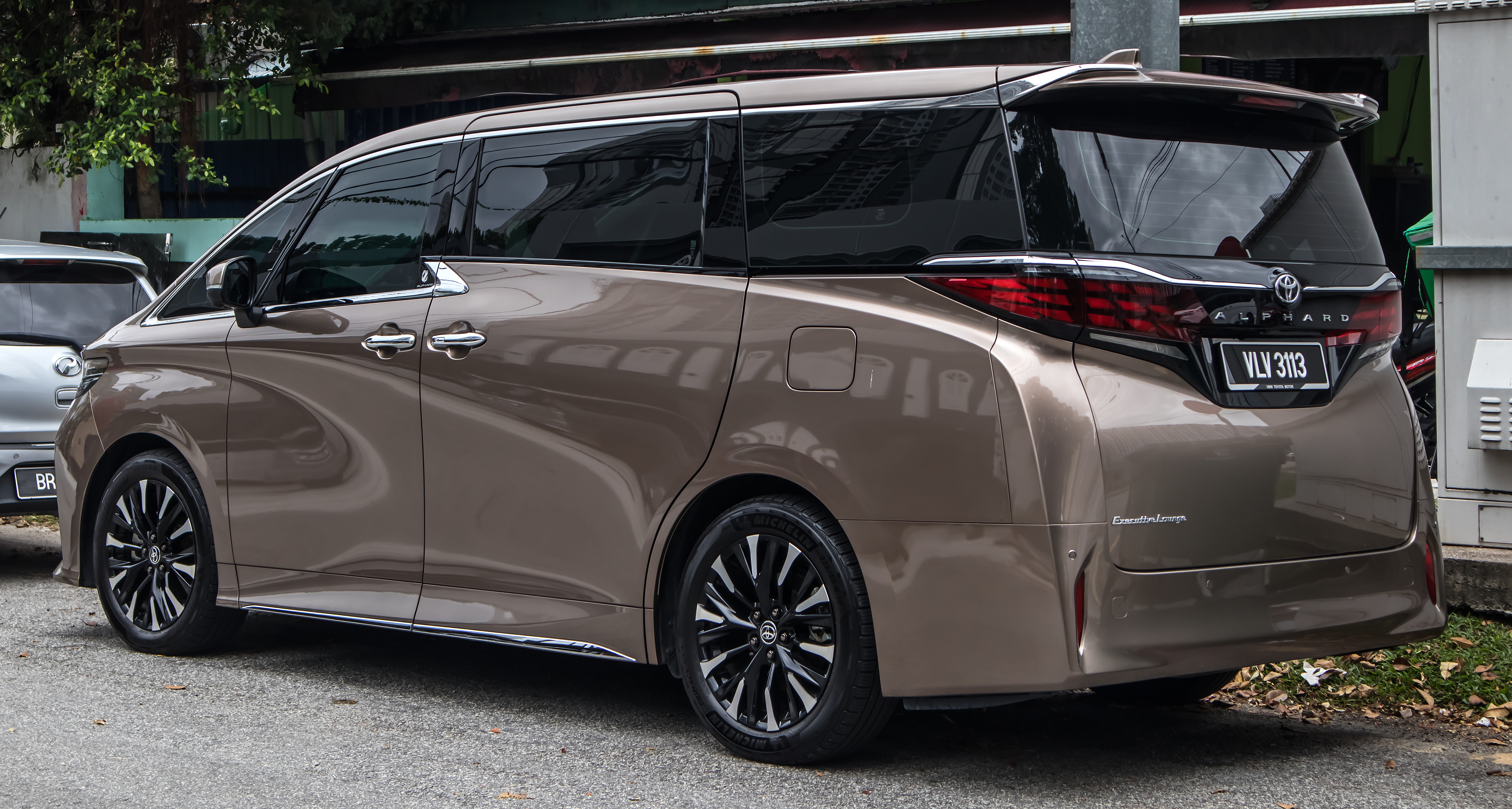
Rear view

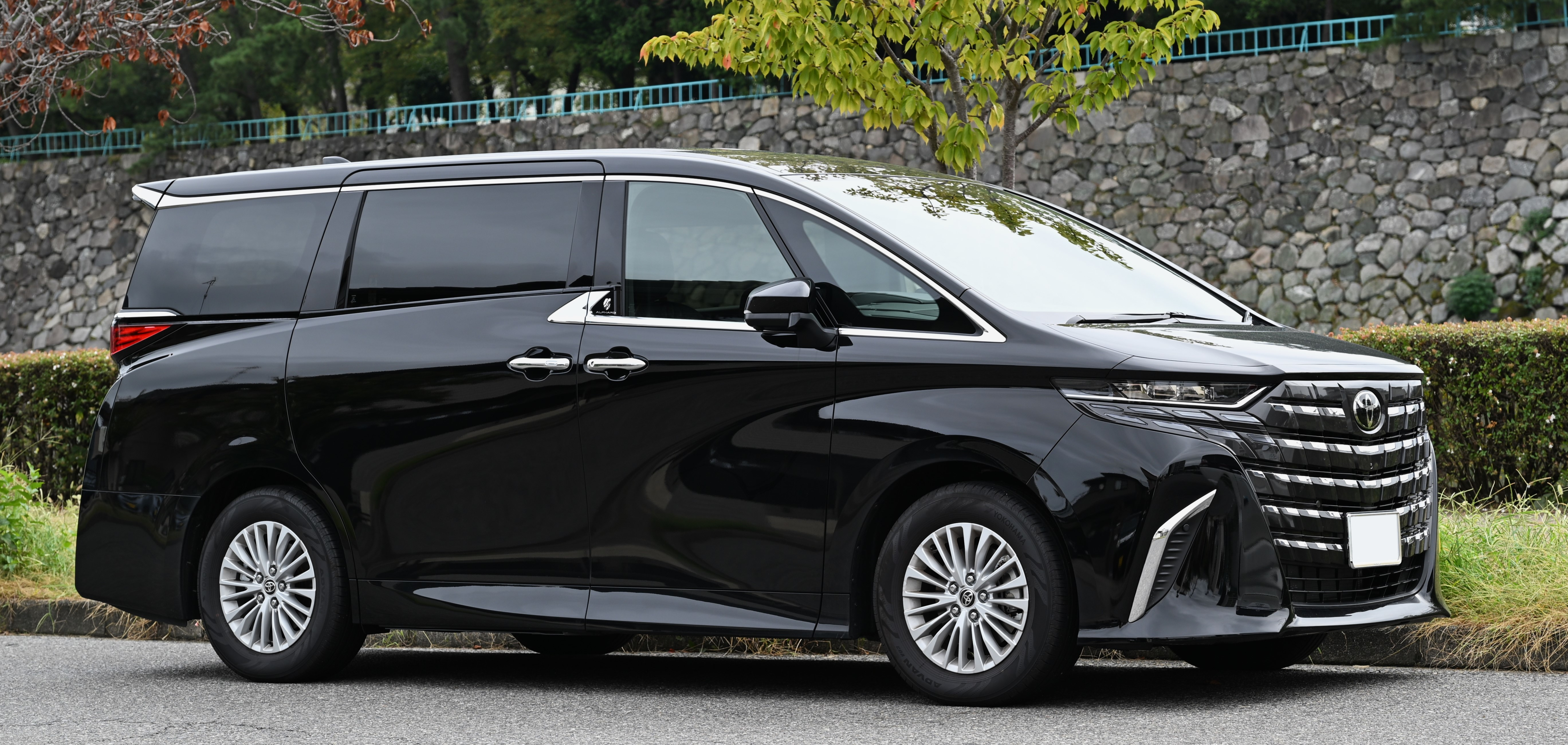
Toyota Alphard Hybrid X

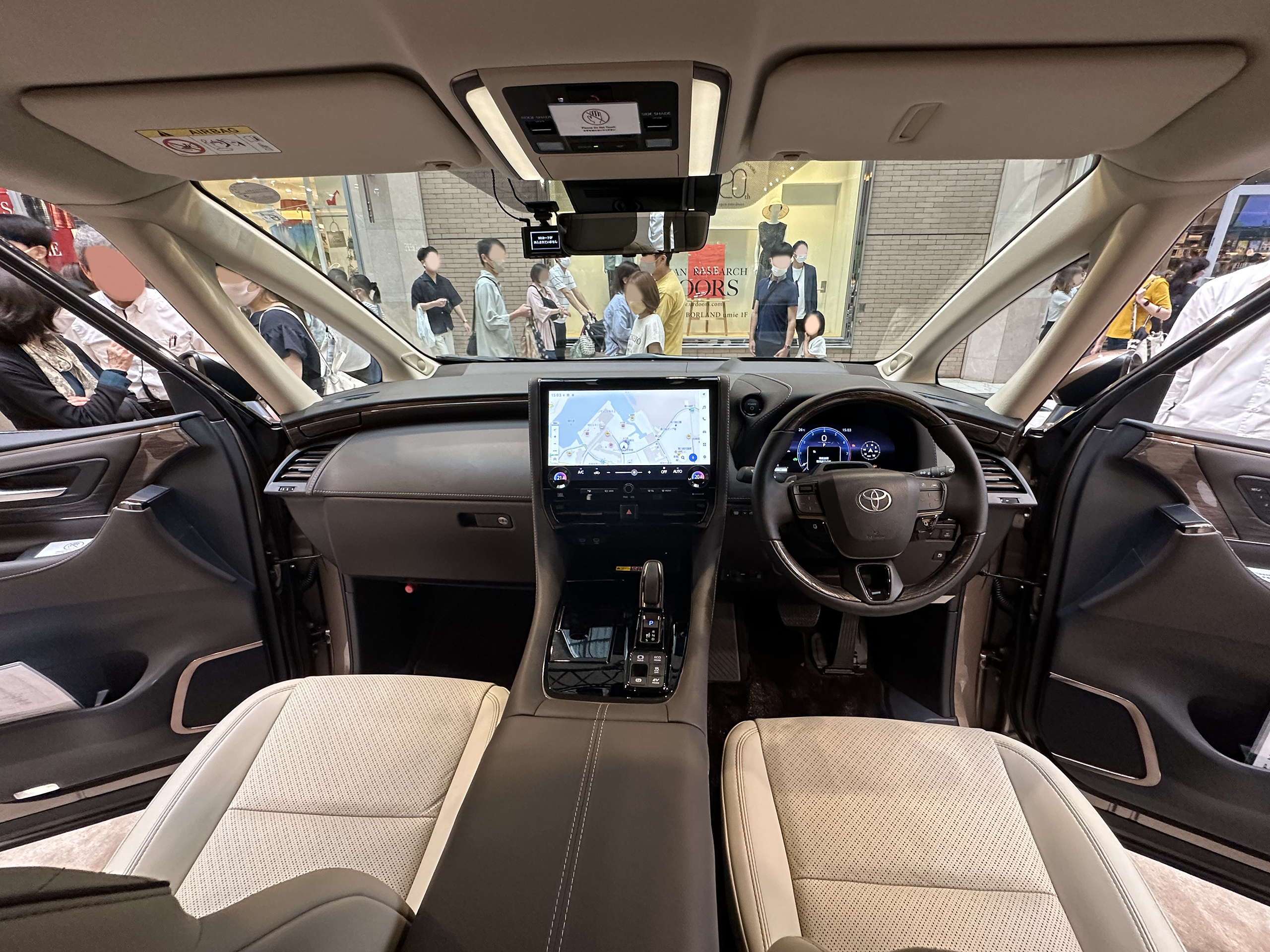
Interior

Vellfire

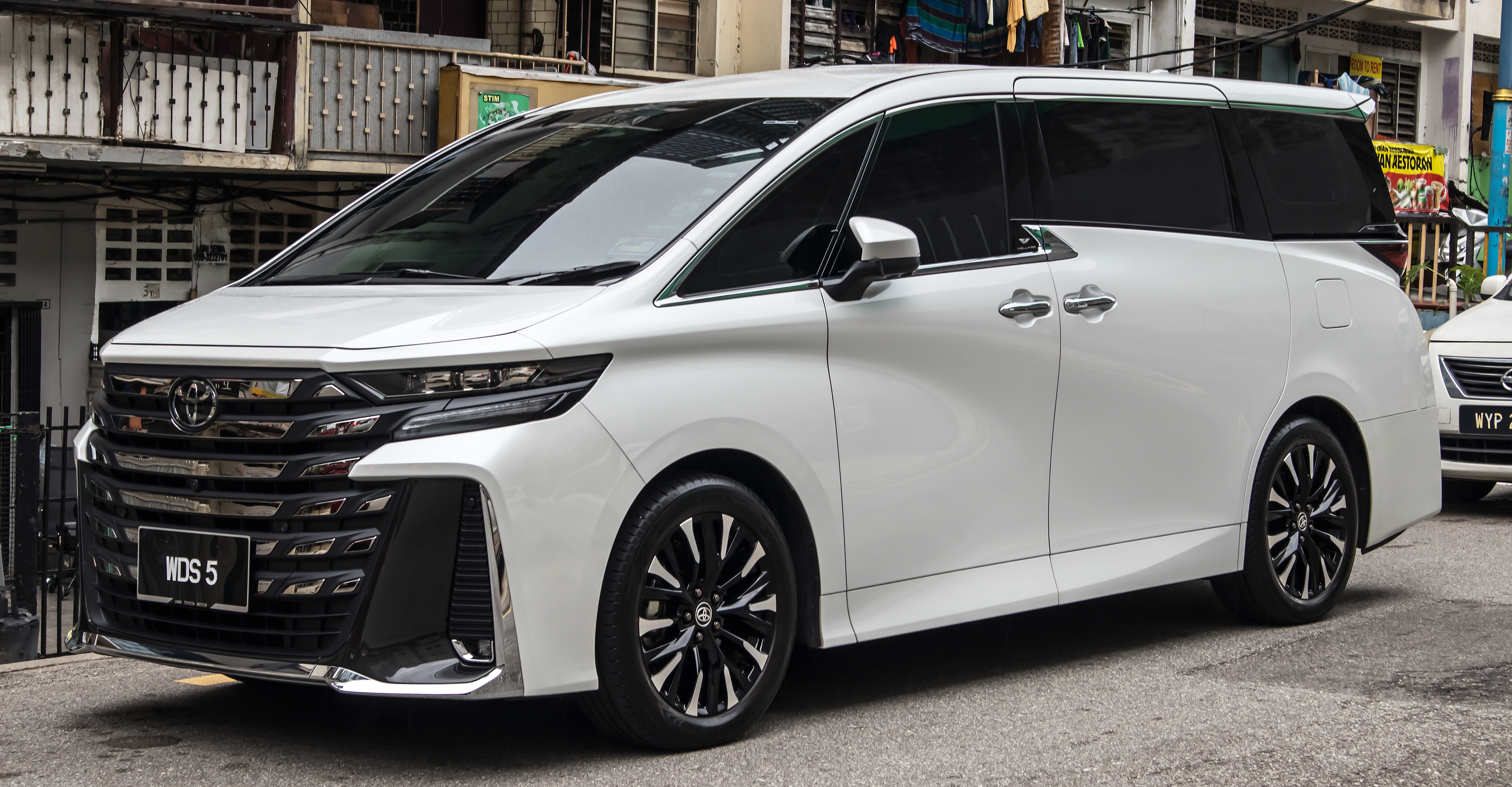
Toyota Vellfire (Malaysia)

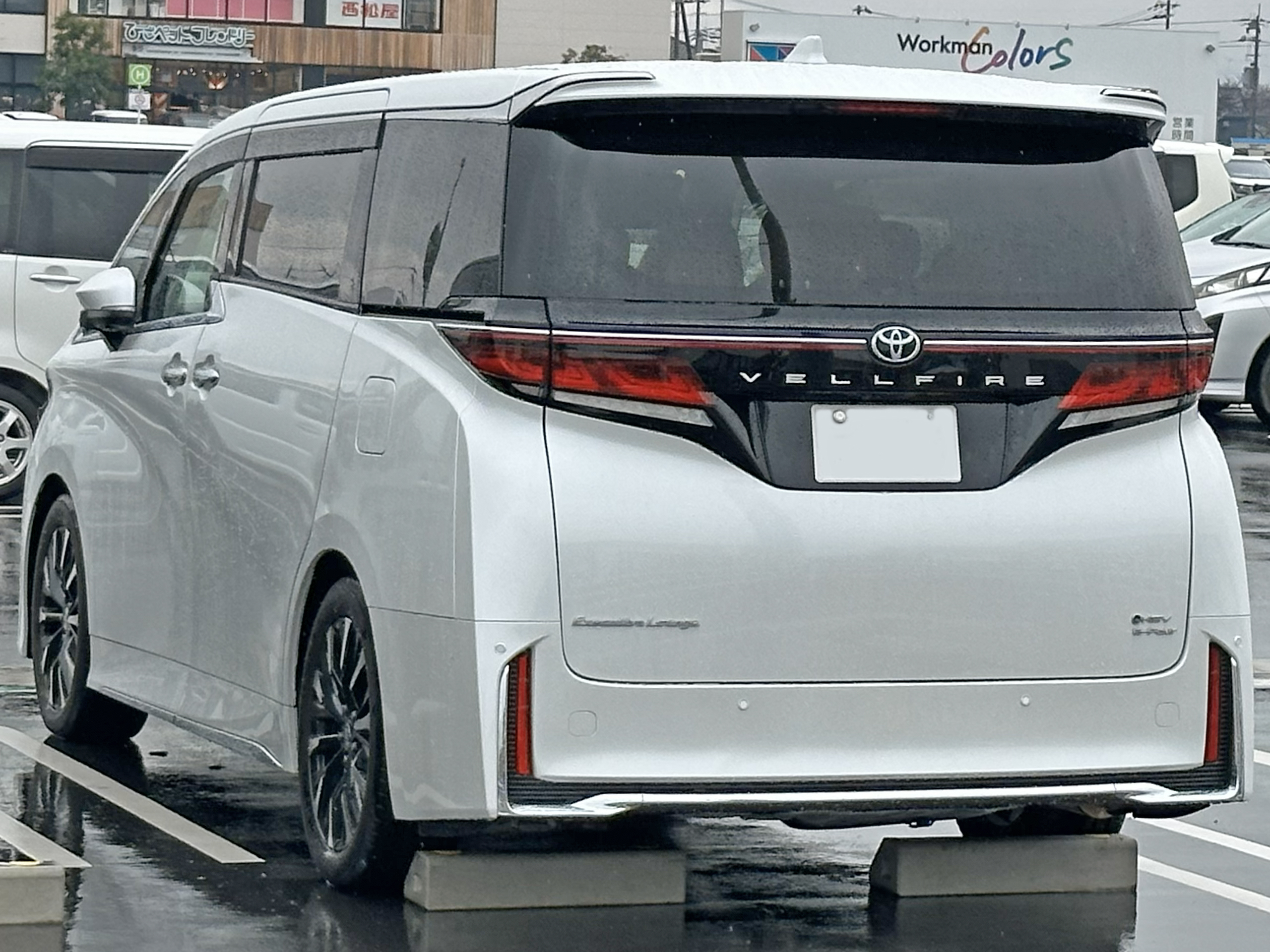
Rear view (Vellfire)

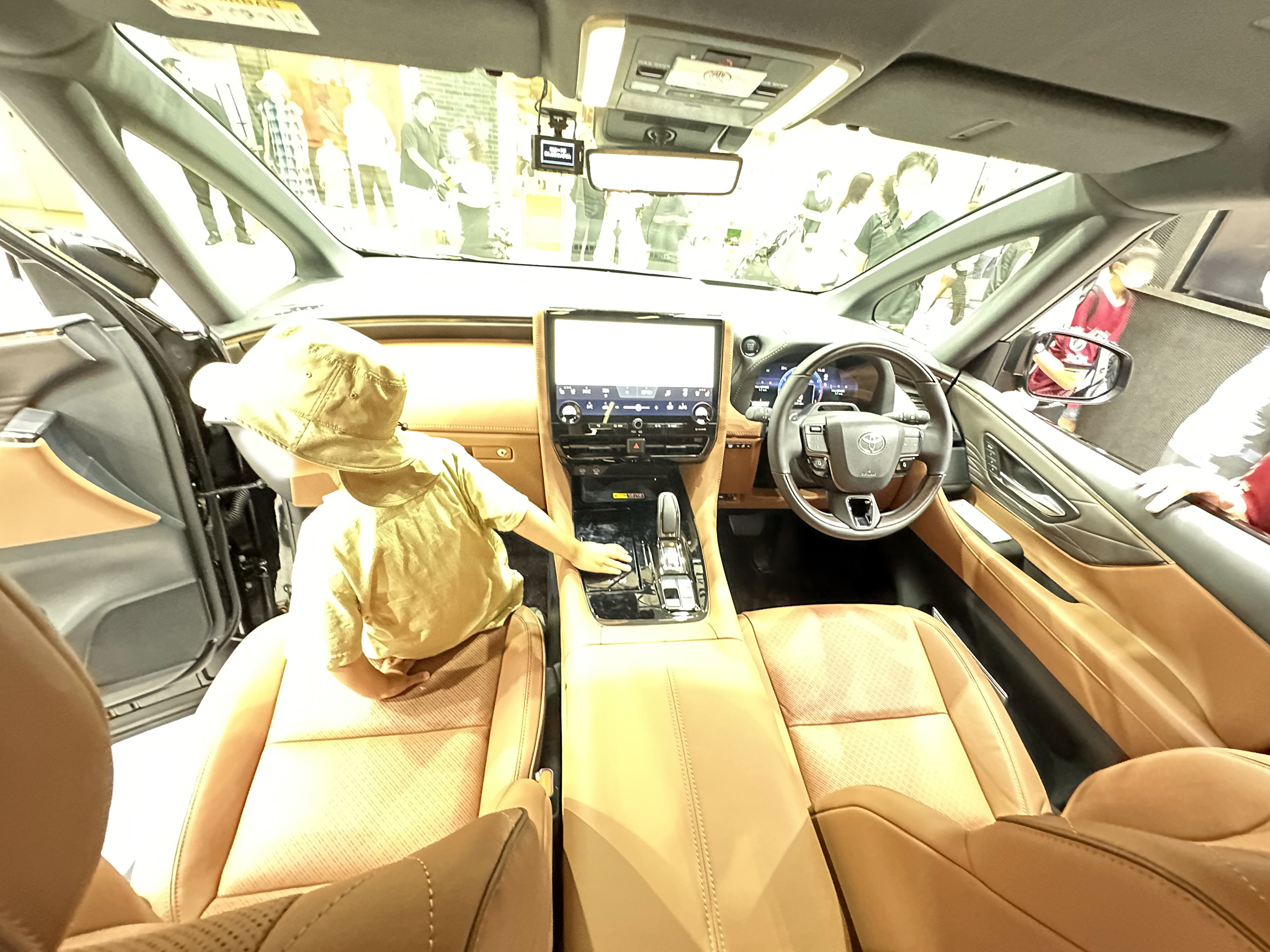
Interior (Vellfire)

Crown Vellfire

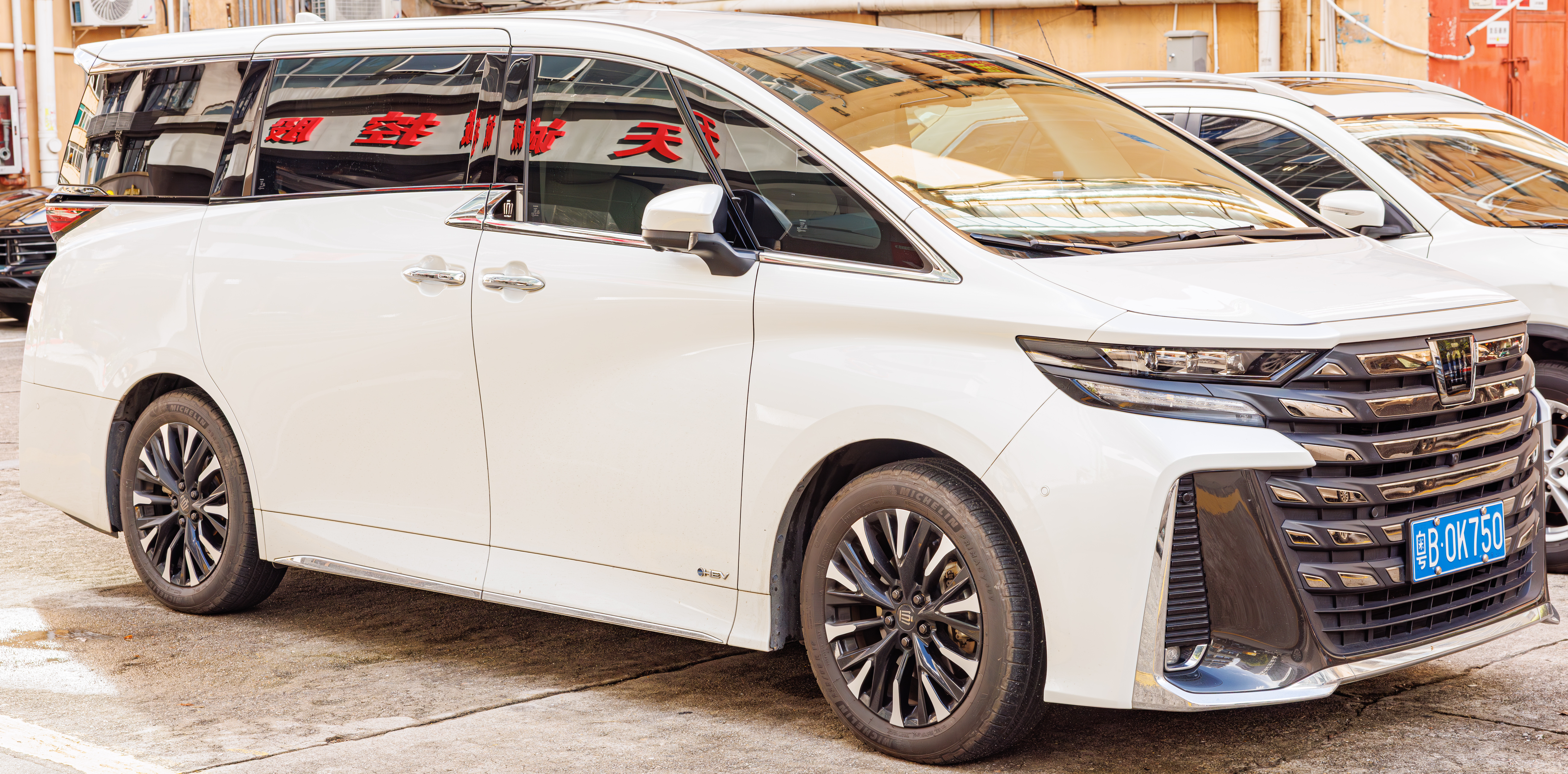
Toyota Crown Vellfire (China)

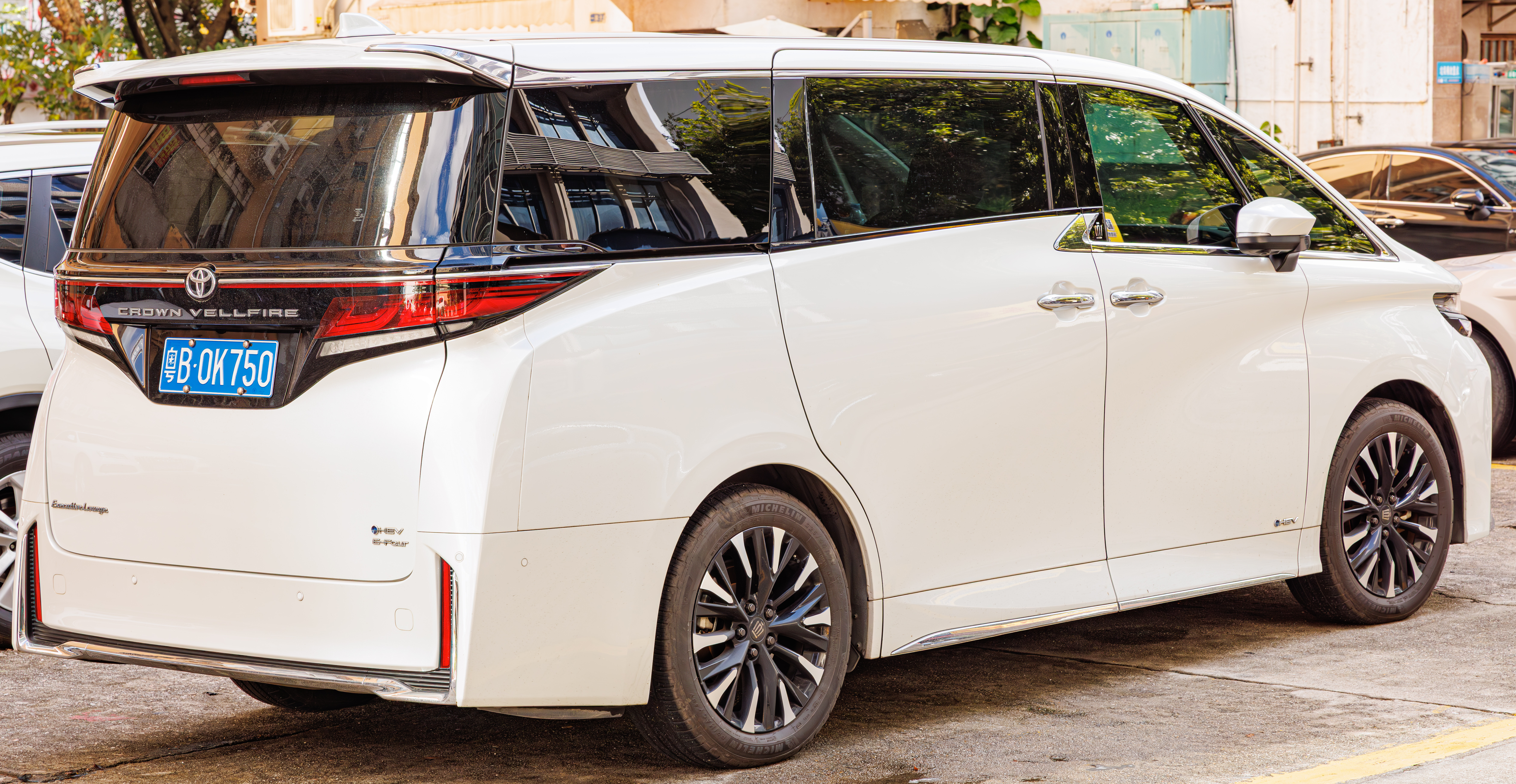
Rear view

=== Markets ===
==== Japan ====
The fourth-generation Alphard is offered in X, G, Z and Executive Lounge trims, while the third-generation Vellfire is offered in Z Premier and Executive Lounge Premier trims. In Japan, Toyota targeted the sales of the Alphard and Vellfire to number 8,500 units per month, of which the Alphard accounts for 70 per cent and the Vellfire for 30 per cent.

In November 2023, orders for the Alphard and Vellfire in Japan were suspended due to overwhelming demand after orders of the previous generation were suspended in June 2022. When the wait time for delivery of the models extended to August 2024, the decision was made to suspend orders until the backlog can be cleared.

The plug-in hybrid variant of the Alphard and Vellfire were announced in Japan on 20 December 2024, and sales commenced on 31 January 2025.

On 3 June 2026, the Alphard and Vellfire got a minor update. New variants were released for the Alphard: an entry-level G Hybrid, and Z Plug-in Hybrid.

==== Indonesia ====
The Indonesian market Alphard was launched at the 30th Gaikindo Indonesia International Auto Show on 10 August 2023. It is available in 2.5 X, 2.5 G and 2.5 HEV grade levels, comparable to the G, X, Z, and Executive Lounge grades in the Japanese market, respectively. The Vellfire followed later at the 31st Indonesia International Motor Show on 15 February 2024, available solely in 2.5 Executive Lounge HEV grade.

The entry-level variant, XE, was added at the 33rd Indonesia International Motor Show on 5 February 2026. Some features were cut including the head-up display and rear-seat entertainment screens. Furthermore, the wheel size is smaller than other Alphard models.

==== Taiwan ====
The Taiwanese market Alphard was launched in the same day as Japan launched the vehicle on 21 June 2023. It is only available in one grade and it is paired with 2.5-litre A25A-FXS petrol hybrid engine.

The plug-in hybrid variant of the Alphard was announced in Taiwan on 6 February 2025.

==== China ====
The Chinese market Crown Vellfire was introduced on 22 June 2023 with the 2.5-litre A25B-FXS petrol hybrid engine.

==== Malaysia ====
The Malaysian market Alphard and Vellfire were revealed on 6 July 2023 and officially launched on 23 October 2023. The Malaysian-spec Vellfire is powered by the 2.5-litre 2AR-FE petrol engine, serving it as an entry-level grade. While the Alphard is only available in Executive Lounge grade and it is powered with the 2.4-litre T24A-FTS turbocharged petrol engine. In January 2026, the Vellfire became available with the 2.5-litre A25A-FXS petrol hybrid engine in the Executive Lounge grade.

==== Hong Kong ====
The Hong Kong market Alphard and Vellfire were revealed on 8 July 2023.

==== India ====
The Indian market Vellfire hybrid was launched on 3 August 2023.

==== Philippines ====
The Philippine market Alphard became available on 11 August 2023. It is only offered in a single grade level (2.5 HEV CVT).

==== Thailand ====
The Thai market Alphard and Vellfire were revealed on 16 August 2023. They were offered in 2.5 HEV E-Four and 2.5 HEV Luxury E-Four trims. On 3 August 2026, the Thai market Alphard and Vellfire were upgraded with three trims available: 2.5 HEV Smart E-Four, 2.5 HEV Premium E-Four and 2.5 HEV Premium Luxury E-Four.

==== Brunei ====
The Bruneian market Alphard was launched on 18 August 2023. It was available in two variants, Standard with the 2.5-litre 2AR-FE petrol engine and Executive Lounge with the 2.4-litre T24A-FTS turbocharged petrol engine.

==== Vietnam ====
The Vietnamese market Alphard was launched on 22 November 2023, it was available in two variants, powered by either a 2.4-litre T24A-FTS turbocharged petrol engine or a 2.5-litre A25A-FXS petrol hybrid engine.

==== South Korea ====
The South Korean market Alphard was launched in September 2023. It is positioned above the Sienna in Toyota's Korean lineup and is available in a single hybrid top trim level (2.5 HEV Executive Lounge E-Four).

=== Powertrain ===
For the Japanese market, the Alphard is powered by a 2.5-litre 2AR-FE petrol engine paired to a Super CVT-i automatic that is carried over from the previous generation, and a brand new 2.5-litre A25A-FXS petrol-hybrid engine. The Vellfire has a 2.4-litre T24A-FTS turbo petrol engine alongside the 2.5-litre petrol hybrid engine. The 3.5-litre 2GR-FKS V6 engine option was discontinued from the lineup.

Type	Engine code	Displacement	Power	Torque	Combined system output	Electric motor	Battery	Transmission	Model code	Layout	Cal. years
Petrol	2AR-FE	2,493 cc (2.5 L) I4	134 kW (182 PS; 180 hp) @ 6,000 rpm	235 N⋅m (24.0 kg⋅m; 173 lb⋅ft) @ 4,100 rpm	-	-	-	Super CVT-i	AGH40	FWD	2023–present
Petrol	2AR-FE	2,493 cc (2.5 L) I4	134 kW (182 PS; 180 hp) @ 6,000 rpm	235 N⋅m (24.0 kg⋅m; 173 lb⋅ft) @ 4,100 rpm	-	-	-	Super CVT-i	AGH45	AWD	2023–present
Petrol	T24A-FTS	2,393 cc (2.4 L) I4 turbocharged	205 kW (279 PS; 275 hp) @ 6,000 rpm	430 N⋅m (43.8 kg⋅m; 317 lb⋅ft) @ 1,700–3,600 rpm	-	-	-	8-speed "Direct Shift" automatic	TAHA40	FWD	2023–present
Petrol	T24A-FTS	2,393 cc (2.4 L) I4 turbocharged	205 kW (279 PS; 275 hp) @ 6,000 rpm	430 N⋅m (43.8 kg⋅m; 317 lb⋅ft) @ 1,700–3,600 rpm	-	-	-	8-speed "Direct Shift" automatic	TAHA45	AWD	2023–present
Petrol hybrid	A25A-FXS	2,487 cc (2.5 L) I4	Engine: 140 kW (190 PS; 188 hp) @ 6,000 rpm Front motor: 134 kW (182 PS; 180 hp)	Engine: 236 N⋅m (24.1 kg⋅m; 174 lb⋅ft) @ 4,300–4,500 rpm Front motor: 270 N⋅m (27.5 kg⋅m; 199 lb⋅ft)	184 kW (250 PS; 247 hp)	5NM AC synchronous (front)	5 Ah NiMH	eCVT	AAHH40	FWD	2023–present
Petrol hybrid	A25A-FXS	2,487 cc (2.5 L) I4	+ Rear motor: 40 kW (54 PS; 54 hp)	+ Rear motor: 121 N⋅m (12.3 kg⋅m; 89.2 lb⋅ft)	184 kW (250 PS; 247 hp)	+ 4NM AC synchronous (rear)	5 Ah NiMH	eCVT	AAHH45	AWD	2023–present

=== Vellfire Spacious Lounge Concept ===
In late October 2023, Toyota showcased a modified version of the AH40 Vellfire, called the Vellfire Spacious Lounge Concept, at the 2023 Japan Mobility Show. It is a 4-seater version of the production Vellfire, with a privacy curtain separating the driver and front passenger from the rear, a mini-fridge, floor trays, new carpeting, folding tables, power outlets and speakers integrated into the seats and headrests respectively, and a coat rack in the trunk. It is painted in a dark grey colour. The Vellfire Spacious Lounge Concept was built by Toyota Auto Body.

The Spacious Lounge Concept entered production virtually unchanged for 2025, with sales to commence January 31, where it is exclusive to the new Alphard PHEV. It is based on the Executive Lounge and is geared towards chauffeur use.

== Sales ==
Year	Japan		China		Indonesia			Malaysia (Note: Figures based on registration (Malaysia))		
Year	Alphard	Vellfire	Alphard	LM	Alphard	Vellfire	LM	Alphard	Vellfire	LM
2002	53,428				—	—	—	3		
2003	83,529				—	—	—	120		
2004	85,953				—	—	—	205		
2005	81,647				—	—	—	489		
2006	66,199				—	—	—	892		
2007	52,236				—	—	—	2,589		
2008	45,119	38,969			54	—	—	3,367	7	
2009	29,602	49,636			182	—	—	3,472	272	
2010	35,754	61,015			198	—	—	3,339	1,532	
2011	17,783	27,206			319	—	—	2,240	2,758	
2012	41,471	58,513			2,833	—	—	1,681	3,642	
2013	33,764	50,575			914	—	—	1,463	6,064	
2014	25,863	36,734			1,146	—	—	1,500	7,545	
2015	44,366	54,180			2,349	751	—	1,602	8,597	
2016	37,069	48,982			2,202	716	—	1,874	7,767	
2017	41,923	46,757	8,177		3,208	918	—	2,268	7,484	
2018	58,806	43,130	12,814		4,118	870	—	4,312	9,554	
2019	68,705	41,429	16,181		4,151	486	—	4,490	6,963	
2020	90,748	18,004	24,031	3,268	2,490	223	221	5,274	6,203	
2021	95,049	6,509	23,952		3,327	312	162	6,290	7,031	24
2022	60,225	2,984	21,032	3,609	4,928	322	315	13,308	7,115	4
2023	53,086	13,218	19,902	2,638	3,601	244	537	14,322	4,897	4
2024	79,374	33,105	16,507	3,783	5,518	510	1,452	15,395	3,503	13
2025			12,246		2,397	384	1,006	17,601	3,551	87

== See also ==
- List of Toyota vehicles
