= Toyota Harrier =

Crossover SUV produced by Toyota

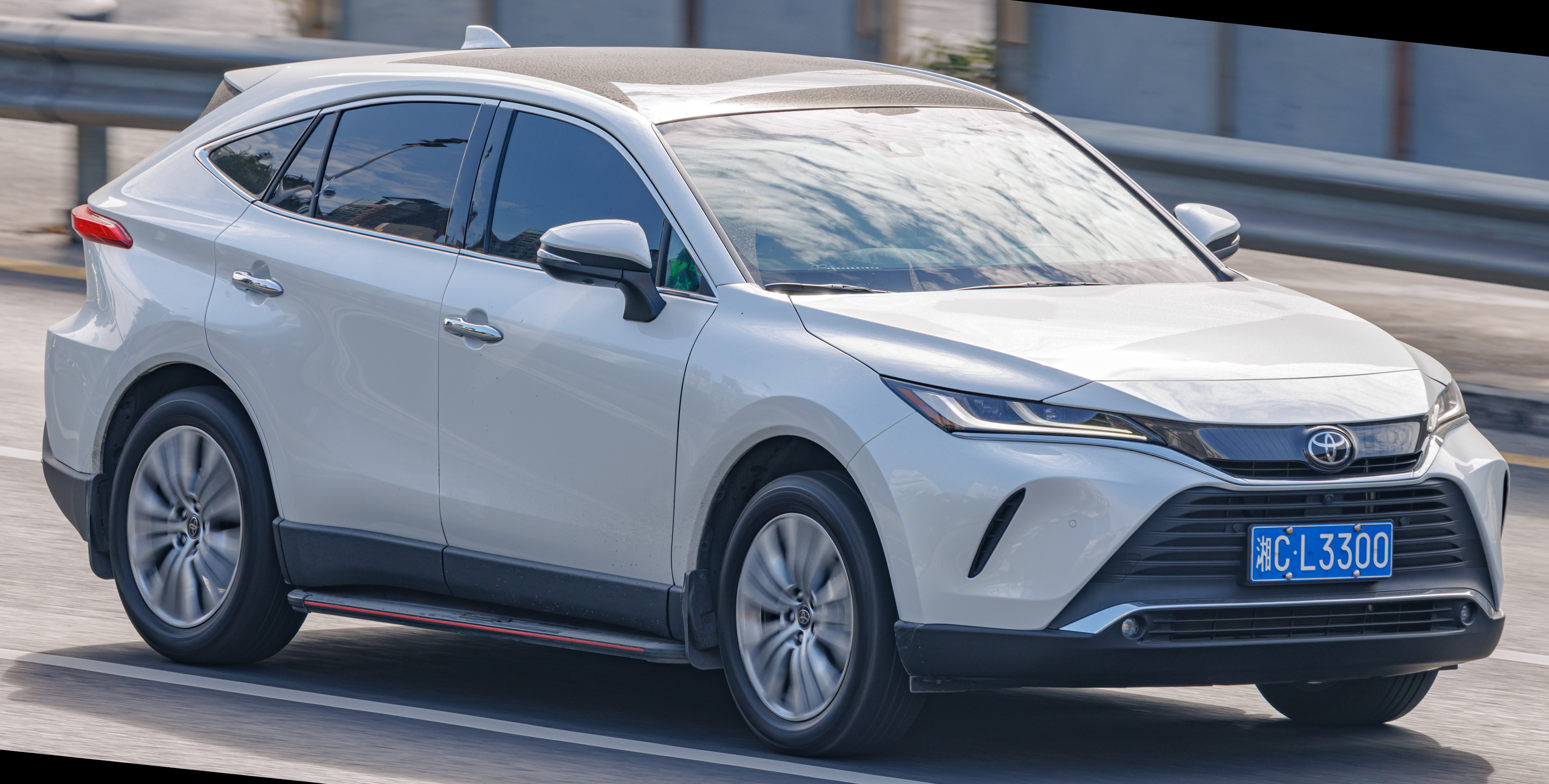
- FAW Toyota Harrier (XU80, China)

Overview
- Manufacturer: Toyota
- Also called: Lexus RX (1998–2013); Toyota Venza (North America, 2020-2024; China, 2021–2026)
- Production: December 1997 – present

Body and chassis
- Class: Compact crossover SUV (1997–2003); Mid-size crossover SUV (2003–present)
- Body style: 5-door SUV
- Layout: Front-engine, front-wheel-drive; Front-engine, four-wheel-drive

The Toyota Harrier (Japanese: トヨタ・ハリアー, Hepburn: Toyota Hariā) is a five-passenger compact, later mid-size crossover SUV produced by Toyota since December 1997 in Japan, which was once exclusive to Toyopet Store Japanese dealerships. In export markets, the Harrier was rebadged as the Lexus RX from March 1998 to December 2008. At this stage, Toyota had yet to retail the Lexus brand to its Japanese customers.

The second generation (XU30) debuted in February 2003, along with the export Lexus version. The third-generation RX (separated from the Harrier) arrived in late 2008, while the Harrier continued on in second-generation form unchanged (although the second generation Harrier 350G, equivalent to second generation RX350, was discontinued after the release of third generation Lexus RX). Lexus had by now made its debut in Japan as an independent marque, thus the third-generation RX was sold in the domestic market in the same livery as its export counterpart.

The third generation (XU60) debuted in 2013, when it morphed into an independent model line constructed on a separate platform from the RX (the Harrier since then built on the same platform as the RAV4) but retaining a visual link with it. Starting at this point, it is considered as a more road-oriented and upmarket alternative to the RAV4, comparable to the luxury-class Lexus NX. From the fourth generation (XU80), it is also sold as the second-generation Venza in North America and China.

The Harrier is named for the eastern marsh harrier, a bird of prey common to Hokkaidō and northern Honshū called the chūhi in Japanese, and an emblem depicting the bird in stylized profile can be found on the grille until the XU60 model.

== Lexus RX-paralleled models ==
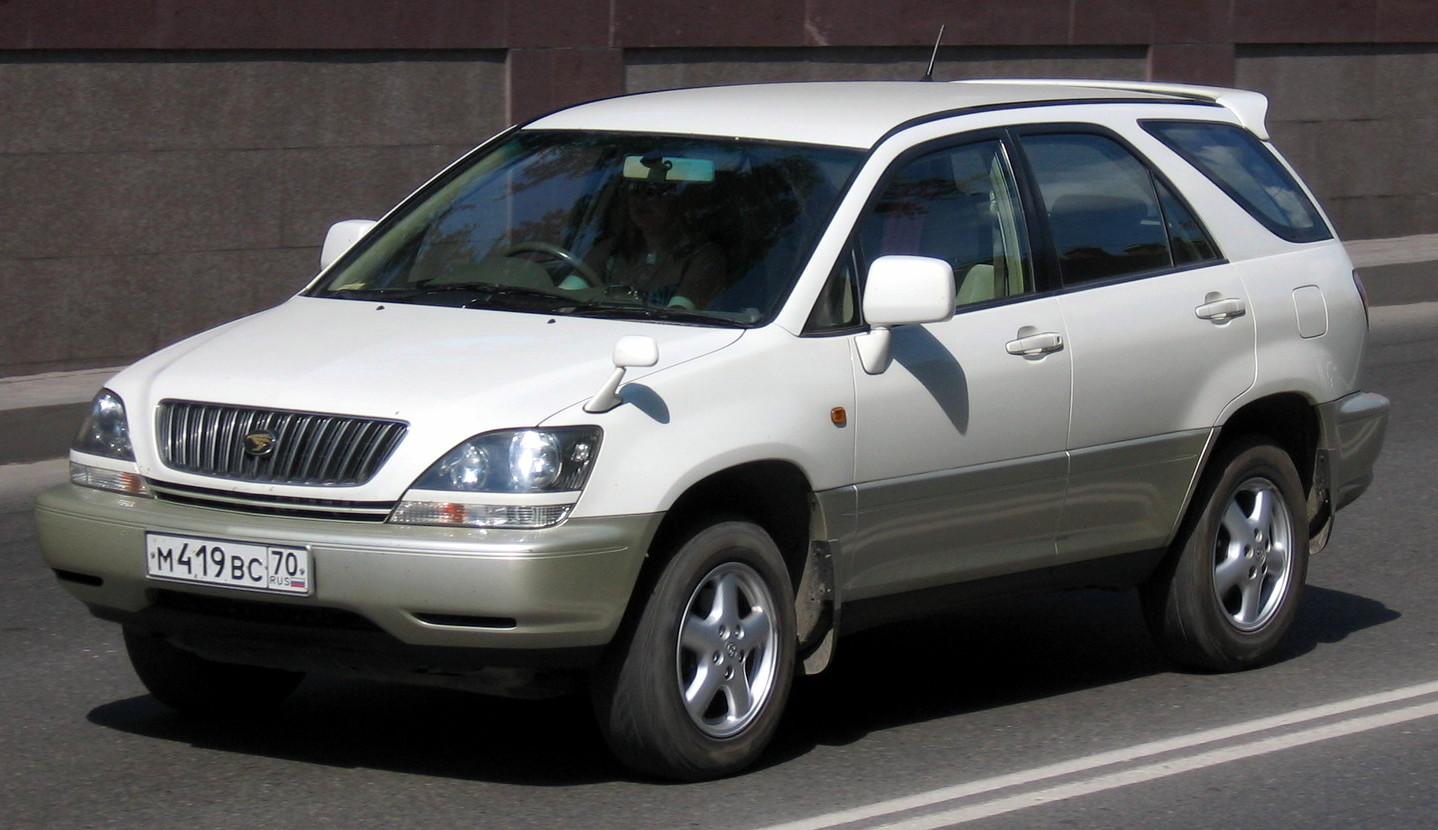
First generation (XU10; 1997)

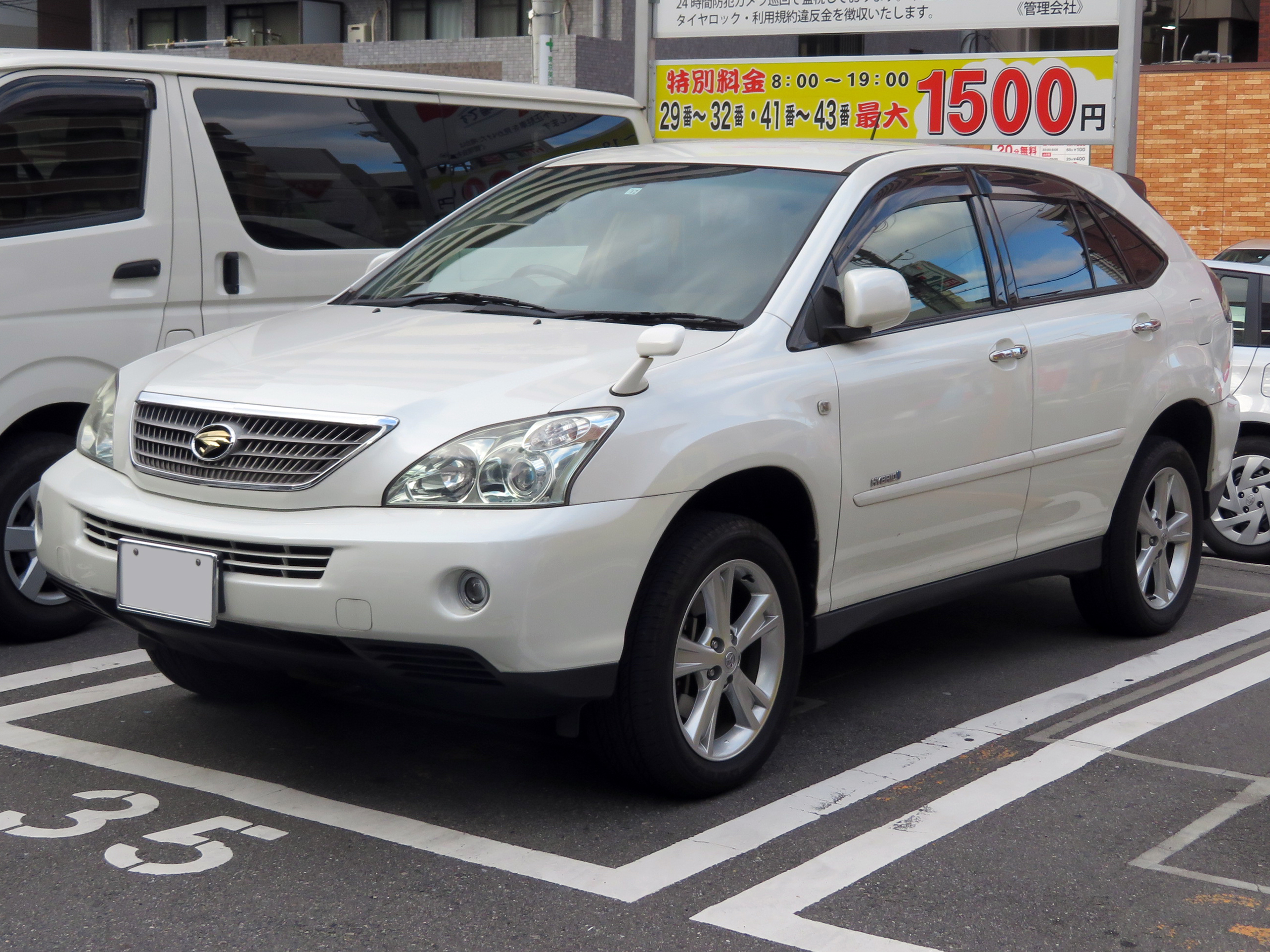
Second generation (XU30; 2003)

== Third generation (XU60; 2013) ==
Third generation
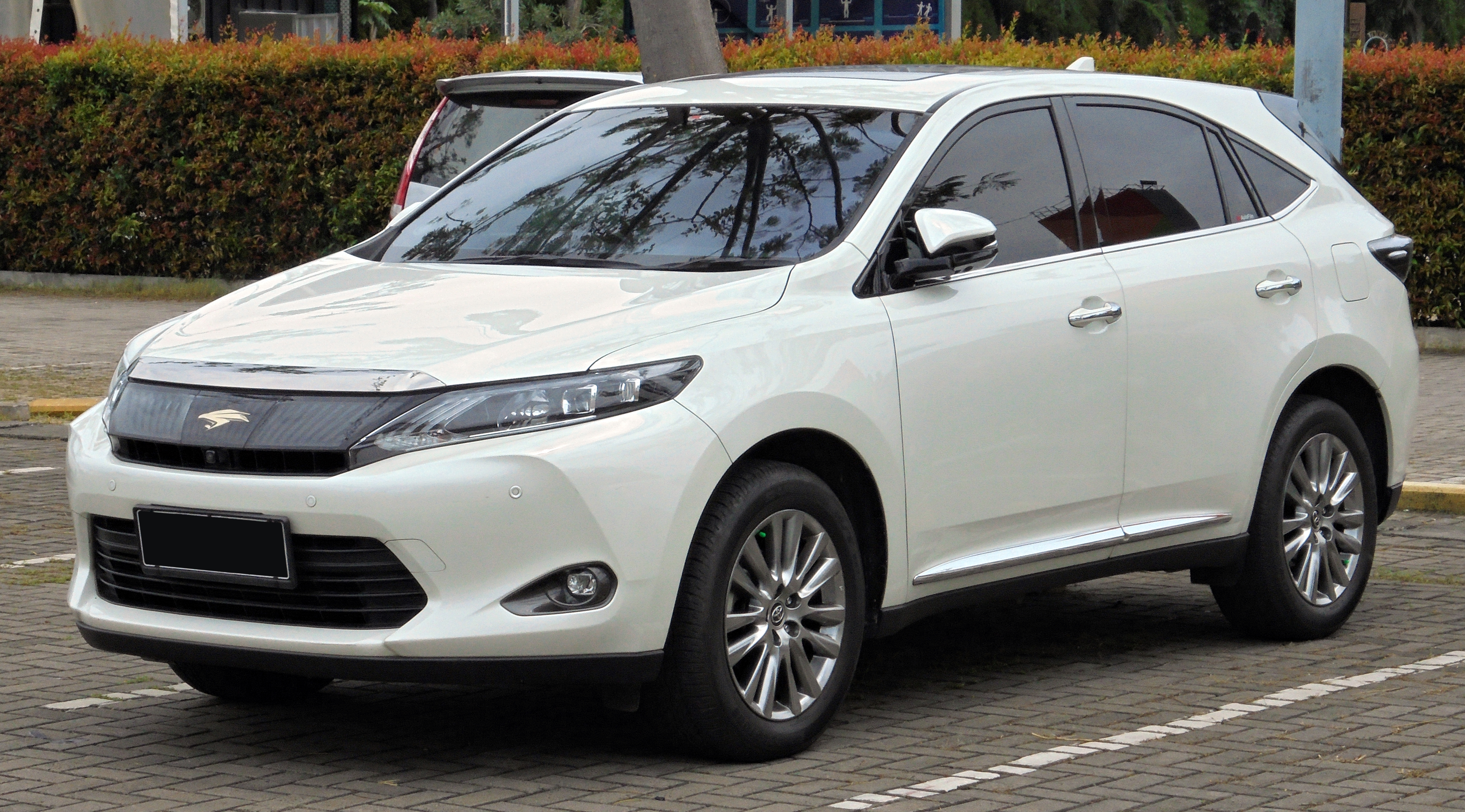
- 2015 Toyota Harrier Premium FWD (ZSU60)

Overview
- Model code: XU60
- Production: November 2013 – May 2020
- Assembly: Japan: Toyota City, Aichi (Takaoka plant)

Body and chassis
- Platform: Toyota New MC platform
- Related: Toyota RAV4 (XA40); Lexus NX (AZ10)

Powertrain
- Engine: Petrol: 1986 cc 3ZR-FAE I4 (ZSU60/65); 1998 cc 8AR-FTS turbo I4 (ASU60/65); Petrol hybrid: 2493 cc 2AR-FXE I4 (AVU65)
- Electric motor: 105 kW (141 hp; 143 PS) 2JM synchronous (front, hybrid); 50 kW (67 hp; 68 PS) 2FM synchronous (rear, hybrid)
- Power output: 111 kW (149 hp; 151 PS) (3ZR-FAE); 170 kW (228 hp; 231 PS) (8AR-FTS); 112 kW (150 hp; 152 PS) (2AR-FXE, petrol engine only); 145 kW (194 hp; 197 PS) (2AR-FXE, combined system output)
- Transmission: Super CVT-i with 7-speed simulation (petrol); 6-speed U661 automatic (turbo); eCVT (hybrid)
- Hybrid drivetrain: Power-split (hybrid)

Dimensions
- Wheelbase: 2,660 mm (104.7 in)
- Length: 4,720–4,770 mm (185.8–187.8 in)
- Width: 1,835 mm (72.2 in)
- Height: 1,690 mm (66.5 in)
- Kerb weight: 1,560–1,810 kg (3,439–3,990 lb)

Chronology
- Predecessor: Toyota Vanguard (XA30); Toyota Mark X ZiO

Released on 2 December 2013 in Japan for the petrol model and 15 January 2014 for the hybrid model, the XU60 series Harrier replaced not only its XU30 series namesake, but also the XA30 series Vanguard. Unlike the second and third-generation RX, which is built on the K platform, the XU60 series Harrier derived from the XA40 series RAV4's New MC underpinnings.

Trim levels available in Japan include Grand, Elegance, and Premium for both the petrol and hybrid models. The top-of-the-line Premium trim came with JBL GreenEdge audio with 8-inch T-Connect touchscreen entertainment system with navigation and sensing features. A "Style Mauve" special edition and subsequently the "Style Ash" special edition was released later.

The XU60 series Harrier received a facelift on 8 June 2017. For the facelift model, the Grand trim was removed and Elegance became the base trim. The Progress trim replaced Premium as the flagship trim, with the "Metal and Leather Package" added to both Premium and Progress trims. The "Style NOIR" special edition for naturally-aspirated Premium trim were also added later. A Turbo model was introduced with a 2.0-litre turbocharged 8AR-FTS engine mated to a 6-speed U661 automatic transmission, while the 2.0-litre naturally-aspirated 3ZR-FAE and 2.5-litre 2AR-FXE hybrid engines remained.

Toyota Safety Sense P safety system (adaptive cruise control, lane departure assist, pre-collision system and automatic high beam) were standard across the trim levels.

The XU60 series Harrier was the first Harrier to be officially sold outside of Japan. It was offered in Singapore and Malaysia. In Singapore, it was introduced on 20 July 2017, featuring a turbocharged 2.0 litre engine delivering 169 kW (227 hp), Toyota Safety Sense P, and a Sports mode with better acceleration. Three trim levels were offered: Elegance, Premium and Luxury. In Malaysia, it was introduced in November 2017 with two trim levels offered: Premium and Luxury. Both trim levels are powered by a 2.0-litre 8AR-FTS engine.

=== Engines ===
Chassis code	Engine	Transmission	Power	Torque	Year of availability
Petrol engines
ZSU60 (FWD); ZSU65 (4WD)	1,986 cc 3ZR-FAE DOHC 16-valve EFI straight-four with Dual VVT-i and Valvematic	Super CVT-i with 7-speed simulation	111 kW (149 hp; 151 PS) at 6,100 rpm	193 N⋅m (142 lb⋅ft) at 3,800 rpm	2013–2020
ASU60 (FWD); ASU65 (4WD)	1,998 cc 8AR-FTS DOHC 16-valve EFI turbocharged straight-four with VVT-iW and D-4ST	6-speed U661 automatic	170 kW (228 hp; 231 PS) at 5,200–5,600 rpm	350 N⋅m (260 lb⋅ft) at 1,650–4,000 rpm	2017–2020
Hybrid engines
AVU65 (4WD)	2,493 cc 2AR-FXE DOHC 16-valve EFI straight-four with VVT-iE	eCVT	112 kW (150 hp; 152 PS) at 5,700 rpm	206 N⋅m (152 lb⋅ft) at 4,400–4,800 rpm	2013–2020

=== Gallery ===
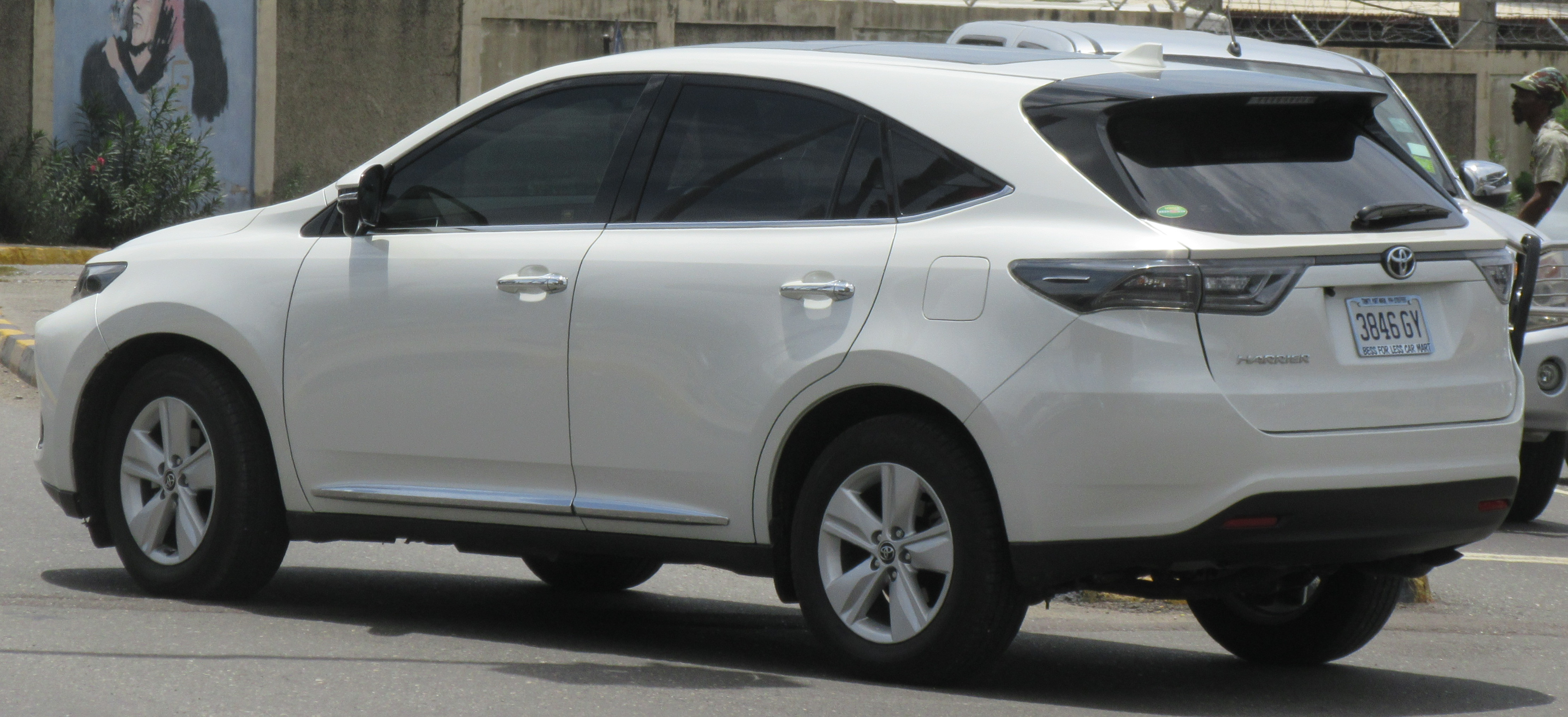
Harrier (pre-facelift)

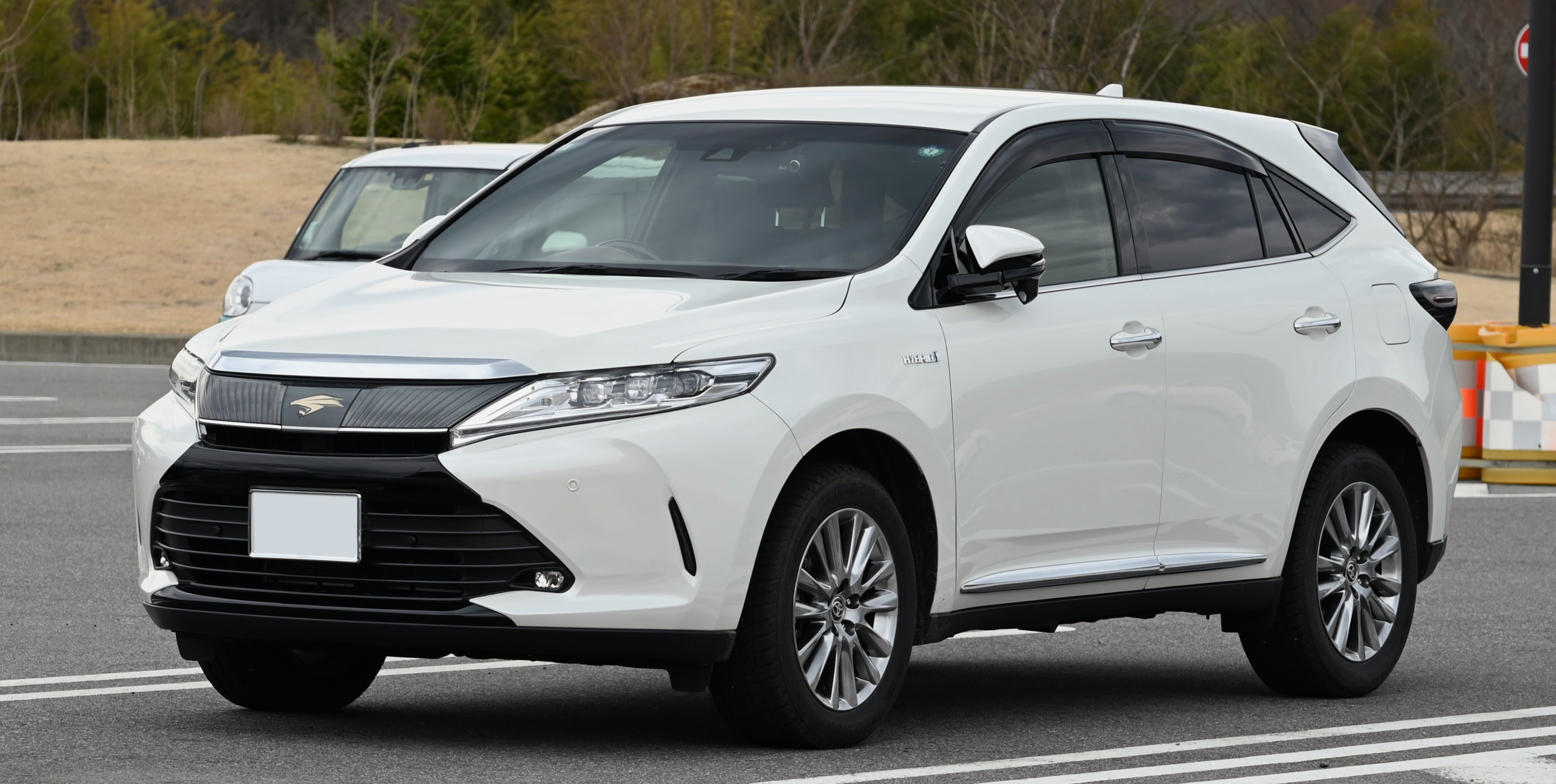
2017 Harrier Hybrid Premium (facelift)

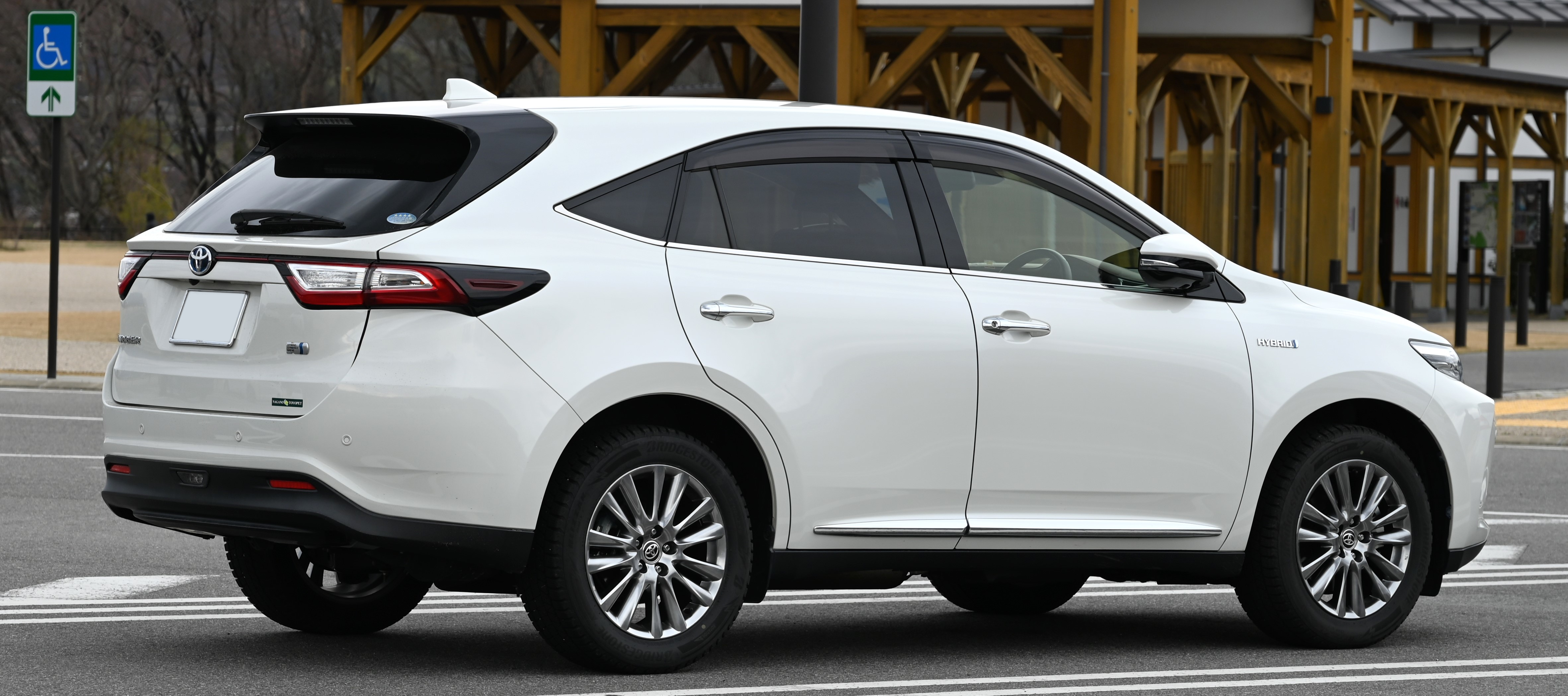
2017 Harrier Hybrid Premium (facelift)

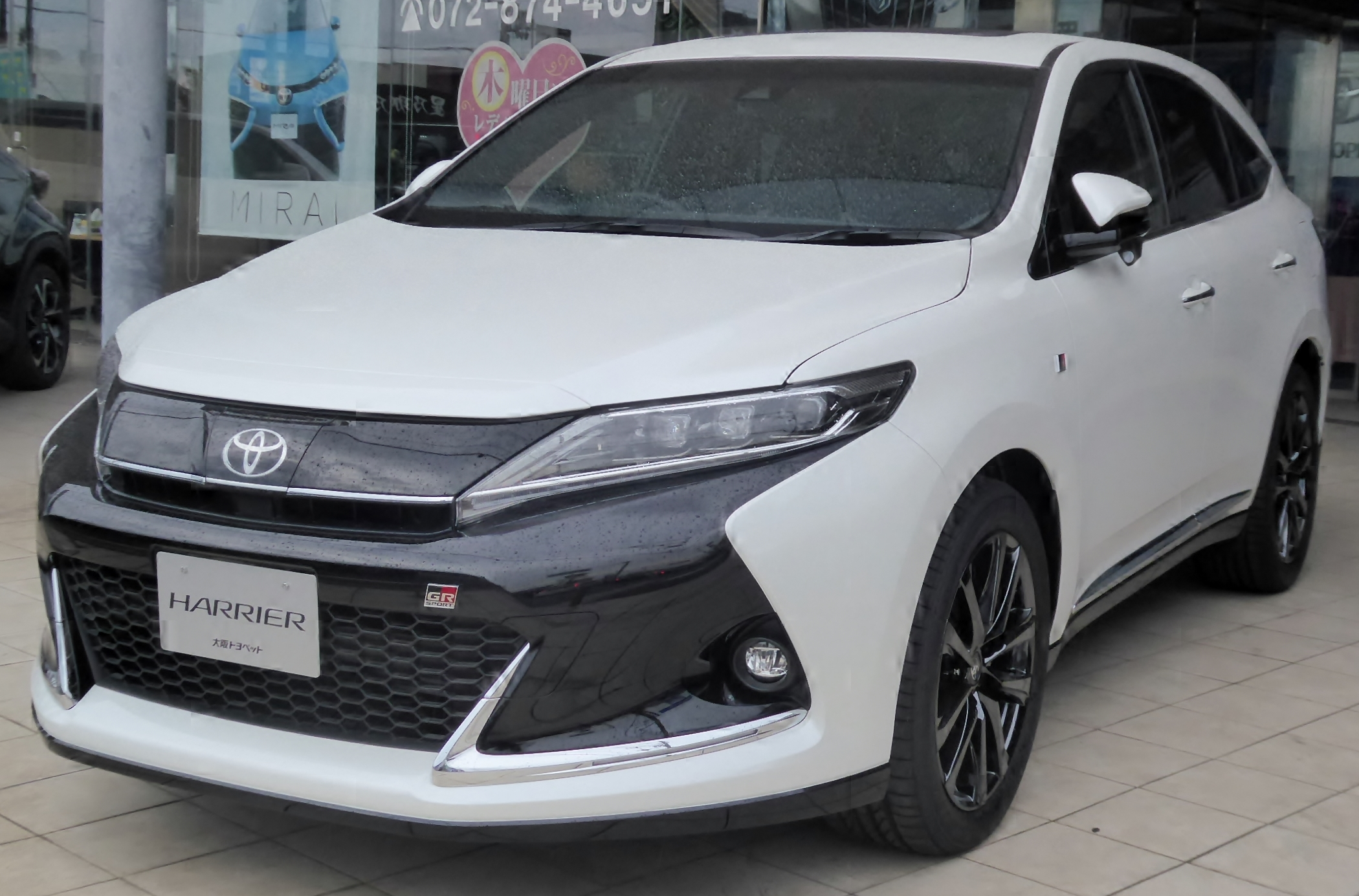
2018 Harrier Turbo Elegance GR Sport (ASU60W)

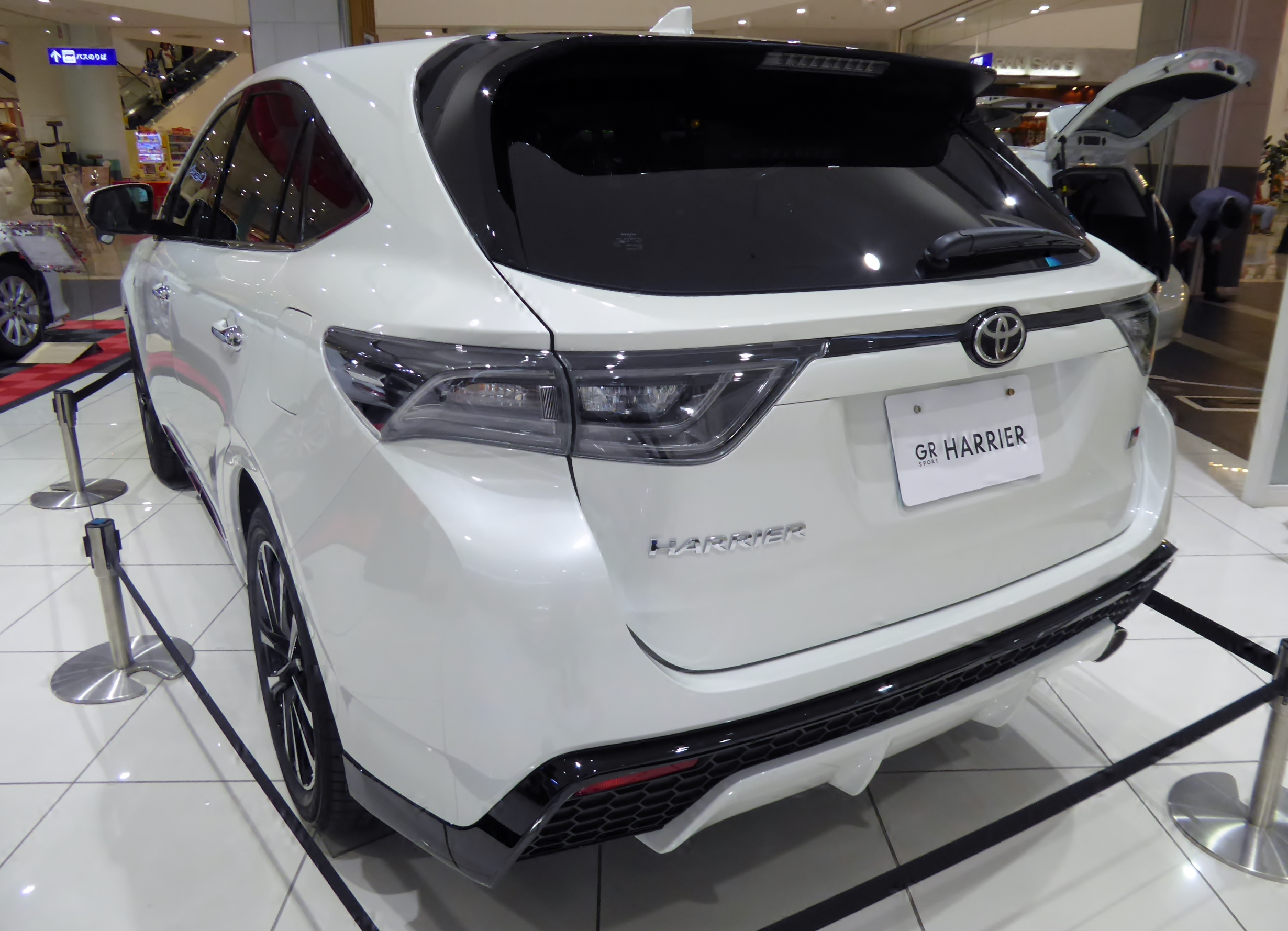
2017 Harrier Elegance GR Sport (ZSU60W)

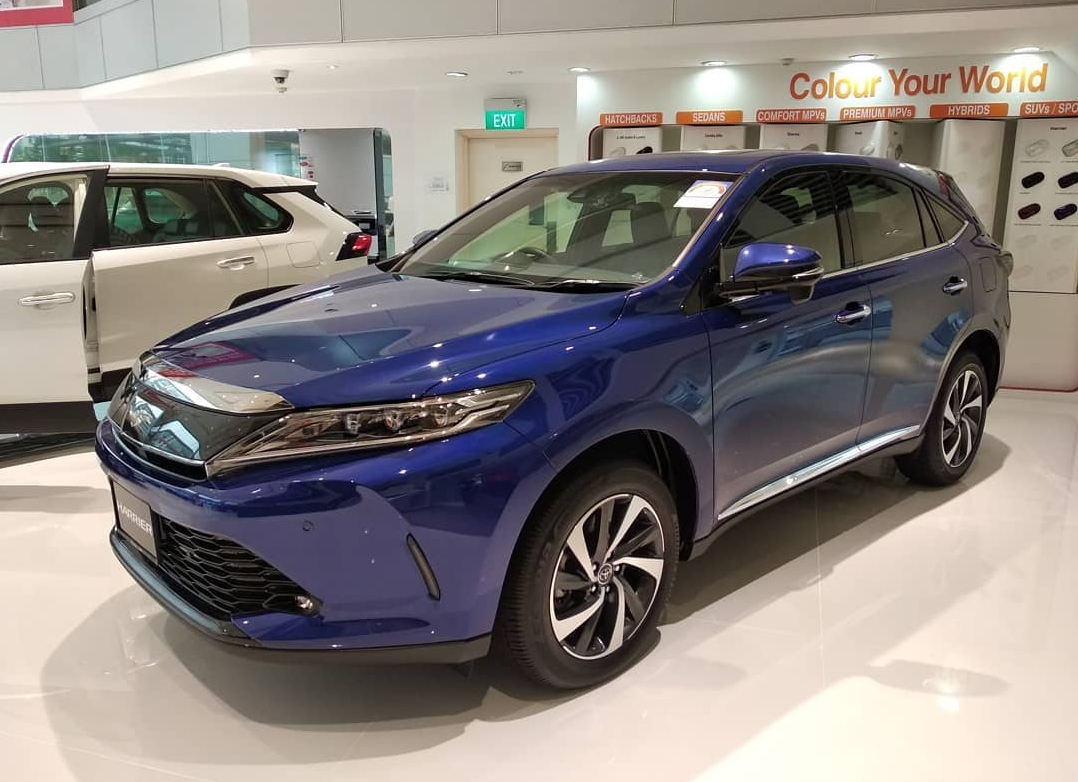
2019 Harrier 2.0 Turbo (Singapore).

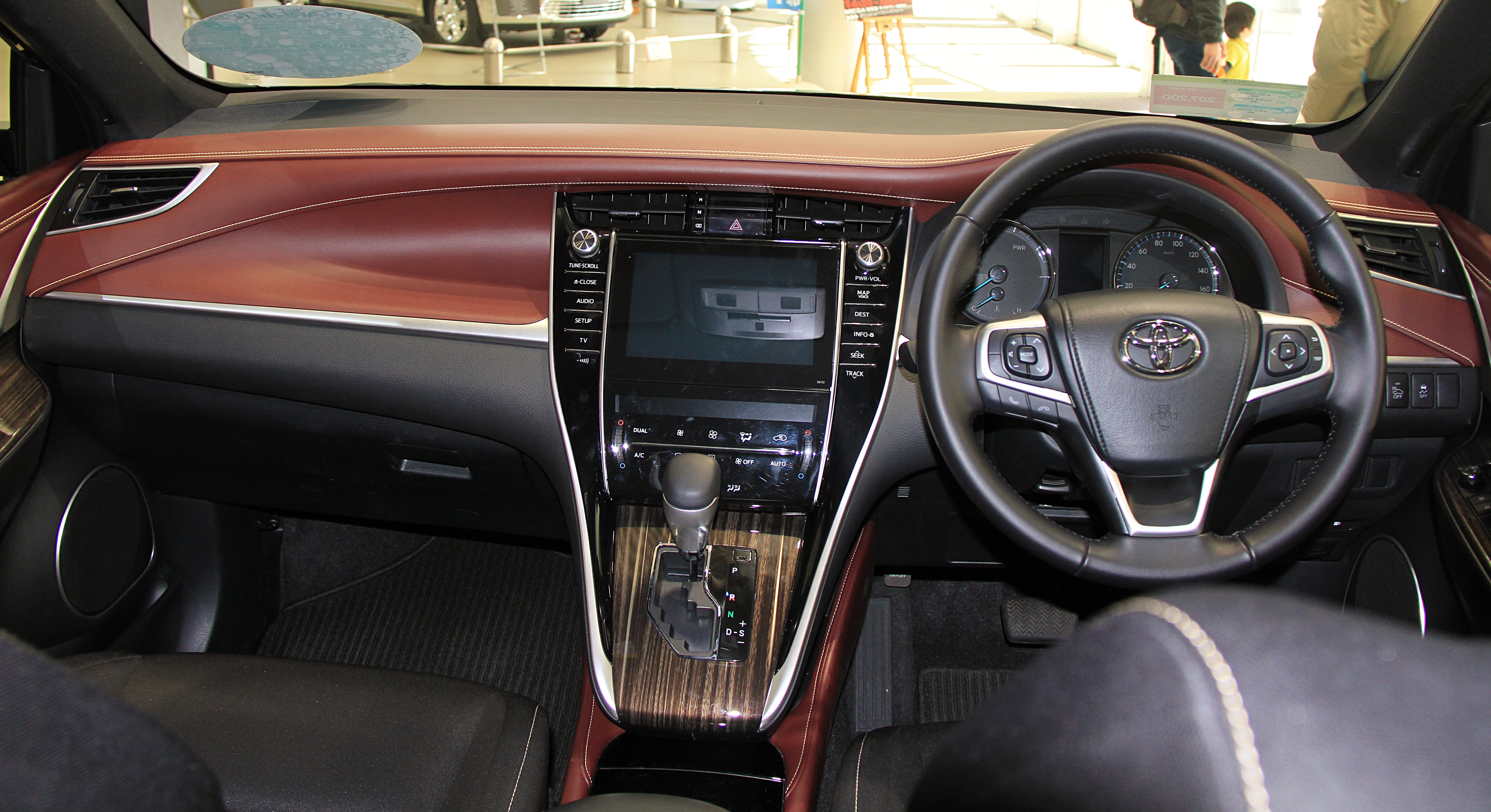
Interior (pre-facelift)

== Fourth generation (XU80; 2020) ==
Fourth generation
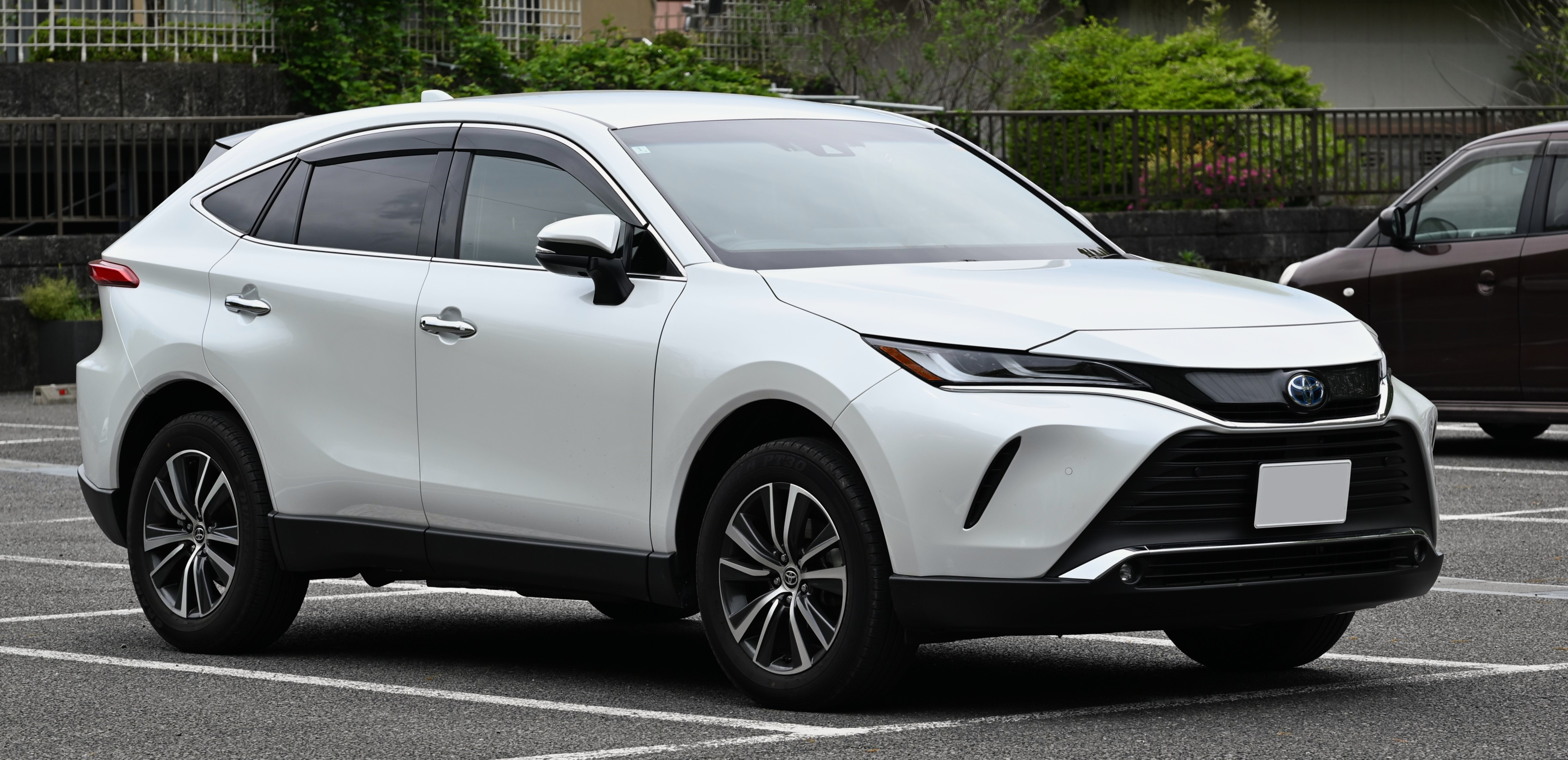
- Harrier Hybrid G (AXUH80)

Overview
- Model code: XU80
- Also called: Toyota Venza (North America; China, GAC Toyota)
- Production: June 2020 – present
- Assembly: Japan: Toyota City, Aichi (Takaoka plant); China: Changchun (FAW Toyota, 2021–2026)
- Designer: Nobuhiko Honda, Pansoo Kwon, Hideo Koyama and Daisuke Iguchi

Body and chassis
- Platform: TNGA: GA-K
- Related: Lexus NX (AZ20); Toyota RAV4 (XA50)

Powertrain
- Engine: Petrol: 1986 cc M20A-FKS I4 (MXUA80/85); 1986 cc M20D-FKS I4 (China); Petrol hybrid: 2487 cc A25A-FXS I4 (AXUH80/85); 2487 cc A25F-FXS I4 (China); Petrol plug-in hybrid: 2487 cc A25A-FXS I4 (AXUP80/85)
- Electric motor: 88 kW (118 hp; 120 PS) 3NM synchronous (front, hybrid); 40 kW (54 hp; 54 PS) 4NM synchronous (rear, hybrid); 134 kW (180 hp; 182 PS) 5NM + 40 kW (54 hp; 54 PS) 4NM (plug-in hybrid)
- Power output: 126 kW (169 hp; 171 PS) (M20A-FKS/M20D-FKS); 131 kW (176 hp; 178 PS) (A25A-FXS, petrol engine only); 160–163 kW (215–219 hp; 218–222 PS) (A25A-FXS, combined system output); 225 kW (302 hp; 306 PS) (plug-in hybrid, combined system output)
- Transmission: K120 CVT with physical first gear (petrol); eCVT (hybrid)
- Hybrid drivetrain: Power-split
- Battery: 1.6 kWh nickel–metal hydride (hybrid); 18.1 kWh lithium-ion (plug-in hybrid)

Dimensions
- Wheelbase: 2,690 mm (105.9 in)
- Length: 4,740 mm (186.6 in)
- Width: 1,855 mm (73.0 in)
- Height: 1,660 mm (65.4 in)
- Kerb weight: 1,620–1,770 kg (3,571–3,902 lb)

Chronology
- Successor: Toyota Crown Signia (North America)

The XU80 series Harrier was announced on 13 April 2020 and went on sale on 17 June 2020. It is built on the same GA-K platform as the XA50 series RAV4. Compared with the outgoing model, the width and the wheelbase is up by 20 mm (0.8 in) and 30 mm (1.2 in) respectively, while the height has been cut by 30 mm (1.2 in). Unlike the previous model, the turbocharged engine option is not available in this generation. It is available in S, G and Z grade levels in Japan. The Leather Package is also available in G and Z grades. Since the three generation Harrier, the Harrier emblem on the front grille that had been used since the first generation was changed to the Toyota emblem.

In other Asian markets, the fourth-generation Harrier was launched in Singapore on 29 January 2021. It is offered in Elegance trim with a regular petrol engine, and Premium and Luxury trims with a hybrid engine. It was also launched in Malaysia on 8 April 2021, offered in a single Luxury trim paired with the 2.0-litre M20A-FKS engine and CVT. The 2.5-litre A25A-FXS hybrid variant added in March 2026, hence the discontinuation of the 2.0-litre petrol variant. It is also offered in China under both Harrier and Venza nameplates.

In September 2022, the plug-in hybrid version was released in Japan in a sole Z grade level. It shares the same system with the RAV4 PHEV.

In June 2025, a plug-in hybrid variant was added to entry-level G grade. The G grade level became the base variant after the S grade level was discontinued. The Nightsade Package is also available in Z grade. The 12.3 inch head unit now is standard for all grades.

In August 2026, the Harrier received a minor update in Japan. The petrol and plug-in hybrid models were discontinued, therefore the Harrier line-up became hybrid-only in Japan. The remaining grades remain unchanged.

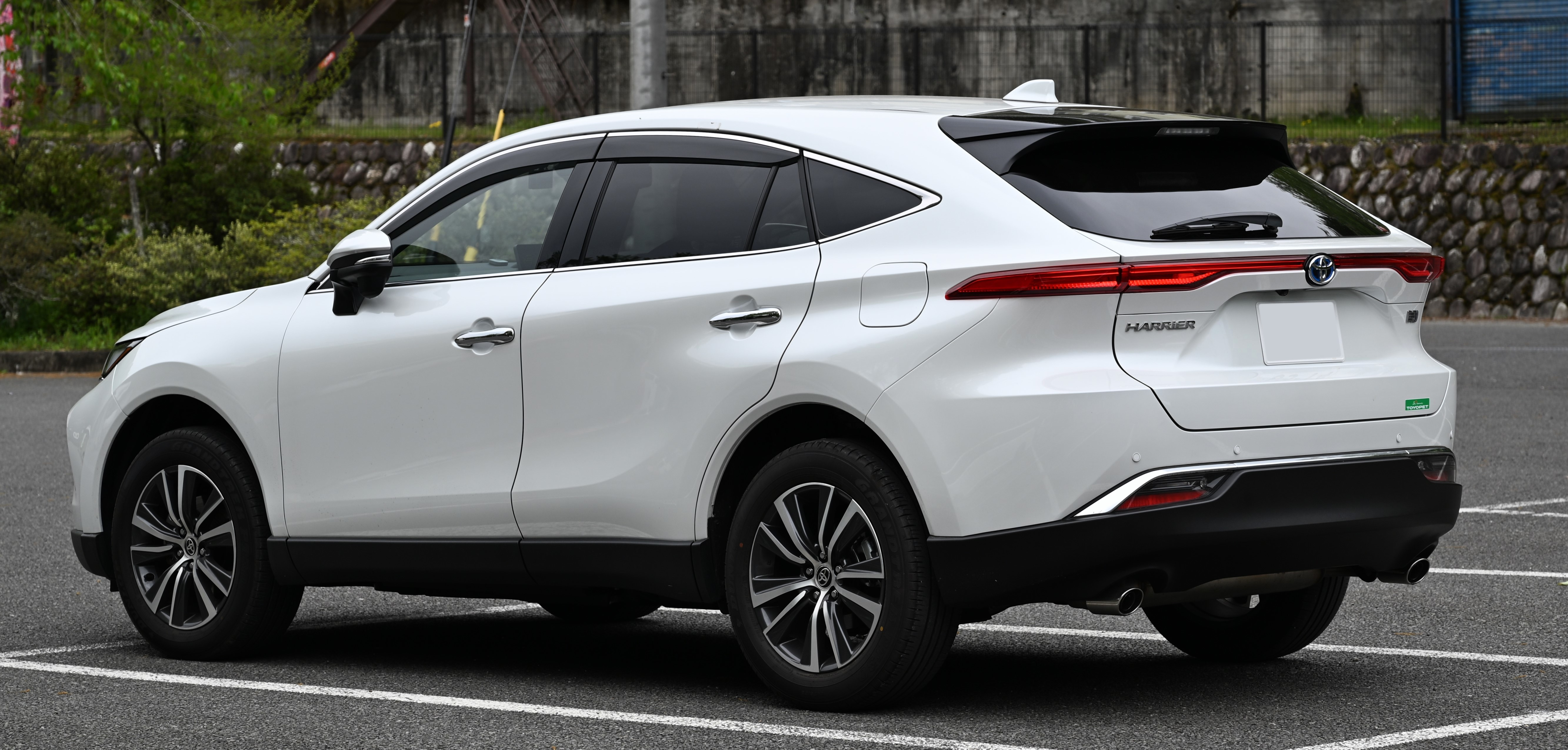
Harrier Hybrid G (AXUH80)

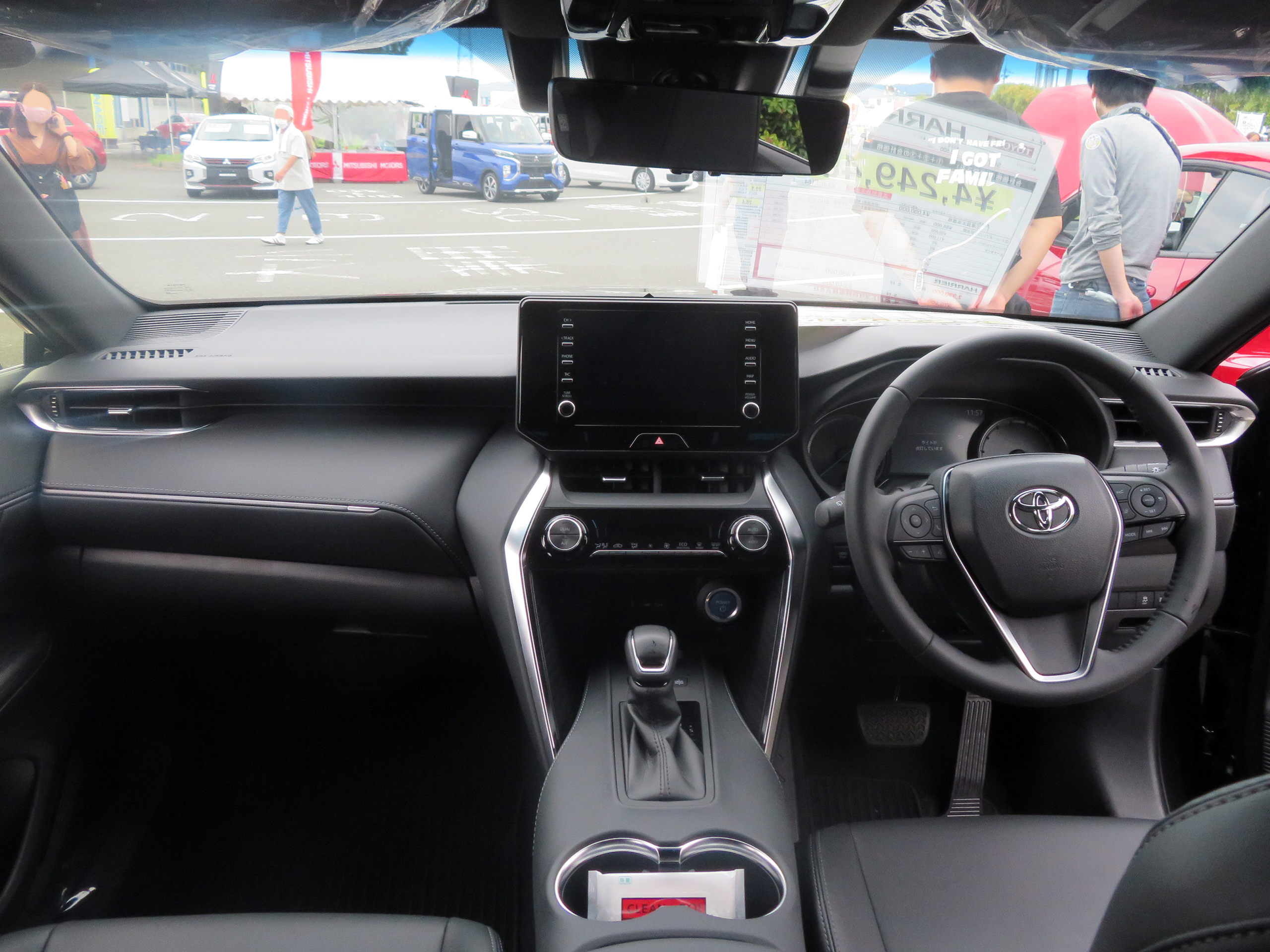
Toyota Harrier Hybrid G Interior

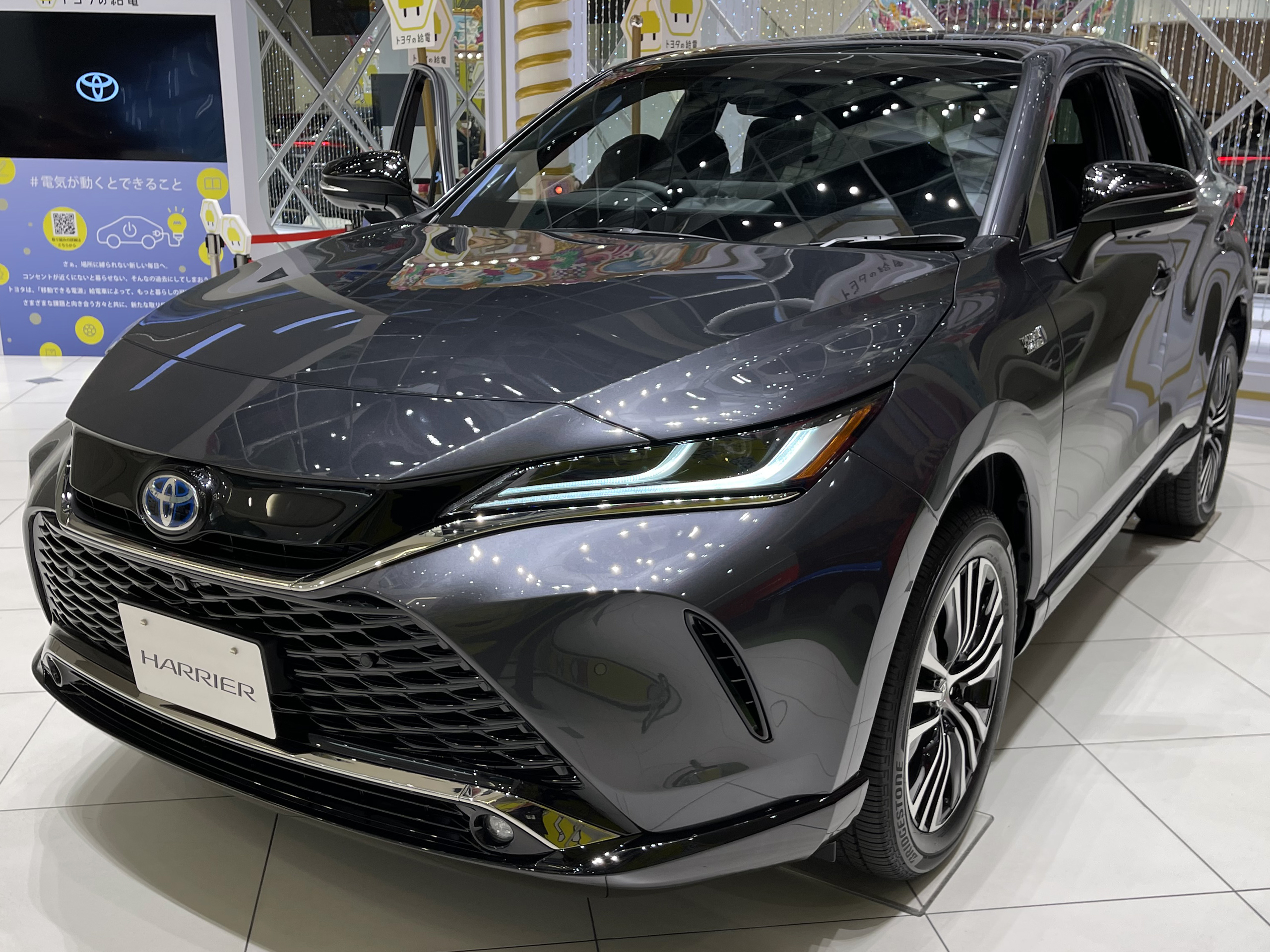
Toyota Harrier Plug-in Hybrid Z (AXUP85)

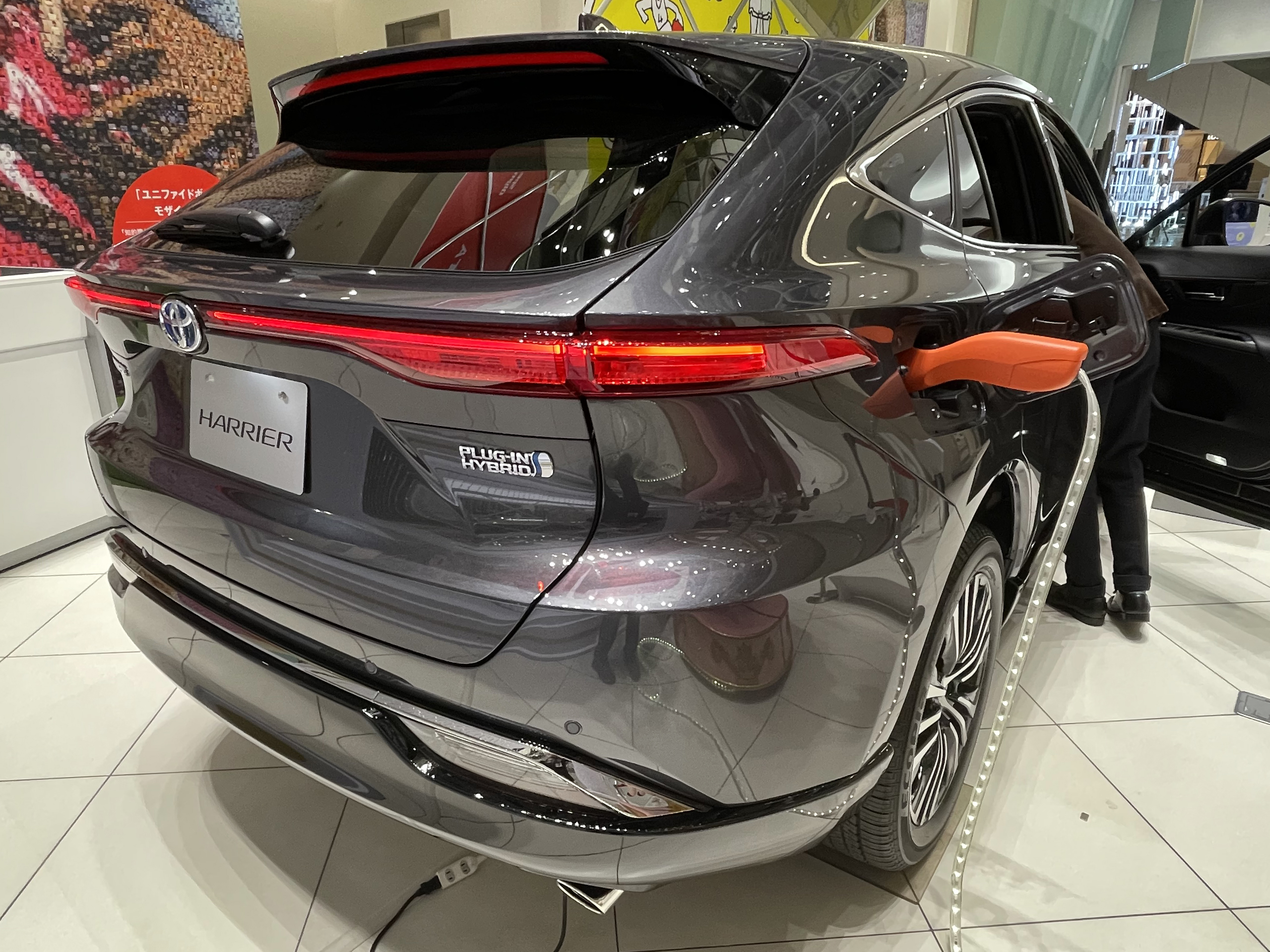
Toyota Harrier Plug-in Hybrid Z (AXUP85)

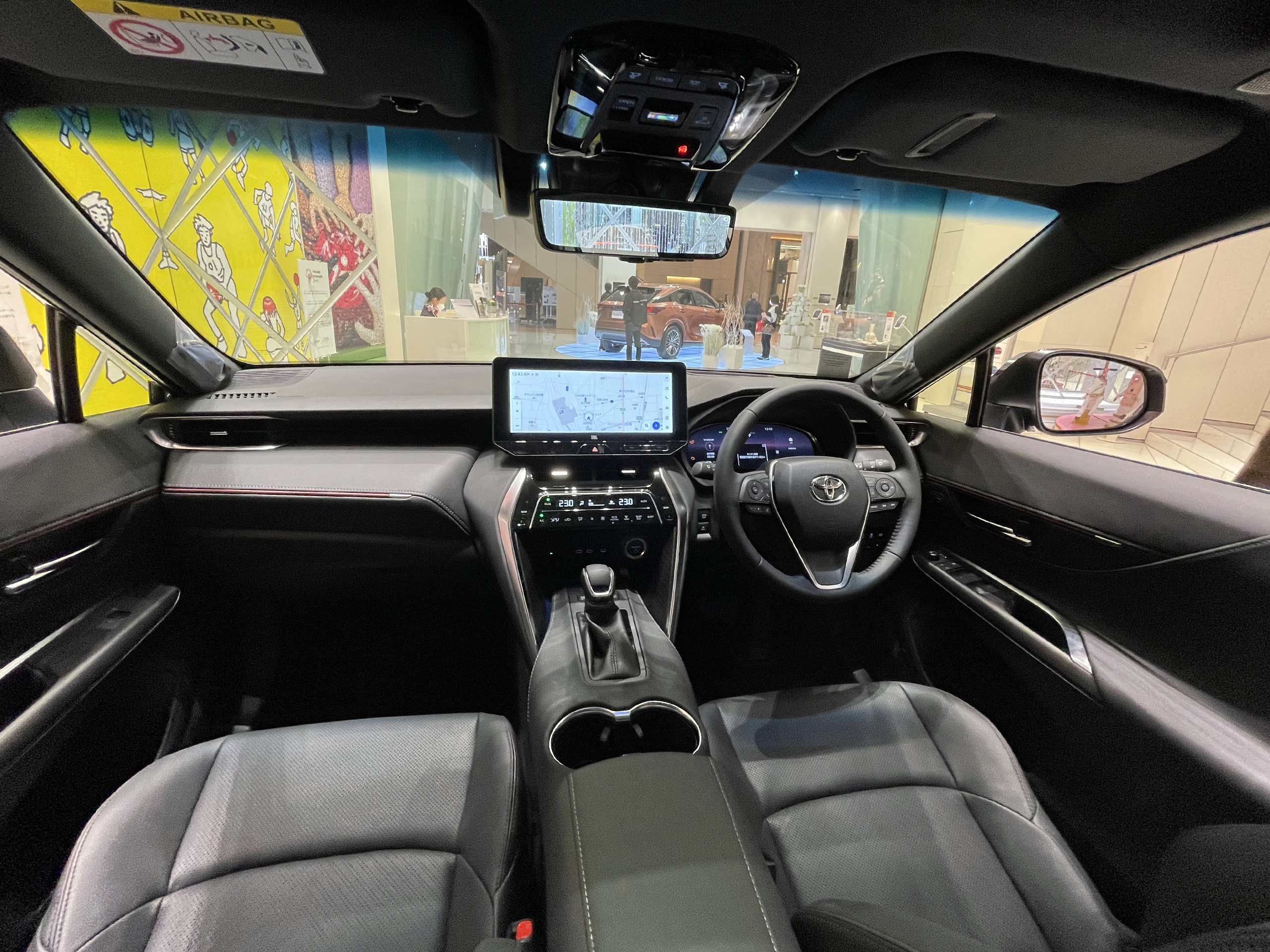
Toyota Harrier Plug-in Hybrid Z interior

=== Venza ===
The Harrier was unveiled in North America as the second-generation Venza on 18 May 2020. The Venza for this market is only available in an all-wheel drive hybrid powertrain. It went on sale in September 2020. Unlike the Harrier, it lacks the grille-mounted fog lamps on all trims. The second-generation Venza for North American market is built alongside the Harrier in Japan at the Takaoka plant, as opposed to the first-generation model which was built in the United States at Toyota Motor Manufacturing Kentucky. It is offered in LE, XLE and Limited trims.

The Venza is also sold in China by GAC Toyota and produced at the Guangzhou factory. The front fascia differs from the Harrier that is also sold there by FAW Toyota, being produced at the Tianjin factory, making China the only country that offers both the Venza and Harrier models.

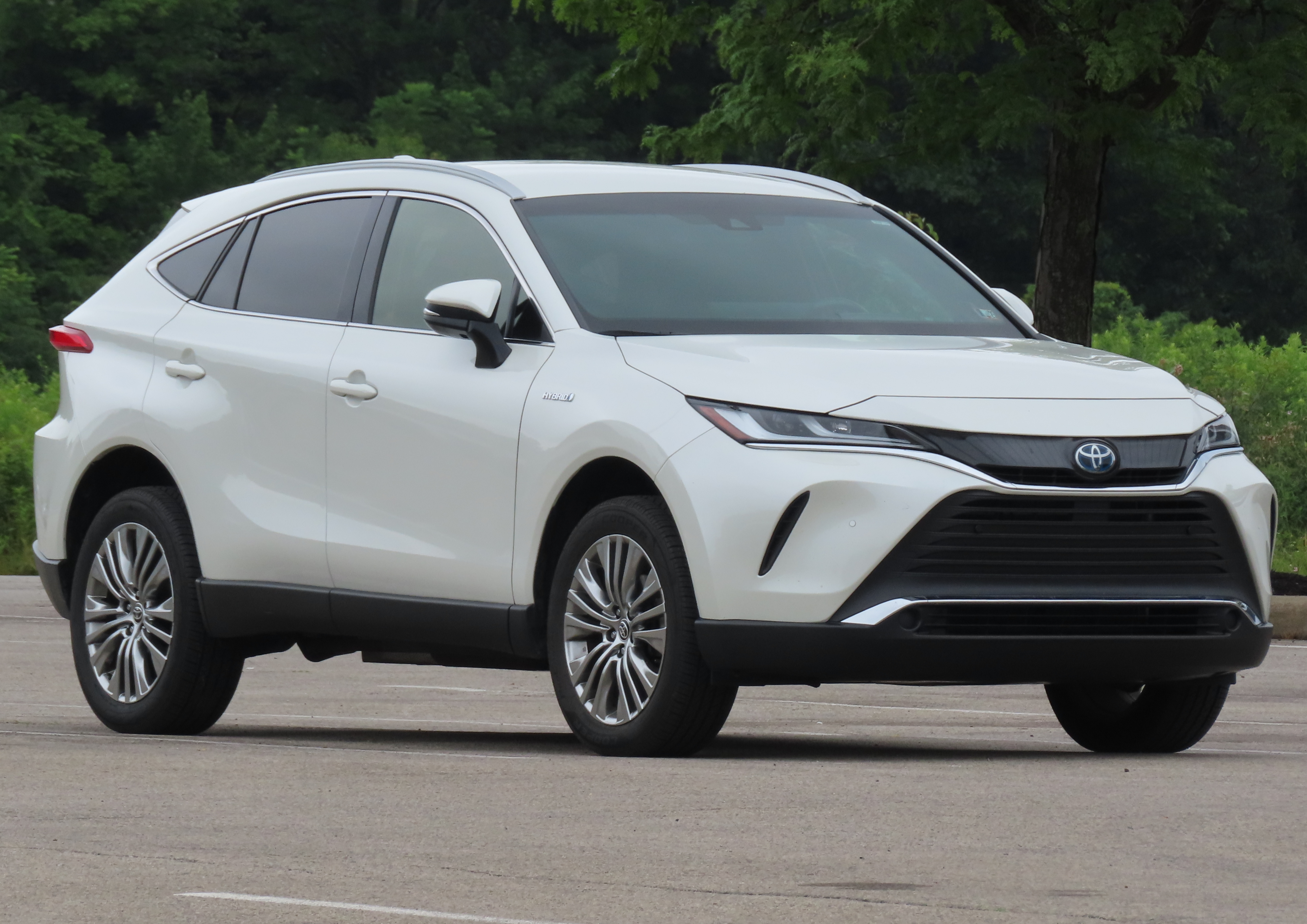
2021 Venza XLE (AXUH85)

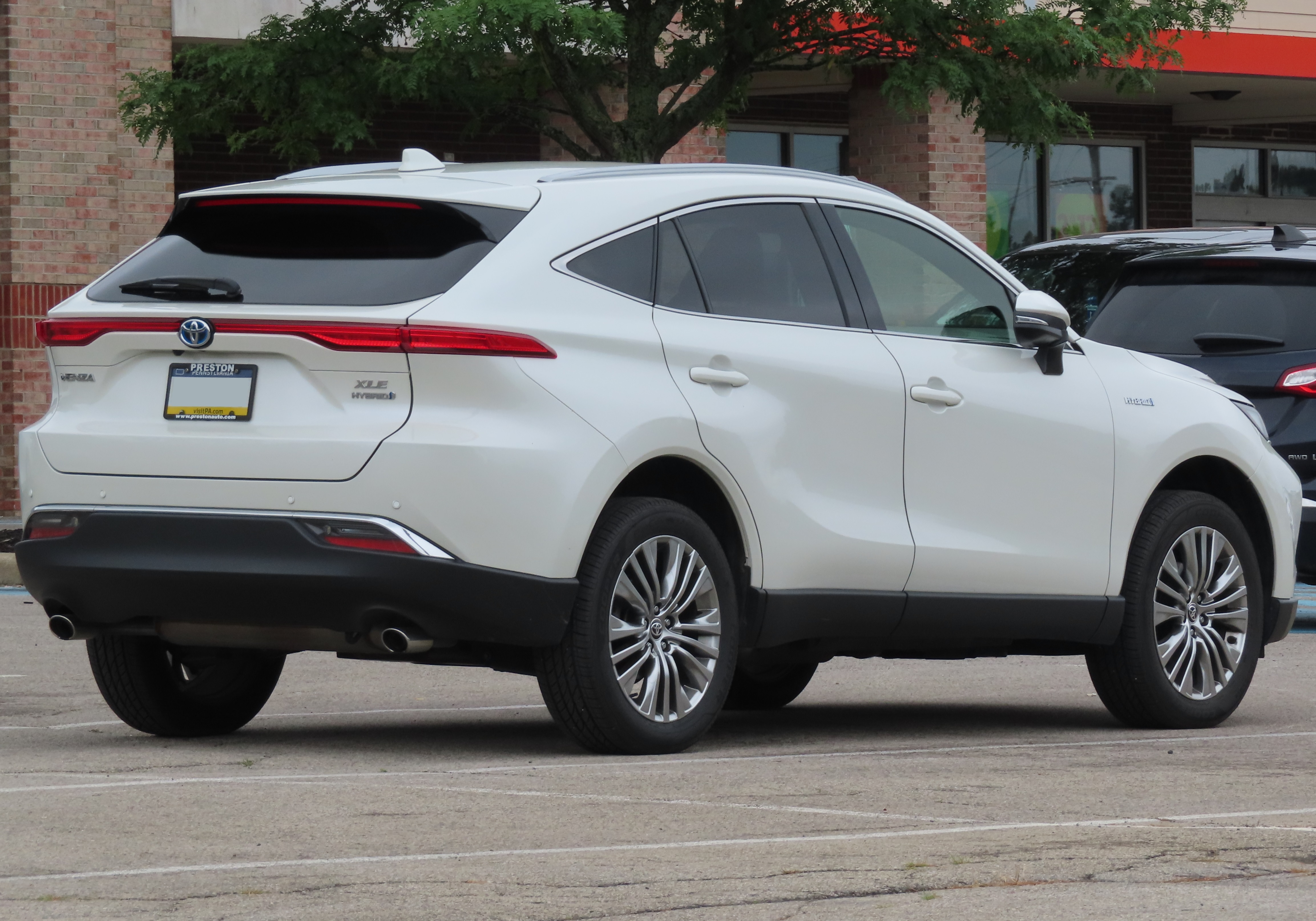
2021 Venza XLE (AXUH85)

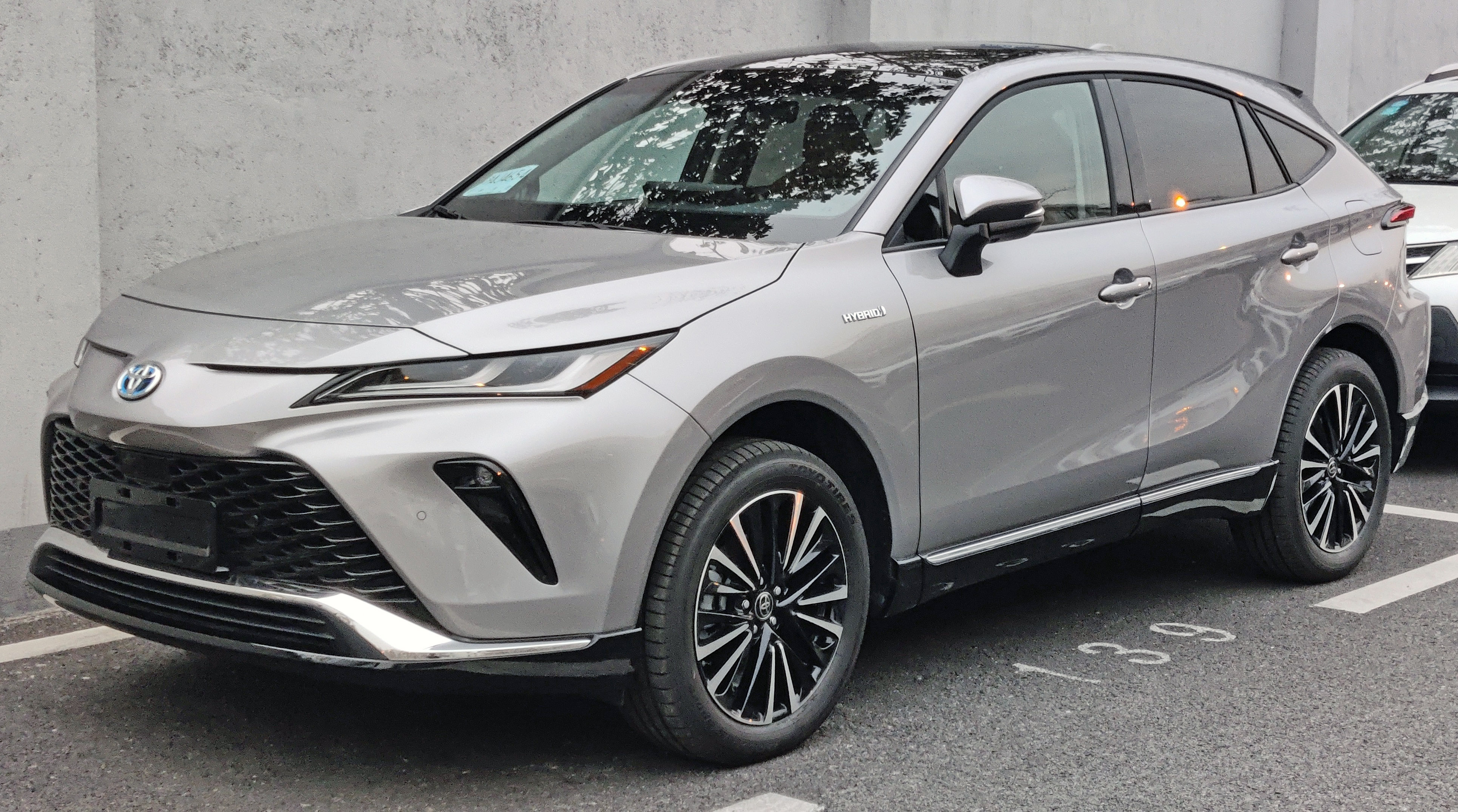
Chinese-market Venza

=== Engines ===
Chassis code	Engine	Transmission	Power	Torque	Year of availability
Petrol engines
MXUA80 (FWD); MXUA85 (4WD)	1,986 cc M20A-FKS/M20D-FKS DOHC 16-valve EFI straight-four with Dual VVT-iE and D-4S	Direct Shift-CVT	126 kW (169 hp; 171 PS) at 6,600 rpm	207 N⋅m (153 lb⋅ft) at 4,800 rpm	2020–present
Hybrid engines
AXUH80 (FWD); AXUH85 (4WD)	2,487 cc A25A-FXS DOHC 16-valve EFI straight-four with Dual VVT-iE and D-4S	eCVT	131 kW (176 hp; 178 PS) at 5,700 rpm	221 N⋅m (163 lb⋅ft) at 3,600–5,200 rpm	2020–present

== Sales ==
Year	Japan	Malaysia (Note: Figures based on registration, includes grey imports and used car imports (Malaysia))	China
1998	49,954		
1999	34,087		
2000		863	
2001	17,198	1,615	
2002	9,520	2,657	
2003	28,686	3,320	
2004	26,222	3,395	
2005	25,525	2,660	
2006	28,040	1,650	
2007	33,923	2,361	
2008	26,920	2,283	
2009	14,375	1,945	
2010	11,239	2,326	
2011	8,117	1,820	
2012	5,790	1,591	
2013	1,937	1,298	
2014	64,920	941	
2015	58,991	1,801	
2016	41,403	2,102	
2017	58,732	1,435	
2018	44,952	2,647	
2019	36,249	2,593	
2020	66,067	1,983	
2021	74,575	2,573	
2022	34,182	4,014	
2023	75,211	4,459	25,319
2024	64,181	6,315	11,323
2025	52,653	4,829	3,989

== See also ==
- List of Toyota vehicles
