= Toyota AR engine =

Toyota 4-cylinder engine introduced in 2008

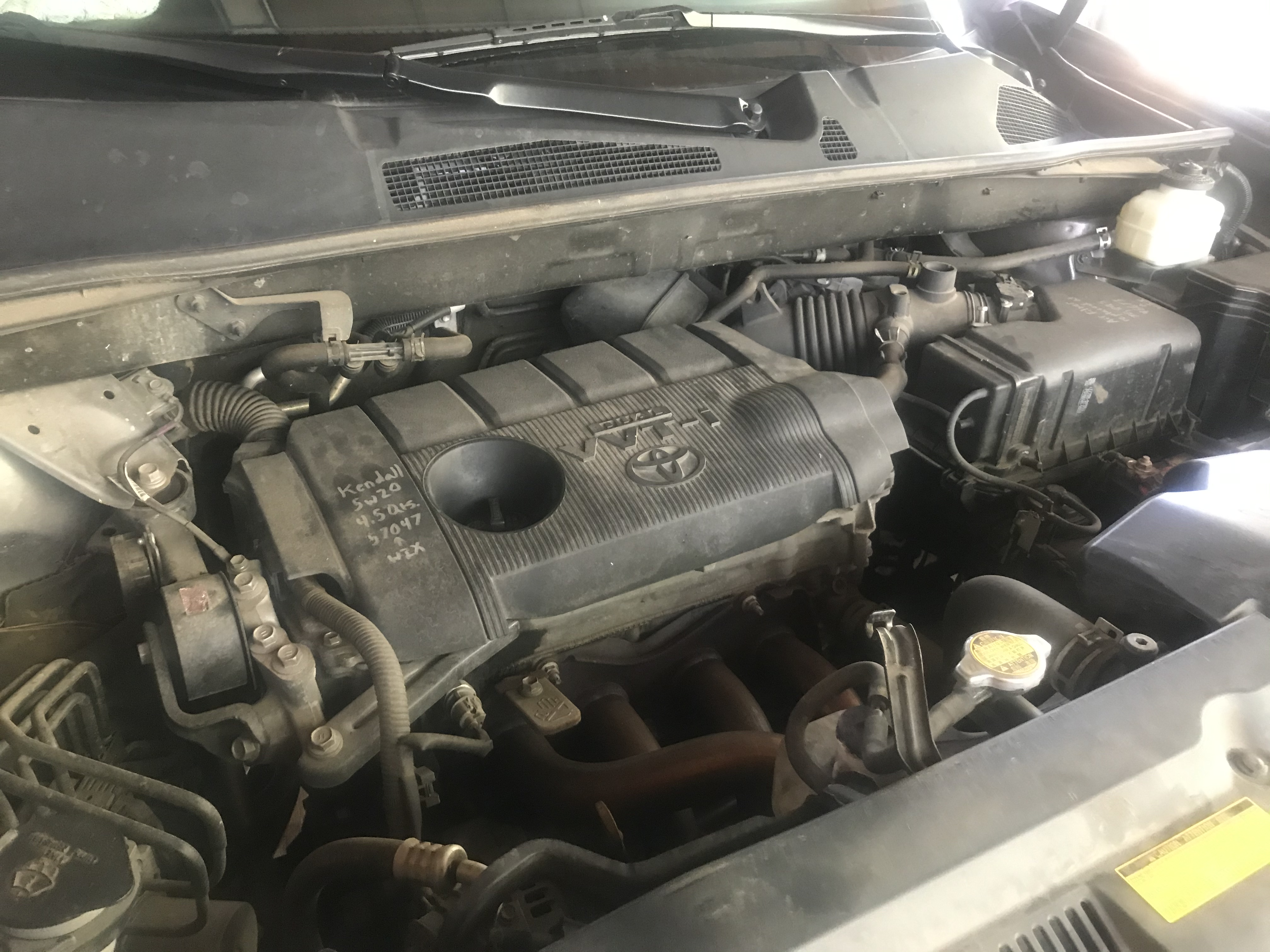
- Toyota 1AR-FE engine

Overview
- Manufacturer: Toyota
- Production: 2008–present

Layout
- Configuration: Inline-4

Chronology
- Predecessor: Toyota AZ engine; Toyota S engine
- Successor: Toyota A25A engine (for 1AR, 2AR and 5AR series); Toyota M20A engine (6AR-FSE); Toyota S20A engine (8AR-FTS, for China); Toyota T24A engine (8AR-FTS, for international)

The AR engine family is an inline-4 piston engine series by Toyota, first introduced in 2008 for the RAV4, and subsequently for the Highlander, Venza, Camry and Scion tC. All AR engines feature timing chains rather than timing belts.

The AR series uses a die-cast aluminium engine block and aluminium DOHC cylinder head. The engine series shares many of the technologies in the AZ engine, while incorporating features such as variable valve timing on both intake and exhaust camshafts or dual VVT-i, low friction technologies including an offset crankshaft, roller rockers for the valvetrain, a three-stage variable oil pump, reduced-tension piston rings and auxiliary belt drive. An Acoustic Control Induction System switches the length of the intake tract in two stages, based on rpm and throttle angle, thereby ensuring strong torque across a broad engine speed range. New tumble control valves enhance combustion while the engine is cold, and help to bring the catalytic converters up to working temperature quickly. The Tumble control valves, along with new 12-hole high atomizing long-nozzle fuel injectors, reduce the amount of fuel adhering to the intake ports and therefore maximize fuel economy and reduce harmful emissions.

The cylinder block is an open-deck, midi-skirt type with cast-in iron liners and a die-cast aluminium lower crankcase and a stamped oil pan. The forged steel crankshaft is fully balanced with eight counterweights and supported by five main bearings. A helical gear pressed in No. 3 counterweight drives twin contra-rotating balance shafts in the shaft housing within the lower crankcase.

The AR engine replaces the AZ engine.

== 1AR-FE ==
1AR-FE

Overview
- Manufacturer: Toyota
- Production: 2008-2020 (Unofficial end date)

Layout
- Displacement: 2,672 cc (163.1 cu in)
- Cylinder bore: 90 mm (3.543 in)
- Piston stroke: 105 mm (4.134 in)
- Cylinder block material: Aluminium alloy
- Cylinder head material: Aluminium alloy
- Valvetrain: DOHC
- Compression ratio: 10.0:1

Combustion
- Fuel system: EFI
- Fuel type: Petrol (gasoline)
- Cooling system: Water cooled

Output
- Power output: 182–187 bhp (136–139 kW)
- Torque output: 182–186 lb⋅ft (247–252 N⋅m)

A 2.7 L version of the AR family, first released in the Venza and Highlander in late 2008.

The 1AR-FE most likely ended production in 2020. No official statements were made by Toyota about the engine's status, however, no new cars used this engine after 2020. It was replaced by the A25A-FKS engine.

=== Applications ===
- Toyota Venza AGV10/15, 185 PS (136 kW; 182 hp) at 5800 rpm, 247 N⋅m (182 lbf⋅ft) at 4200 rpm
- Toyota Highlander ASU40, 190 PS (140 kW; 187 hp) at 5800 rpm, 252 N⋅m (186 lbf⋅ft) at 4100 rpm
- Toyota Highlander ASU50
- Toyota Sienna ASU40, 190 PS (140 kW; 187 hp) at 5800 rpm, 252 N⋅m (186 lbf⋅ft) at 4100 rpm
- Lexus RX AGL10, 138 kW (188 PS) at 5800 rpm, 252 N⋅m (186 lbf⋅ft) at 4200 rpm

== 2AR-FE ==
2AR-FE
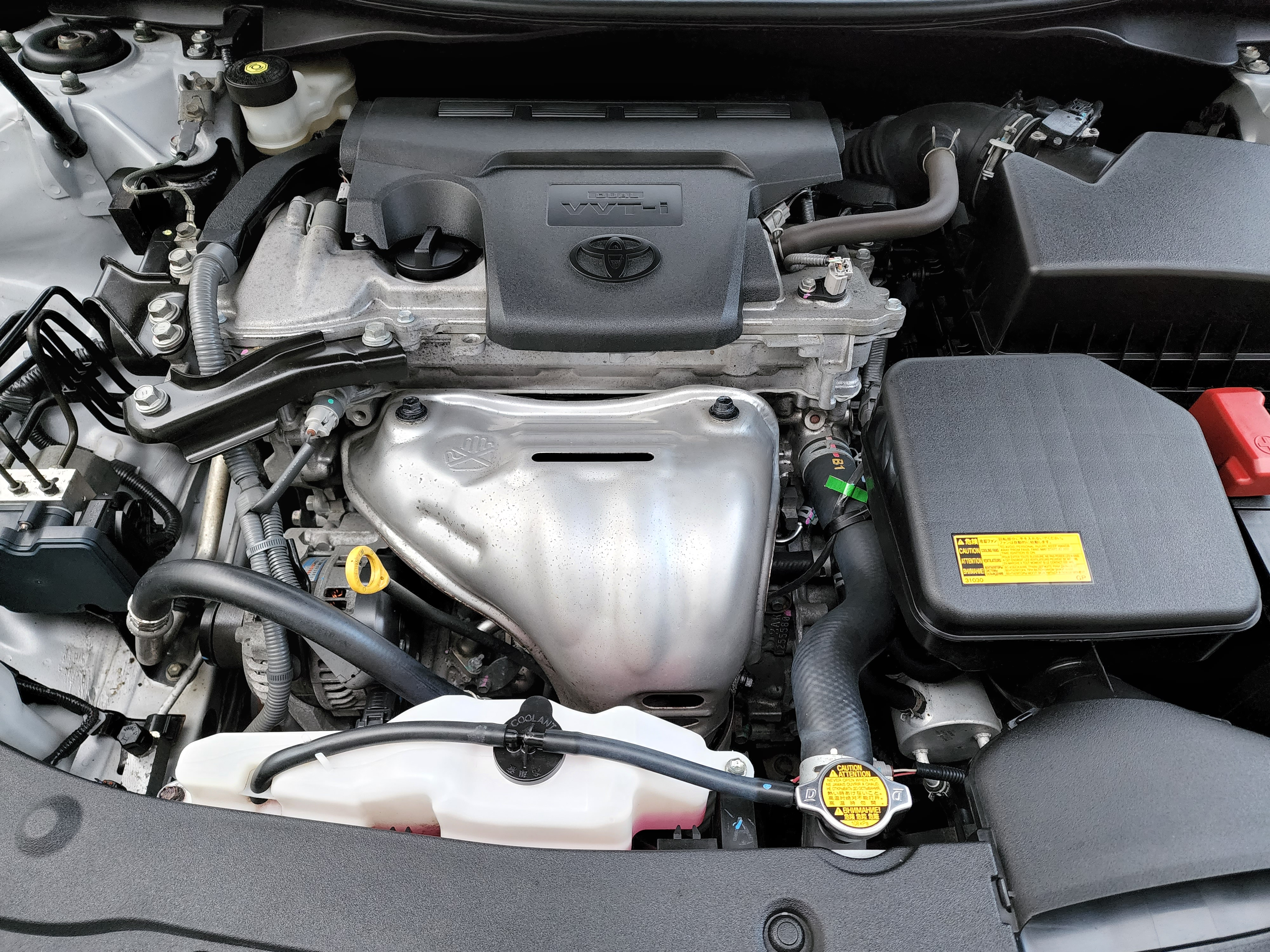
- 2AR-FE inside a 2015 Toyota Camry Atara S (XV50; Australasian model).

Overview
- Manufacturer: Toyota

Layout
- Displacement: 2,494 cc (152.2 cu in)
- Cylinder bore: 90 mm (3.543 in)
- Piston stroke: 98 mm (3.858 in)
- Cylinder block material: Aluminium alloy
- Cylinder head material: Aluminium alloy
- Valvetrain: DOHC
- Compression ratio: 10.4:1

Combustion
- Fuel system: EFI
- Fuel type: Petrol (gasoline)

Output
- Power output: 169–180 bhp (126–134 kW)
- Torque output: 167–173 lb⋅ft (226–235 N⋅m)

A 2.5 L version of the AR family, first released in the RAV4 in the U.S. and Canada in 2008. This engine also replaced the 2AZ-FE in the U.S. and Canada Camry in early 2009, giving 11% better fuel economy. The engine service mass is 324 lb (147 kg) that includes the oil and coolant fully filled. The engine is used in vehicles sold in Japan, U.S., Australia, New Zealand, China, Taiwan, Korea, Malaysia, Philippines, Thailand Indonesia, and Middle East.

=== Applications ===
- Toyota RAV4 (ASA33/38), 181 PS (133 kW; 179 hp) at 6000 rpm, 233 N⋅m (172 lbf⋅ft) at 4000 rpm
- Toyota RAV4 (ASA40/44), 178 PS (131 kW; 176 hp) at 6000 rpm, 233 N⋅m (172 lbf⋅ft) at 4000 rpm
- Toyota Camry ASV40 (Base & LE), 171 PS (126 kW; 169 hp) at 6000 rpm, 226 N⋅m (167 lbf⋅ft) at 4100 rpm
- Toyota Camry ASV40 (SE and worldwide) 181 PS (133 kW; 179 hp) at 6000 rpm, 233 N⋅m (172 lbf⋅ft) at 4100 rpm
- Toyota Camry ASV50, 180 PS (132 kW; 178 hp) at 6000 rpm, 233 N⋅m (172 lbf⋅ft) at 4100 rpm
- Scion tC (AGT20), 180 hp (130 kW), 173 lb⋅ft (235 N⋅m)
- Toyota Alphard/Vellfire AH30, 182 PS (134 kW; 180 hp) at 6000 rpm, 235 N⋅m (173 lbf⋅ft) at 4100 rpm
- Toyota Alphard/Vellfire (AGH40/45), 182 PS (134 kW; 180 hp) at 6000 rpm, 235 N⋅m (173 lbf⋅ft) at 4100 rpm
- Lexus ES 250 (ASV60)

== 2AR-FXE ==
The 2AR-FXE is an Atkinson cycle variant of the 2AR-FE. It has the same bore and stroke, but the cams and pistons are unique. Only the intake valves are variable with VVT-i. Geometrical compression ratio is 12.5:1.

The large valve overlap leads to a reduction in cylinder charge and reduced torque and power output, but efficiency is increased. This combination makes the 2AR-FXE suitable for use in hybrid vehicles, where peak torque and power demands can be met by the electric motor and battery. Maximum output of the engine when used in the Camry hybrid is 154 hp (115 kW) with 153 lb⋅ft (207 N⋅m) of torque.

The South East Asian Market 2AR-FXE engines does not have EGR systems.

=== Applications ===
- Toyota Camry Hybrid (AVV50)
- Toyota Avalon Hybrid (XX40)
- Toyota Harrier Hybrid (XU60)
- Lexus NX 300h (AZ10)
- Toyota Alphard/Vellfire Hybrid/Crown Vellfire (AH30)
- Lexus ES 300h (XV60)
- Toyota RAV4 Hybrid (XA40)
- Lexus LM 300h (AH30)

== 2AR-FSE ==
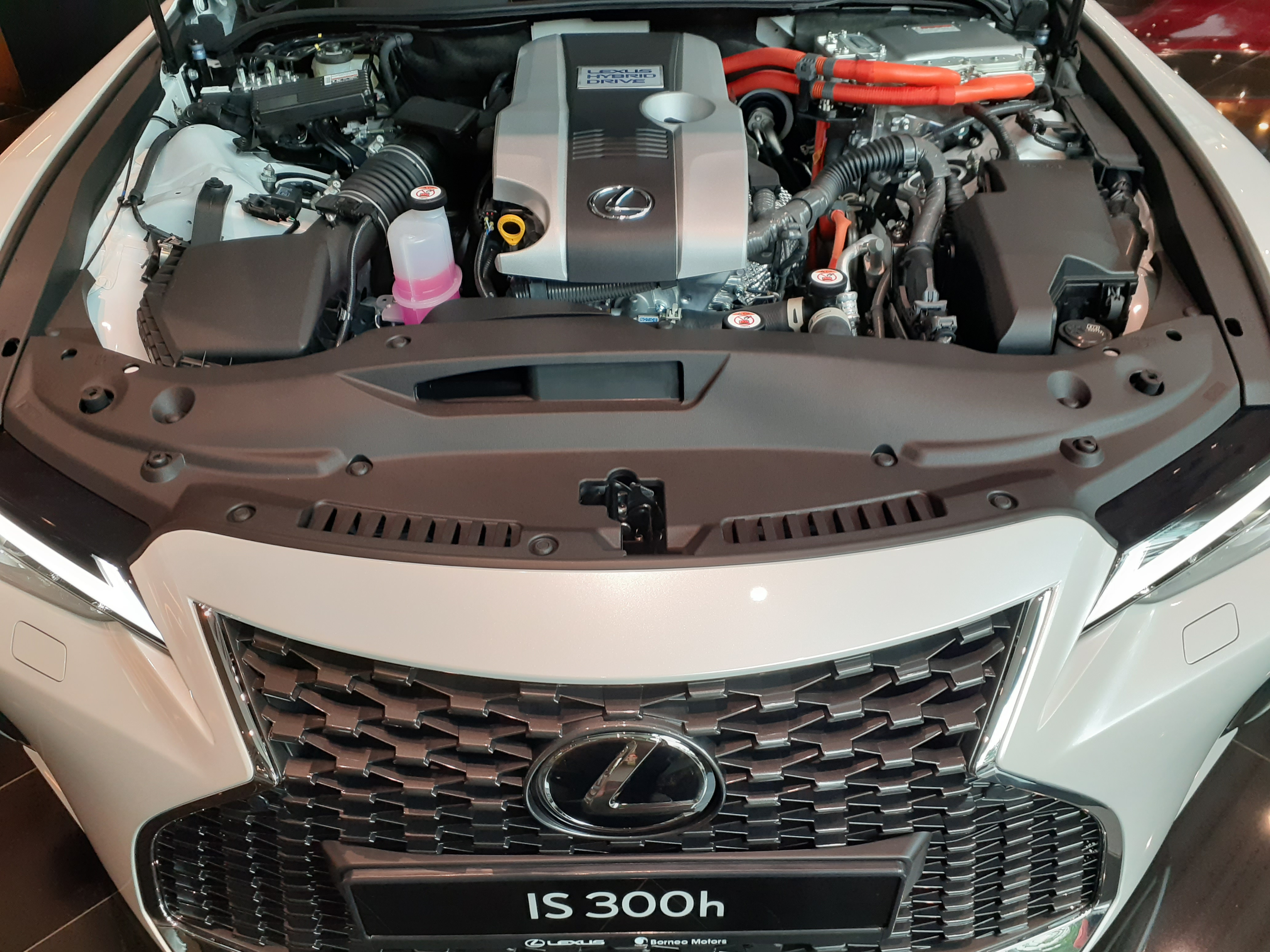
2AR-FSE engine in a Lexus IS 300h (AVE30)

The 2AR-FSE is a variant of the 2AR-FE equipped with D4-S direct-injection and port injection. It has the same bore and stroke as other 2AR engines but the cylinder head, cams, pistons and fuel management system are unique. Maximum thermal efficiency is about 38.5%. The expansion ratio is 13.0 to 1.

Output in the Toyota Crown hybrid combined is 164 kW (220 hp) at 6000 rpm and 221 N⋅m (163 lbf⋅ft) at 4200–5400 rpm.

=== Applications ===
- Lexus GS 300h
- Lexus IS 300h
- Lexus RC 300h
- Toyota Crown (S210)

== 5AR-FE ==
5AR-FE

Overview
- Manufacturer: Toyota

Layout
- Displacement: 2,494 cc (152.2 cu in)
- Cylinder bore: 90 mm (3.543 in)
- Piston stroke: 98 mm (3.858 in)
- Cylinder block material: Aluminium alloy
- Cylinder head material: Aluminium alloy
- Valvetrain: DOHC
- Compression ratio: 10.4:1

Combustion
- Fuel system: EFI
- Fuel type: Petrol (gasoline)

Output
- Power output: 177 hp (132 kW)
- Torque output: 173 lb⋅ft (235 N⋅m)

A 2.5 L version of the AR family, first released in the RAV4 in China in 2013.

=== Applications ===
- Toyota RAV4
- Toyota Camry

== 6AR-FSE ==
The 6AR-FSE is a 4-cylinder, 1998 cc, twincam, petrol engine equipped with D4-S direct fuel injection and VVT-iW. It can work in the Otto cycle and a modified-Atkinson cycle depending on output power. It was first introduced in the Camry in December 2014 for the Chinese market and March 2015 for the Thai market. The output of 6AR-FSE is 123 kW (165 bhp) at 6500 rpm and 199 N⋅m (147 lbf⋅ft) at 4600 rpm. The stroke and bore are 86 mm × 86 mm (3.4 in × 3.4 in).

=== Applications ===
- Camry 2.0 (XV50, Russia, China, Thailand)
- Camry 2.0 (XV70, Myanmar, Vietnam, Cambodia, Kazakhstan models, and China only in 2017–2018)
- Lexus ES 200 (XV60)

== 6AR-FBS ==
The 6AR-FBS is a 4-cylinder, 1998 cc, twincam, petrol engine equipped with D4-S direct fuel injection and VVT-iW. It can work in the Otto cycle and a modified-Atkinson cycle depending on output power. It was first introduced in the Camry in October 2018 for the Thai market.

The output is 167 PS (123 kW; 165 bhp) at 6500 rpm and 199 N⋅m (147 lbf⋅ft) at 4600 rpm.

=== Applications ===
- Camry 2.0 (XV70, Russia, Thailand, Singapore, China)

== 8AR-FTS ==
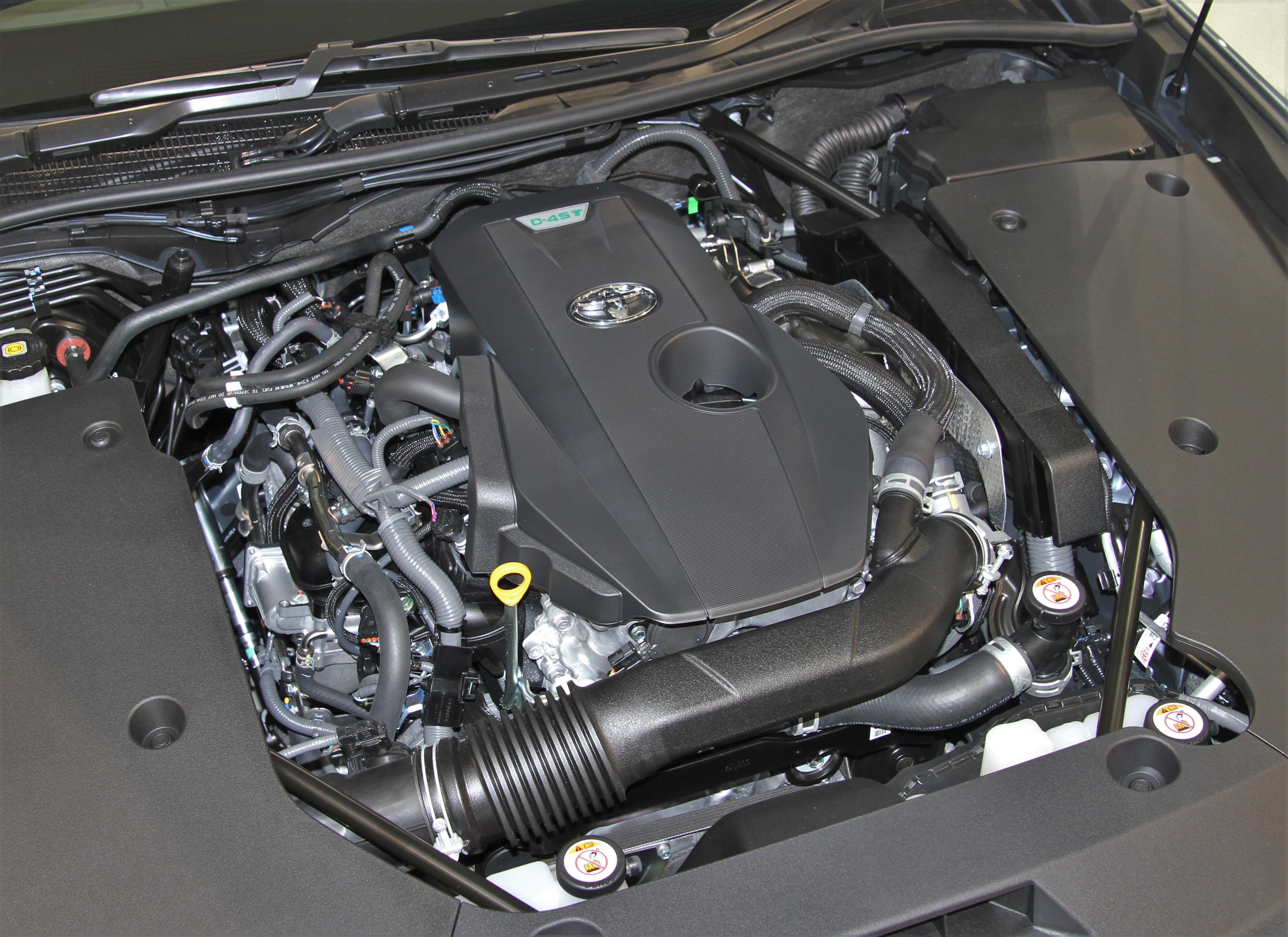
The 8AR-FTS engine in longitudinal placement.

A 2.0 L turbocharged direct-injected member of the AR family, fitted with VVT-iW it is able to operate in both the Otto and a modified Atkinson cycle. Debuted in the Lexus NX200t. Power output in the 2015 NX200t is 175 kW (235 hp) at 4,800 - 5,600 rpm and 350 N⋅m (258 lb⋅ft) at 1,650 - 4000 rpm. The 8AR-FTS engine has Lexus’ ESTEC D-4ST (Economy with Superior Thermal Efficient Combustion Direct injection 4-stroke with Turbo) fuel injection. With separate twin injectors for both direct and port injection, ESTEC D-4ST could perform high-pressure direct injection into the cylinder and conventional intake port injection, or direct cylinder injection only, according to engine speed. Power output in some applications, e.g. Lexus IS 200t XE30, Lexus GS 200t and Lexus RC 200t is bumped up by 5 kW (6.7 hp) up to 180 kW (242 hp) in the same rev range but torque remains the same.

=== Applications ===
- Transversal:
  - Toyota Highlander (XU50, China)
  - Toyota Harrier Turbo (XU60, Japan, 2017–2020) ASU60
  - Lexus NX 200t (renamed NX 300) AGZ10/15
  - Lexus RX 200t (renamed RX 300) AGL20/25
- Longitudinal:
  - Toyota Crown ARS210/ARS220
  - Lexus IS 200t (renamed IS 300) ASE30
  - Lexus GS 200t (renamed GS 300) ARL10
  - Lexus RC 200t (renamed RC 300) ASC10
  - Tatuus FT-60 (uprated to 198 kW; 266 hp) race car for Formula Regional Oceania

== Production ==
In Japan built by Toyota Motor Corporation in Kamigo Plant and by Toyota Industries Corporation. Toyota Motor Manufacturing Alabama, Inc. (TMMAL) started building the AR 2.5L and 2.7L engines beginning in mid-2011.

GAC Toyota Engine Co., Ltd Guangqi, China, announced start of AR 2.5L and 2.7L engine production November 2011

Toyota Australia officially opened its new engine plant producing both petrol and hybrid engine variants in Melbourne.

== See also ==
- List of Toyota engines
- List of Toyota transmissions
