= VVT-i =

Automobile variable valve timing technology

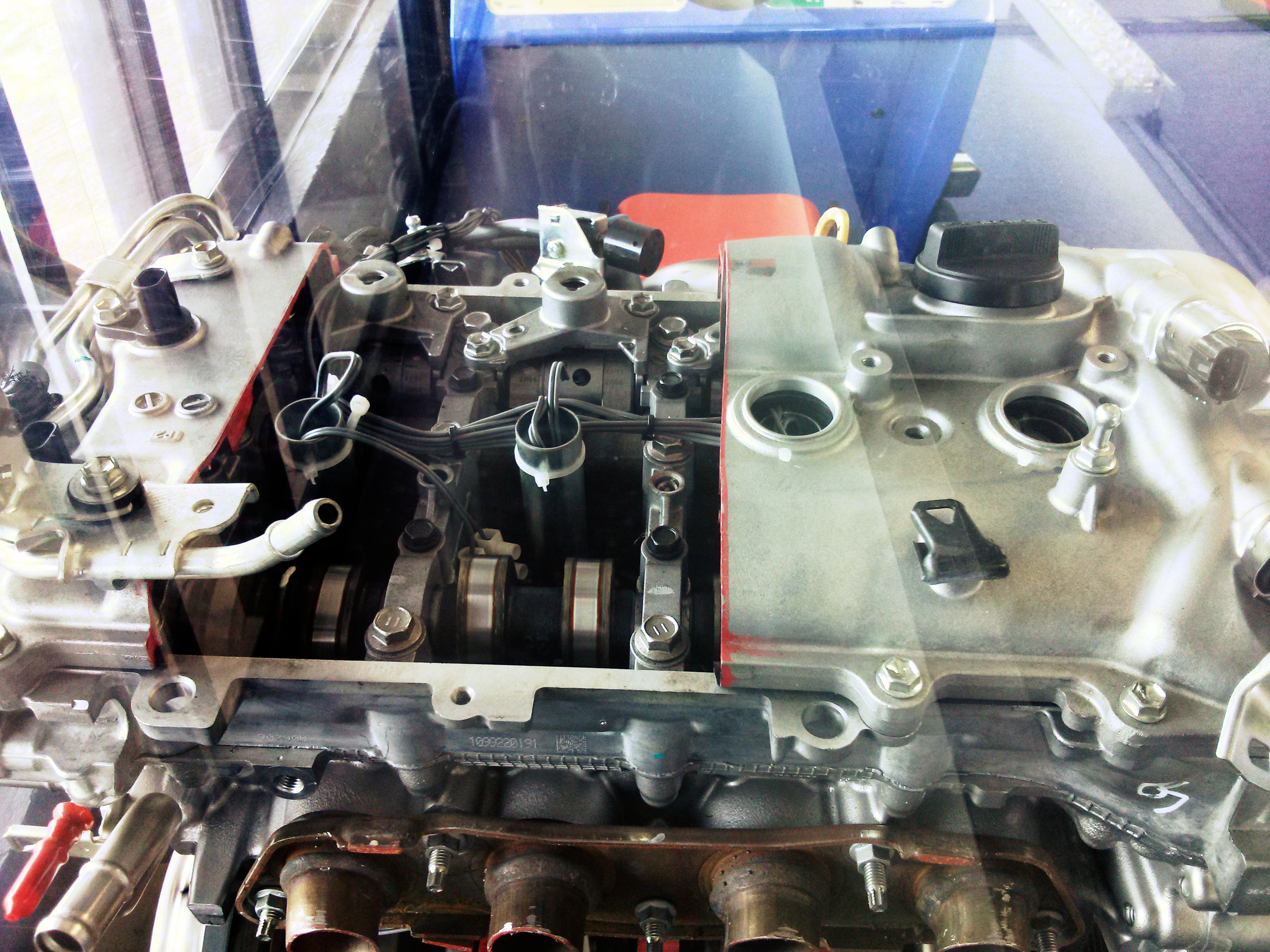
Cutaway view of Variable Valve Timing with intelligence on a ZR engine in Techniquest Glyndŵr

VVT-i, or Variable Valve Timing with intelligence, is an automobile variable valve timing petrol engine technology manufactured by Toyota Group and used by brands such as Groupe PSA (Peugeot and Citroen), Toyota, Lexus, Scion, Daihatsu, Subaru, Aston Martin, Pontiac and Lotus Cars.

Introduced in 1995 with the 2JZ-GE engine found in the JZS155 Toyota Crown and Crown Majesta, VVT-i varies the timing of the intake valves by adjusting the relationship between the camshaft drive (belt or chain) and intake camshaft. Engine oil pressure is applied to an actuator to adjust the camshaft position. Adjustments in the overlap time between the exhaust valve closing and intake valve opening result in improved engine efficiency.

VVT-i replaces the previous VVT system introduced in 1991 with the five-valve per cylinder 4A-GE "Silver Top" engine found in the AE101 Corolla Levin and Sprinter Trueno, which was a 2-stage hydraulically controlled cam phasing system.

Variants of the system, including VVTL-i, Dual VVT-i, VVT-iE, VVT-iW and Valvematic have followed. Direct injection systems such as the D-4 (VVT-i D-4) and D-4S are also used in conjunction with VVT-i.

== VVTL-i ==
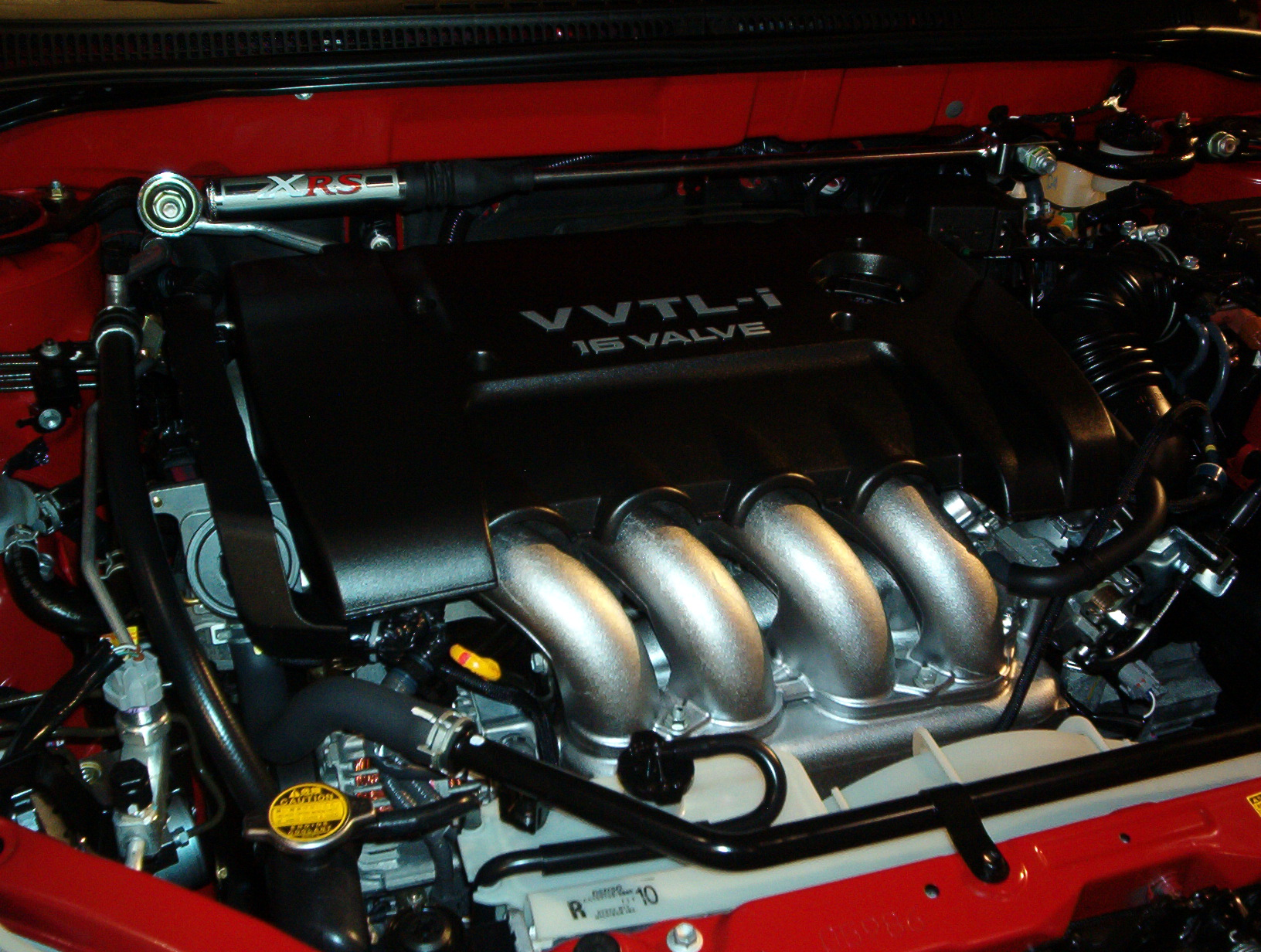
The 2ZZ-GE engine, the first and only engine to feature VVTL-i

VVTL-i (Variable Valve Timing and Lift intelligent system) (also sometimes denoted as VVT-iL or Variable Valve Timing and Intelligence with Lift) is an enhanced version of VVT-i that can alter valve lift (and duration) as well as valve timing. It was introduced with the 16-valve 2ZZ-GE engine found in the 1999 Toyota Celica. The engine head resembles a typical DOHC design, featuring separate cams for intake and exhaust with two intake and two exhaust valves (four total) per cylinder, but unlike a conventional design, each camshaft has two lobes per cylinder, one optimized for lower rpm operation and one optimized for high rpm operation, with higher lift and longer duration. Each valve pair is controlled by one rocker arm, which is operated by the camshaft. Each rocker arm has a slipper follower mounted to the rocker arm with a spring, allowing the slipper-follower to freely move up and down with the high lobe without affecting the rocker arm. When the engine is operating below 6,000–7,000 rpm (dependent on year, car, and ECU installed), the lower lobe is operating the rocker arm and thus the valves, and the slipper-follower is freewheeling next to the rocker arm. When the engine is operating above the lift engagement point, the ECU activates an oil pressure switch which pushes a sliding pin under the slipper-follower on each rocker arm. The rocker arm is now locked into the slipper-follower's movements and thus follows the movement of the high rpm cam lobe and will operate with the high rpm cam profile until the pin is disengaged by the ECU. The lift system is similar in principle to Honda's VTEC operation. Toyota has since ceased production of its VVTL-i engines in most markets because it does not meet Euro IV specifications for emissions regulations. This includes the Corolla T-Sport (Europe), Corolla Sportivo (Australia), Celica, Corolla XRS, Matrix XRS, and the Pontiac Vibe GT, all of which had the 2ZZ-GE engine fitted. On the other hand, the Lotus Elise and Exige continued to offer the 2ZZ-GE engine until 2011, with the Exige also offering the engine with a supercharger.

== Dual VVT-i ==
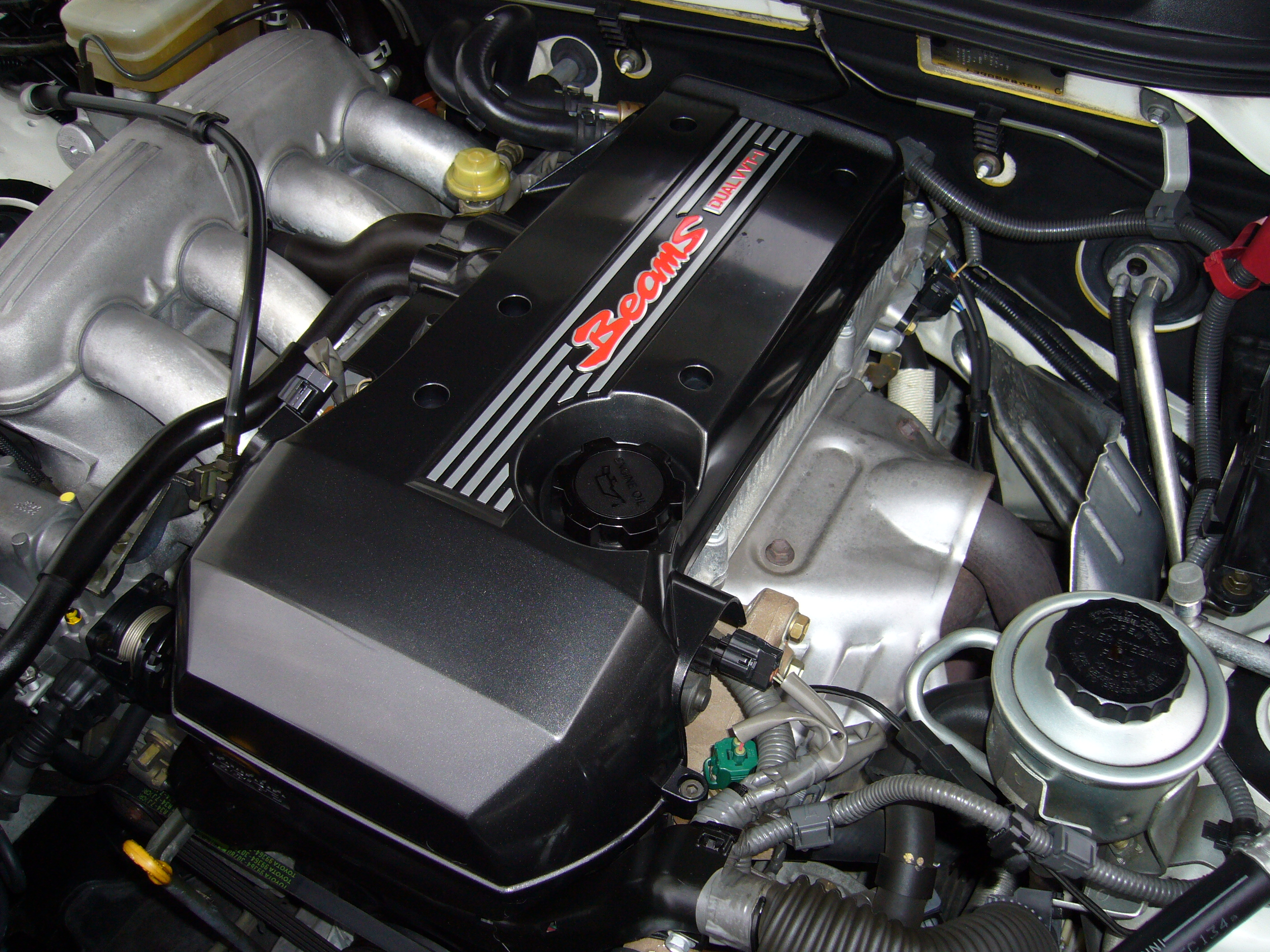
The BEAMS 3S-GE 5th-generation engine ("Black Top"), the first to feature Dual VVT-i

The Dual VVT-i system adjusts timing on both the intake and exhaust camshafts. It was introduced with the Altezza RS200's 3S-GE engine in 1998. Dual VVT-i was later used in Toyota's 3.5-litre 2GR-FE V6 engine, first appearing on the 2005 Avalon. This engine can be found on numerous Toyota and Lexus models. By adjusting the valve timing, engine start and stop occurs almost unnoticeably at minimum compression. Fast heating of the catalytic converter to its light-off temperature is possible, thereby reducing hydrocarbon emissions considerably. Most Toyota engines including the 1LR-GUE (V10, used in the Lexus LFA), UR engines (V8), GR engines (V6), AR engines (large I4), ZR engines (medium I4), and NR engines (small I4) use this technology.

== VVT-iE ==
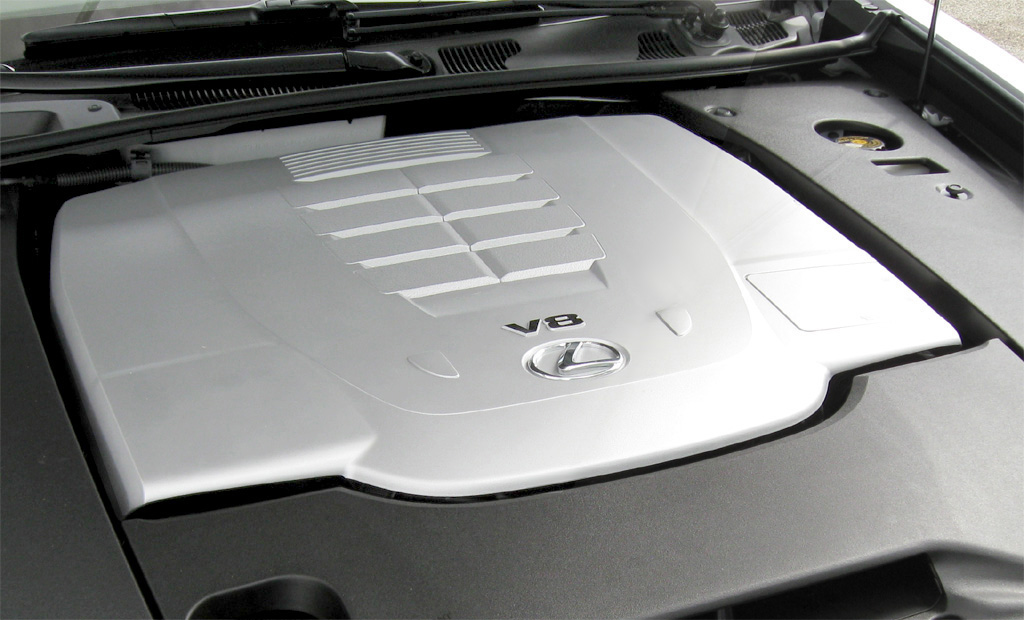
The 1UR-FSE engine, the first to feature VVT-iE

VVT-iE (Variable Valve Timing - intelligent by Electric motor) is a version of Dual VVT-i that uses an electrically operated actuator to adjust and maintain intake camshaft timing. The exhaust camshaft timing is still controlled using a hydraulic actuator. This form of variable valve timing technology was developed initially for Lexus vehicles. This system was introduced on the 1UR-FSE engine in the 2007 Lexus LS 460. The electric motor in the actuator spins in unison with the intake camshaft as the engine operates. To maintain camshaft timing, the actuator motor runs at the same speed as the camshaft. To advance the camshaft timing, the actuator motor rotates slightly faster than the camshaft speed. Conversely, to retard the camshaft timing, the actuator motor rotates slightly slower than the camshaft speed. The speed differences between the actuator motor and the camshaft is used to operate a mechanism that varies the camshaft timing. The advantage of electric actuation lies in its enhanced response and accuracy at low engine speeds and lower temperatures, as well as a greater total range of adjustment. The combination of these factors enables more precise control, resulting in improvements in fuel economy, engine output, and emissions performance.

== VVT-iW ==
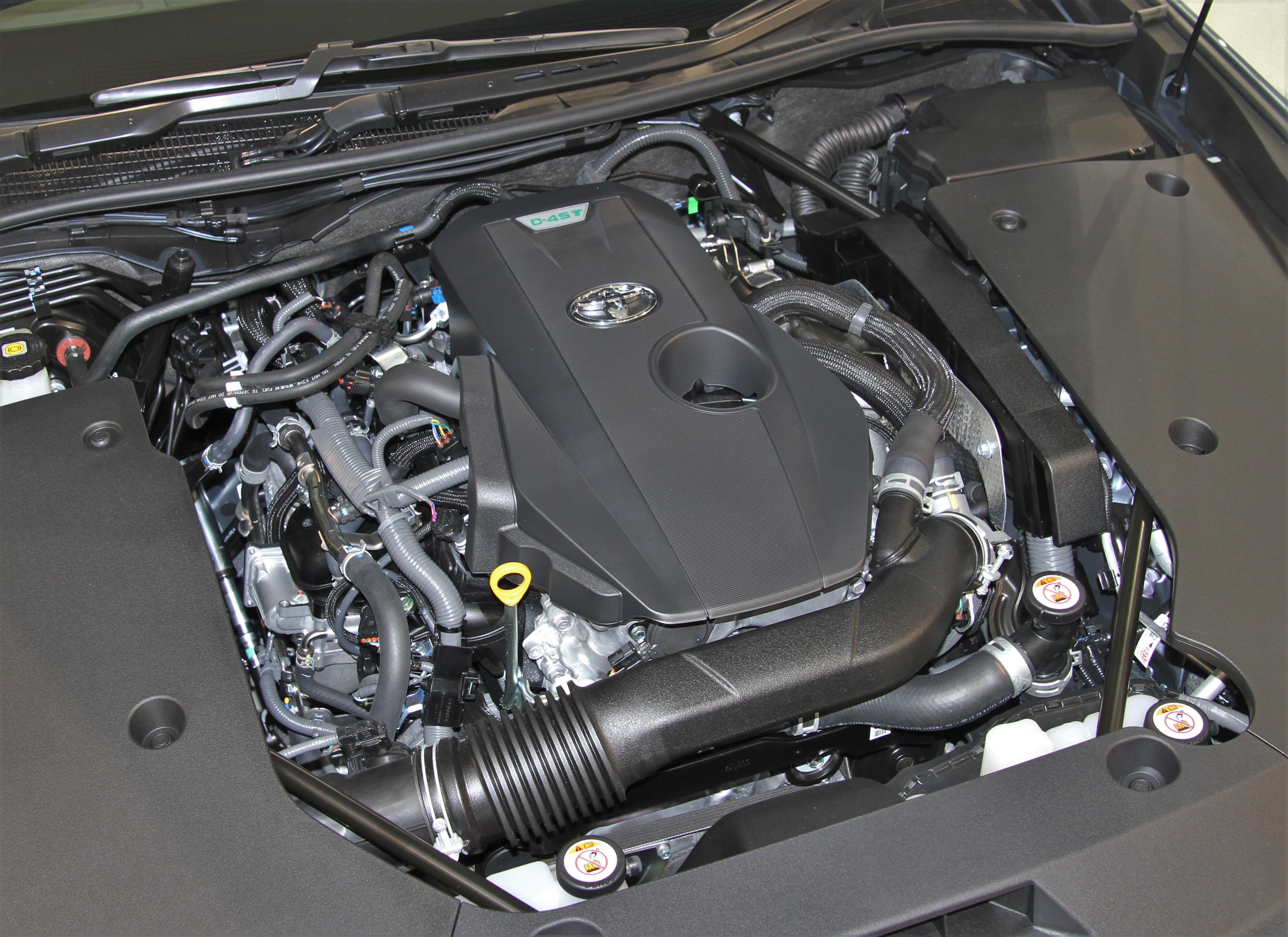
The 8AR-FTS engine, the first to feature VVT-iW

VVT-iW (Variable Valve Timing - intelligent Wide) was introduced with the 2.0L turbocharged direct-injected 8AR-FTS fitted to the Lexus NX 200t. VVT-iW uses VVT-iW on the intake valves and VVT-i on the exhaust valves. The intake cam has mid-position cam lock mechanism that retards the continuously variable timing. It offers expanded valve opening angles (Wide) which enables the engine to operate in a modified-Atkinson cycle at low rpm for improved economy and lower emissions and in the Otto cycle at high rpm for better performance, while also delivering high torque throughout the entire rpm band.

== Valvematic ==
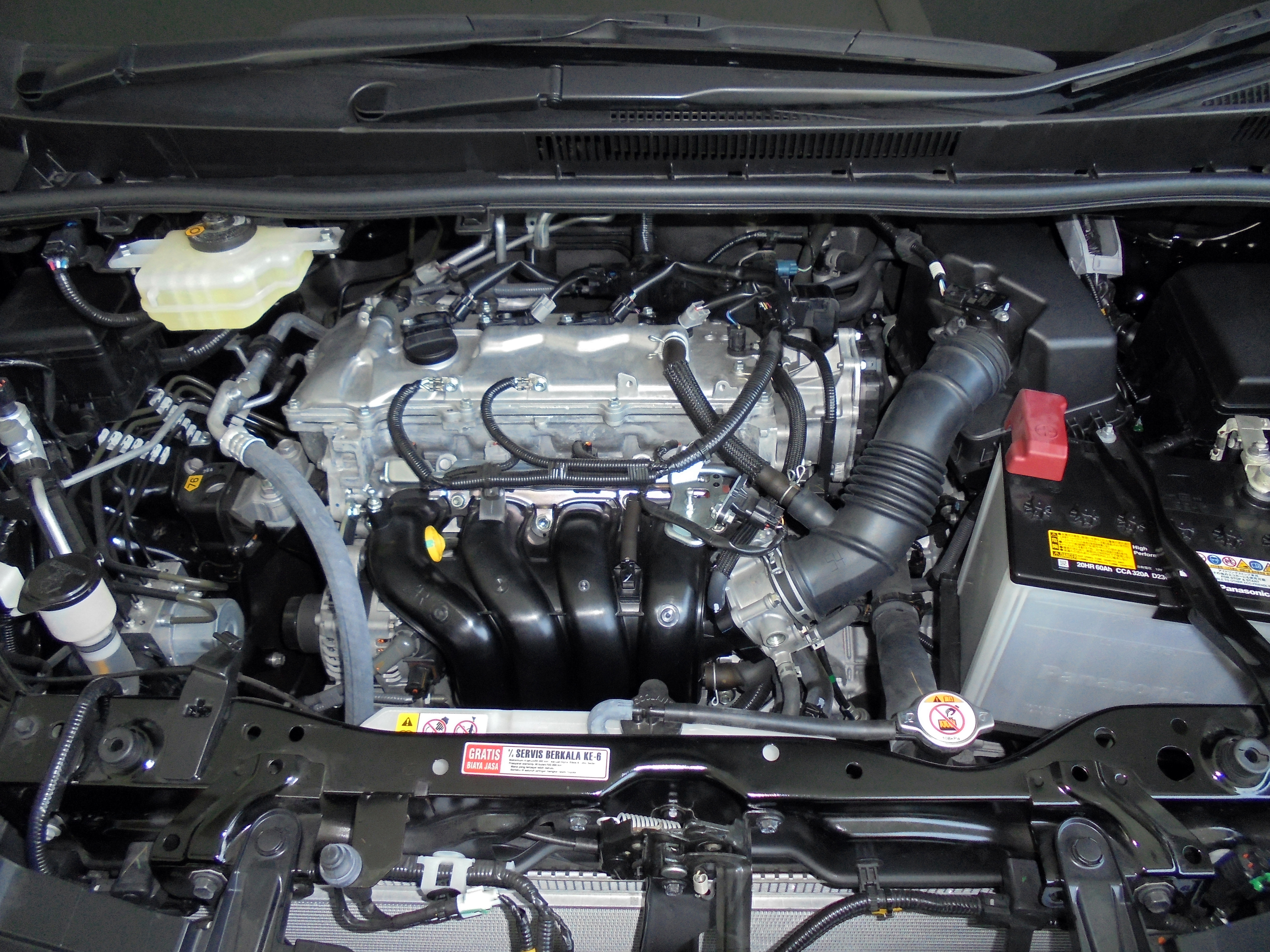
The 3ZR-FAE engine, the first to feature the Valvematic system

The Valvematic system offers continuous adjustment to valve lift and timing and improves fuel efficiency by controlling the fuel/air intake using valve control rather than conventional throttle plate control. The technology made its first appearance in 2007 with the 3ZR-FAE engine in the Noah and later in early-2009 in the Avensis. This system is simpler in design compared to Valvetronic and VVEL, allowing the cylinder head to remain at a similar height.

== Direct injection systems ==
Since 1996, VVT-i has been used in conjunction with Toyota's gasoline direct injection (GDI) systems such as D-4 and D-4S. Toyota engines using direct injection systems are denoted with the "S" suffix in Toyota's engine naming scheme (e.g. 2JZ-FSE, 2GR-FSE and 4U-GSE); this suffix was formerly used to denote engines with swirl intakes (e.g. 3A-SU).

=== D-4 ===
D-4 (Direct Four Line) is a direct injection system used in a number of Toyota engines, sometimes referred to as VVT-i D-4. Developed in 1996, it appeared as early as 2000 on the 1JZ-FSE and 2JZ-FSE engines found in some models of the Toyota Crown and Toyota Crown Majesta, and can also be found in several engines in the Toyota Avensis and Toyota RAV4. The D-4 system uses high-pressure swirl control valves to improve combustion efficiency alongside a three-way catalytic converter. VVT-i is integral to the design of the D-4 system, and is used in conjunction with D-4 to offer ultra-lean fuel consumption with cleaner emissions without compromising performance. Power and torque outputs as well as engine responsiveness are also improved as a result. All D-4 engines use a drive by wire system for the throttle body (also called an electronic throttle control) instead of a mechanical linkage system via a throttle cable.

=== D-4S ===
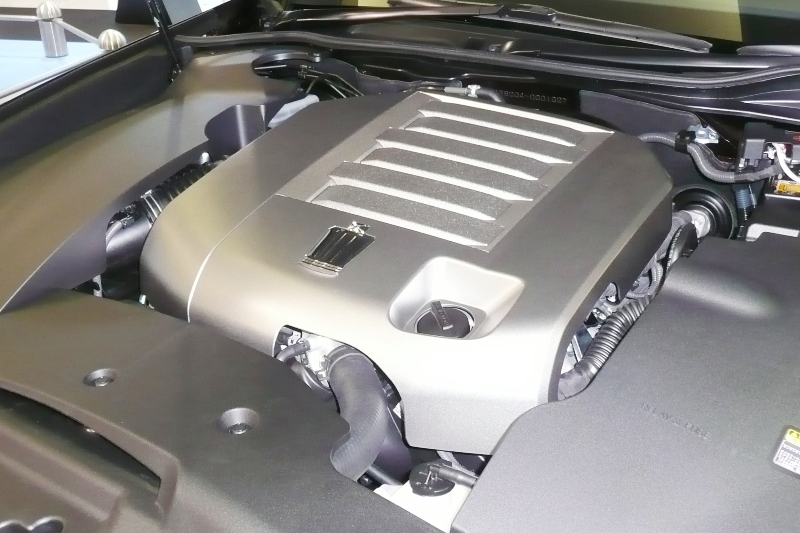
The 2GR-FSE engine, the first to feature D-4S

D-4S (Direct Four Line Superior) is a twin injection fuel system that is an improved version of the previous D-4 system, combining both indirect and direct injection. It uses a traditional manifold fuel injector on one end for low pressure and a direct injector on the other for high pressure. It also works in conjunction with VVT-i (as well as its variants). This system debuted in the 2GR-FSE engine used in the Toyota Crown Athlete and the Lexus IS 350, which was also the first engine overall to combine both traditional fuel injection with direct injection. This system was also used in the 4U-GSE (FA20) engine found in the 2012–2021 Toyota 86 and Subaru BRZ as well as the FA24D engine used in the 2022–present Toyota GR86 and Subaru BRZ, both working in conjunction with Subaru's AVCS system. The D-4S system provides much more cleaner exhaust emissions than with D-4, while also helping with providing more peak power at high rpms.

Despite what some people led to believe, D-4S does not signify a supercharged, direct injection engine (as in "Direct Line Four Supercharged"). For instance, the 4U-GSE and the 2GR-FSE, both using the D-4S system, do not have superchargers. Traditionally, supercharged engines are denoted as "Z" under Toyota's engine naming scheme (e.g. 4A-GZE, 1G-GZE and 2TZ-FZE).

== VVT-i oil supply hose issues ==
In 2010, Toyota USA announced a Limited Service Campaign (LSC 90K) to replace the rubber portion of the oil supply hose for the VVT-i actuator on the 2GR-FE (V6) engine, which were found to be defective. In all, approximately 1.6 million vehicles manufactured prior to 2008 were affected. The defective oil supply hoses were prone to degradation and eventual rupture, causing oil to rapidly leak and resulting in permanent engine damage. In 2014, the LSC 90K Campaign was extended to 31 December 2021 on 117,500 Toyota brand vehicles that were "missed" during the initial campaign.

== See also ==
- List of Toyota engines
- Variable valve timing
- Variable valve lift
- Variable-length intake manifold
- Petrol direct injection
- VTEC
- S-VT
- MIVEC
- Valvetronic
