= Toyota K CVT transmission =

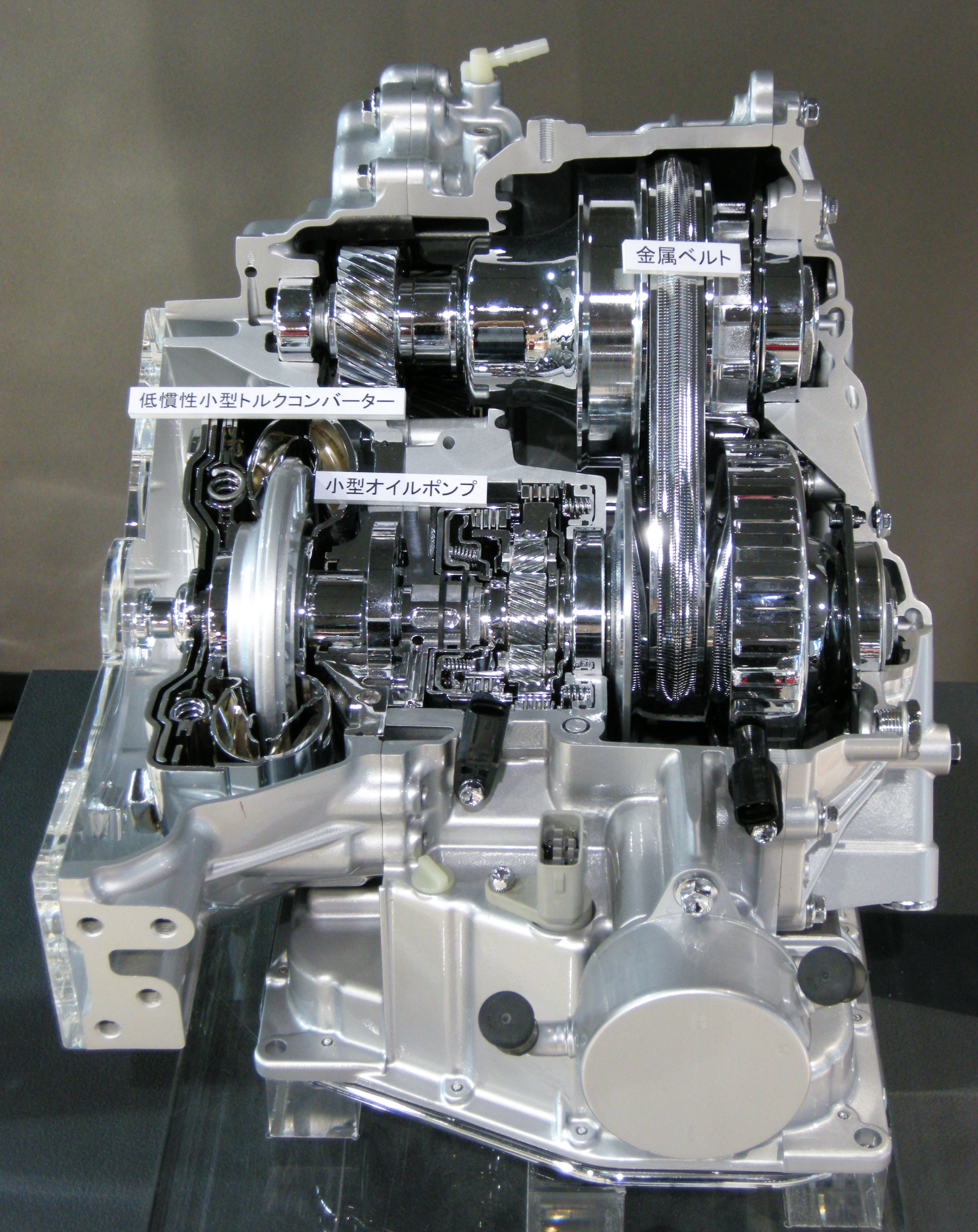

Overview
- Manufacturer: Aisin
- Also called: Super CVT-i
- Production: 2000 - present

The Toyota K CVT transmission is a series of continuously variable transmissions (CVT) found in many Toyota and Lexus automobiles. The transmissions are manufactured for the company by Aisin, an automotive parts manufacturer that is part of the Toyota Group of companies. A CVT is a type of automatic transmission that can change seamlessly through a continuous range of gear ratios. This contrasts with other transmissions that provide a limited number of gear ratios in fixed steps. The K series uses two pulleys connected by a belt.

== K110/K111/K112 series (2000) ==
=== K110 ===
The K110 was Toyota's first belt-type CVT and production began in August 2000. Toyota said that the transmission was both fuel-efficient and offered high driving performance. The K110 features a torque converter with a long-travel damper to help achieve quiet operation and improved fuel efficiency.

Applications:

- Toyota Opa – 2.0L (2000–2005)
- Toyota Allion, Premio, Wish – 2.0L (2001–2011)
- Toyota Voxy – 2.0L (2007–2011)
- Toyota Auris & Corolla Axio / Fielder
- Toyota Ractis & Sienta
- Toyota Vitz

=== K111 ===
The K111 transmission is an improved version of K110 introduced in July 2004. The K111 adds neutral-gear control and acceleration linear control.

Applications:

- Toyota Noah, Voxy – 2.0L (2004–2007)
- Toyota Corolla (E140) – 2.0L (ZRE143, 2010-2014)

=== K112 ===
The K112 transmission, introduced in October 2005, is a modified version of the K111 that is built to work with higher displacement 2.4L engines.

Applications:

- Toyota Alphard – 2.4L (2008–2017)
- Toyota Blade – 2.4L (2006–2011)
- Toyota Estima – 2.4L (2006–2017)
- Toyota Mark X Zio – 2.4L (2007–2011)
- Toyota RAV4 – 2.0/2.4/2.5L (2005–2011)
- Toyota Vanguard – 2.4L (2007–2011)
- Toyota Opa

=== K114 ===
Applications:

- Toyota C-HR/IZOA – 2.0L (2018–present)

== K120 "Direct Shift" transmission (2018) ==
Toyota brands the K120 as the “Direct Shift” CVT and includes a physical first gear (also known as a "launch gear") and nine additional simulated gears, for a total of 10. The launch gear is engaged when the vehicle takes off from being stopped and transitions to the belt drive as the vehicle picks up speed. The benefit of this system is that traditional CVTs tend to have low efficiency in lower gear ratios, creating a moment of sluggishness when starting from a stop. Since the belts in this CVT are handling a narrower band of ratios, belt angles and loads can be reduced, increasing shift speeds and offering a claimed 6% improvement in fuel efficiency. Production began in October 2018.

Gear ratios:

First: 3.377

Second: 2.206

Third: 1.9

Fourth: 1.6

Fifth: 1.3

Sixth: 1

Seventh: 0.8

Eighth: 0.65

Ninth: 0.5

Tenth: 0.447

Applications:

- Toyota Yaris (XP210) and Yaris Cross (XP210, 2020–present)
- Toyota Corolla/Auris/Allion/Levin GT (E210) – 2.0L (2018–present)
- Toyota Camry (XV70) – 2.0L (2019–present)
- Toyota Camry (XV80) – 2.0L (2023–present)
- Toyota Avalon (XX50) – 2.0L (2019–present)
- Toyota Corolla Cross - 2.0L (2021–present)
- Toyota Innova/Kijang Innova Zenix (2022–present)
- Toyota RAV4 (XA50)/Wildlander – 2.0L (2018–present)
- Toyota RAV4 (XA60)/Wildlander – 2.0L (2025–present)
- Toyota Harrier (XU80) - 2.0L (2021–present)
- Lexus ES 200 (2020–present)
- Lexus UX 200 (2018–present)
- Toyota Noah/ Voxy (R90) - 2.0L (2022–present)
- Toyota Sienta (XP210) - 1.5L (2022–present)

== K210 transmission (2002) ==
Achieve both high fuel efficiency and high powertrain performance through size and weight reductions and are perfectly suited for vehicles in the 1.5 to 1.8-litre class. Production began in December 2002. Later in February 2003, Toyota achieved fuel efficiency improvements through its Idling Stop System developed by adding an electronic oil pump to the K210 belt-type CVT, ensuring startup performance and fuel efficiency.

Applications:

- Toyota Vitz
- Toyota Ractis

== K310/K311/K312/K313 series (2006) ==
Achieve both high fuel efficiency and high powertrain performance through size and weight reductions and are suitable for vehicles in the 1.5- to 1.8-liter class. Production began in September 2006.

Current applications:

- Daihatsu Xenia (K312) – 1.3L & 1.5L (2021–present)
- Toyota Avanza (K312) – 1.3L & 1.5L (2021–present)
- Toyota Corolla (K311), Altis – 1.8L (2010–present)
- Toyota Corolla Cross (K311) – 1.8L (2020–present)
- Toyota C-HR (K312) – 1.2L (2017–present)
- Toyota Vios (K312) – 1.5L (2016–present)
- Toyota Yaris Cross (K312) - 1.5L (AC200, 2023-present)
- Toyota Yaris (K312) – 1.5L (2016–present)
- Toyota Sienta (K313) - 1.5L (2015-present)

Previous applications:

- Toyota Auris, Corolla, Rumion – 1.5/1.8L (2006-2011)
- Toyota Allion, Premio – 1.5/1.8L, IST 1.5L (2007-2011)
- Toyota Avensis – 1.8/2.0L (2008-2011)
- Toyota Isis, Verso (K311), Wish – 1.8L (2009-2011)
- Toyota Probox, Succeed – 1.5L (2010-2011)
- Toyota Corolla Axio 1.5L NZE141 (K310)

Toyota Corolla Axio 1.8L ZRE142 (K311)

Low	O/D	Rev
2.386	0.411	2.505

Final drive:

- 5.698:1 (when fitted to 1.5L Allion & Premio 1NZ-FE and 1.8L Corolla 2ZR-FE)
- 5.356:1 (when fitted to 1.8L Allion & Premio 2ZR-FE)

== K410/K411/K41 series (2004) ==
=== K410 ===
Achieves both high fuel efficiency and high powertrain performance through size and weight reductions. Designed for vehicles with engine displacements between 1- and 1.3-liters. Production began December 2004.

Applications:

- Toyota Belta
- Toyota Vitz
- Several other models

Low	O/D	Rev
2.4	0.43	2.505

Final drive:

- 5.833:1 (when fitted to 1L 1KR-FE)
- 5.08:1 (when fitted to 1.3L 1NR-FE)

=== K41A ===
A version of the K410 transmission with the differential shifted forward to maximize space the Toyota iQ, a compact city car that was engineered to maximize passenger space, while minimizing exterior length. Production began October 2008.

Applications:

- Toyota iQ

=== K41B ===
Created by increasing the capacity of the K41A CVT, for 1.3-liter engines. Production began April 2009.

Applications:

- Toyota iQ

=== K411 ===
Based on the K410 and adopting a flex-start control mechanism for the first time in a Toyota CVT; Lock-up clutch actively activated during startup to run the engine in the most efficient operating region, thereby improving fuel efficiency. Production began December 2010.

Applications:

- Several models including Corolla, Auris, Vitz, Vios, Yaris, Corolla Axio and Echo

== See also ==
- Toyota Drivetrain technical development
