= Toyota Camry (XV80) =

Ninth generation of Toyota Camry

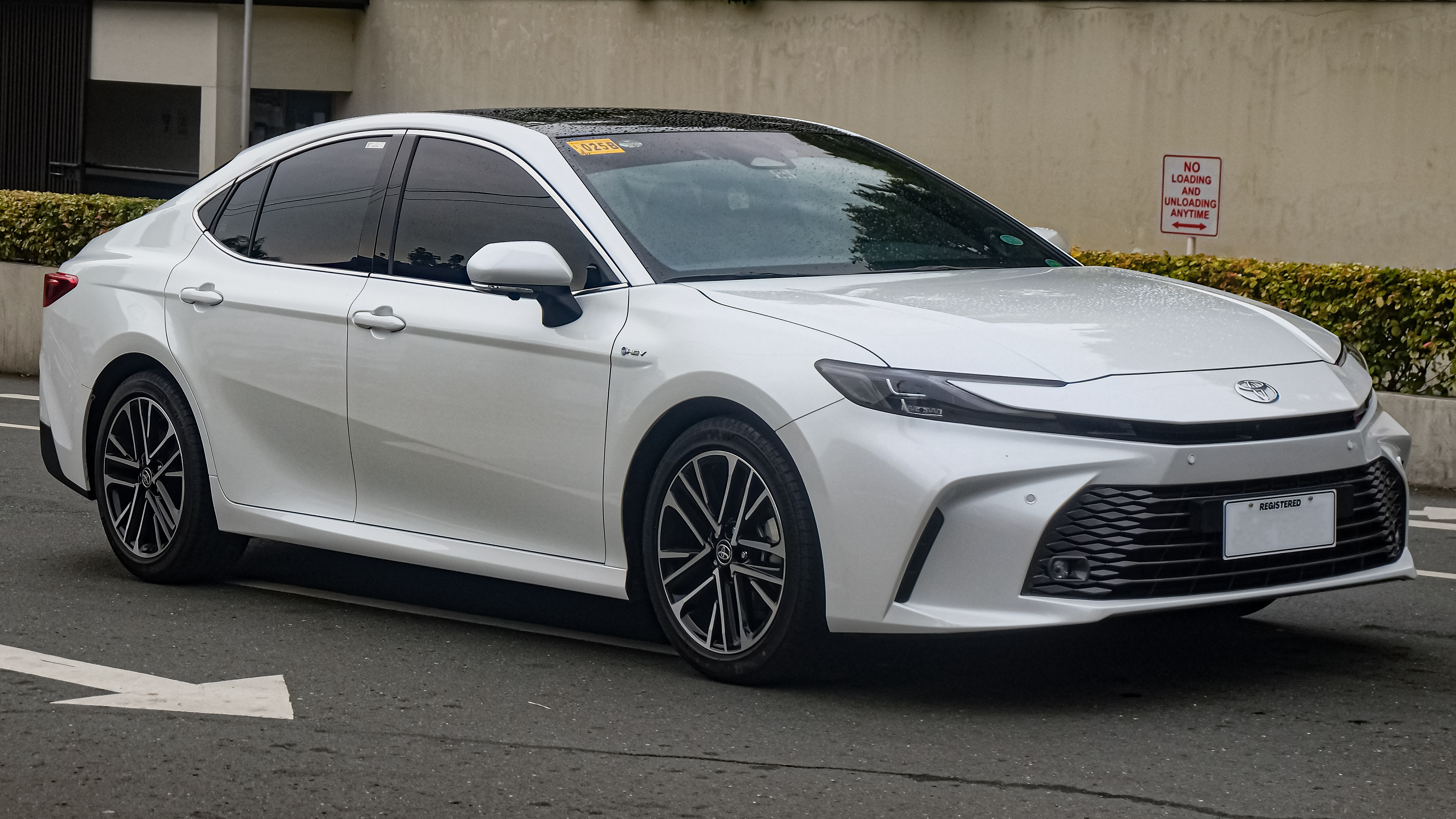
- 2025 Toyota Camry 2.5 HEV (AXVH80, Philippines)

Overview
- Manufacturer: Toyota
- Model code: XV80
- Production: October 2023 – present (China); April 2024 – present (US); October 2024 – present (Thailand); December 2024 – present (India)
- Model years: 2025 – present
- Assembly: Japan: Toyota, Aichi (Tsutsumi plant, export only); China: Nansha, Guangzhou (GAC Toyota); India: Bidadi (TKML); Thailand: Chachoengsao (TMT); United States: Georgetown, Kentucky (TMMK)
- Designer: Adam Rabinowitz

Body and chassis
- Class: Mid-size car
- Body style: 4-door sedan
- Layout: Front-engine, front-wheel-drive; Front-engine, four-wheel-drive
- Platform: TNGA: GA-K
- Related: Toyota RAV4 (XA60); Toyota Highlander (BEV); Lexus ES (XZ20)

Powertrain
- Engine: Gasoline: 2.0 L M20A-FKS I4 (MXVA80); 2.0 L M20C-FKS I4 (China, MXVA80); 2.5 L A25A-FKS I4 (AXVA80); Gasoline hybrid: 2.0 L M20F-FXS I4 (China, MXVH80); 2.5 L A25A-FXS I4 (AXVH80); 2.5 L A25D-FXS I4 (China, AXVH80)
- Power output: 127 kW (170 hp; 173 PS); 145 kW (194 hp; 197 PS); 168 kW (225 hp; 228 PS) (A25A-FXS; front-wheel drive models); 173 kW (232 hp; 235 PS) (A25A-FXS; all-wheel drive models)
- Transmission: 8-speed UB80E automatic (A25A-FKS); K120 CVT with physical first gear (M20A-FKS/M20C-FKS); Aisin Seiki T110 eCVT (hybrid models)
- Hybrid drivetrain: Power-split

Dimensions
- Wheelbase: 2,825 mm (111.2 in)
- Length: 4,885–4,920 mm (192.3–193.7 in)
- Width: 1,840 mm (72.4 in)
- Height: 1,445 mm (56.9 in)
- Curb weight: 1,565–1,655 kg (3,450–3,649 lb)

Chronology
- Predecessor: Toyota Camry (XV70)

The Toyota Camry (XV80) is a mid-size car produced by Toyota since October 2023. Replacing the XV70 series, the XV80 represented the ninth generation of the Toyota Camry in all markets outside Japan, which followed a different generational lineage.

== Overview ==
The XV80 Camry was unveiled on 14 November 2023, it was previewed at the 2023 Los Angeles Auto Show. Unlike the previous generations, the XV80 Camry is not available with a pure gasoline engine for markets like North America and Europe. Pure gasoline models are still available in markets such as China.

The XV80 Camry is underpinned by the same GA-K platform as the XV70, retaining the underlying body structure, front doors and roofline, with some changes such as revised dampers and revised tuning for improved comfort. The front fascia design adopts Toyota's 'hammerhead' grille and slimmer headlights integrates the C-shaped daytime running lights. The rear fascia design features taillights that mimics the C-shaped design from the front, Camry lettering spelt across the boot lid, and a revised crease across the sides of the bumper.

== Markets ==
=== Asia ===
==== Japan ====
While the Camry is still assembled in Japan, the XV80 is the first generation to be built exclusively for export due to declining sales of the previous generations on their home market. In 2022, Japan represented only 1% of total Camry sales, leading the company to end sales there at the end of 2023. The XV80 Camry was reintroduced in the Japanese market in 2026, though instead of being produced domestically, it will be imported from the United States.

==== India ====
The XV80 Camry was launched in India on 11 December 2024 with a 2.5 liter hybrid engine. It is available in two grades: Elegance and Sprint, the former grade has luxurious features and the latter grade has sporty features such as black-colored roof, matte black alloy wheels, body kits and spoilers.

==== China ====
For the Chinese market, the XV80 Camry was unveiled at the November 2023 Guangzhou Auto Show, with different designs for the front headlights, front bumper for the regular model, dashboard design, and internal center console compared to the international models. In addition to offering a 2.5-liter hybrid engine in the local market, this model offers a 2.0-liter pure gasoline engine and two types of hybrid powertrains.

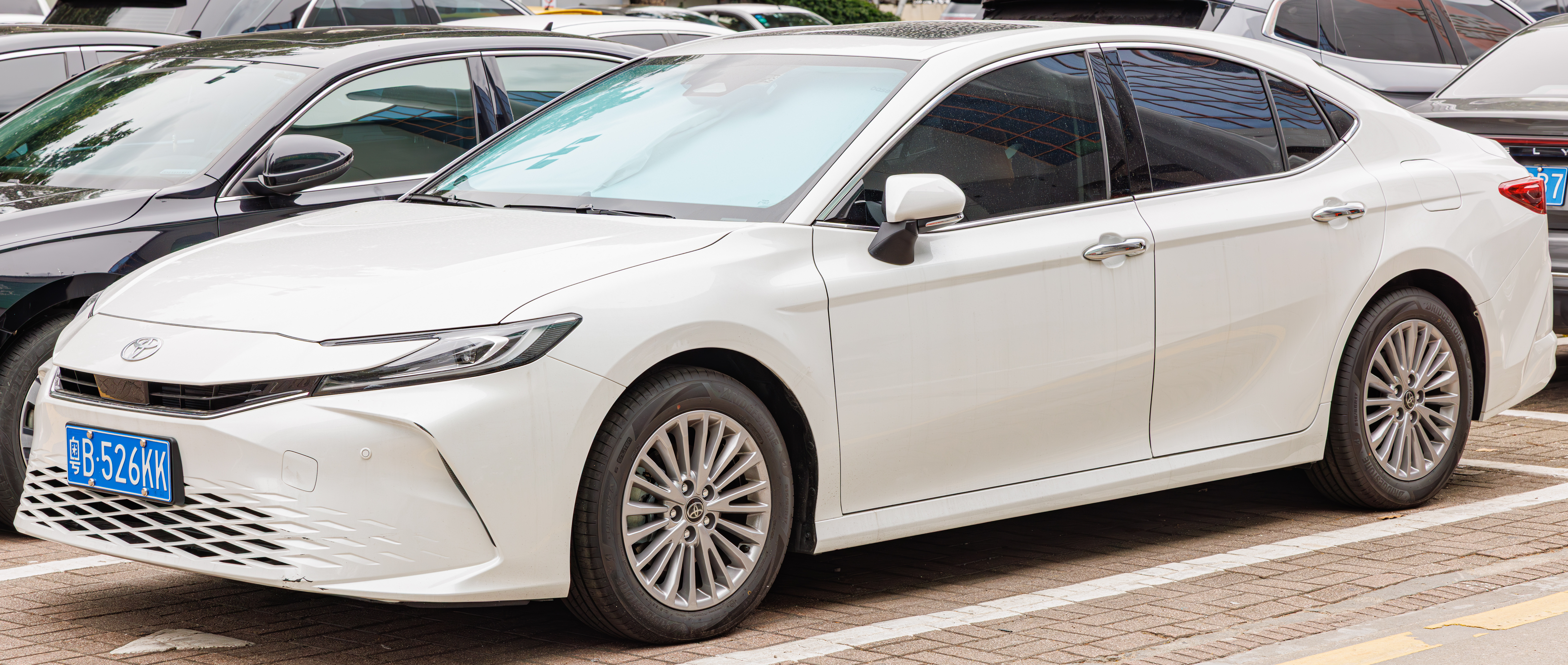
Toyota Camry 2.0G LE (MXVA80; China)

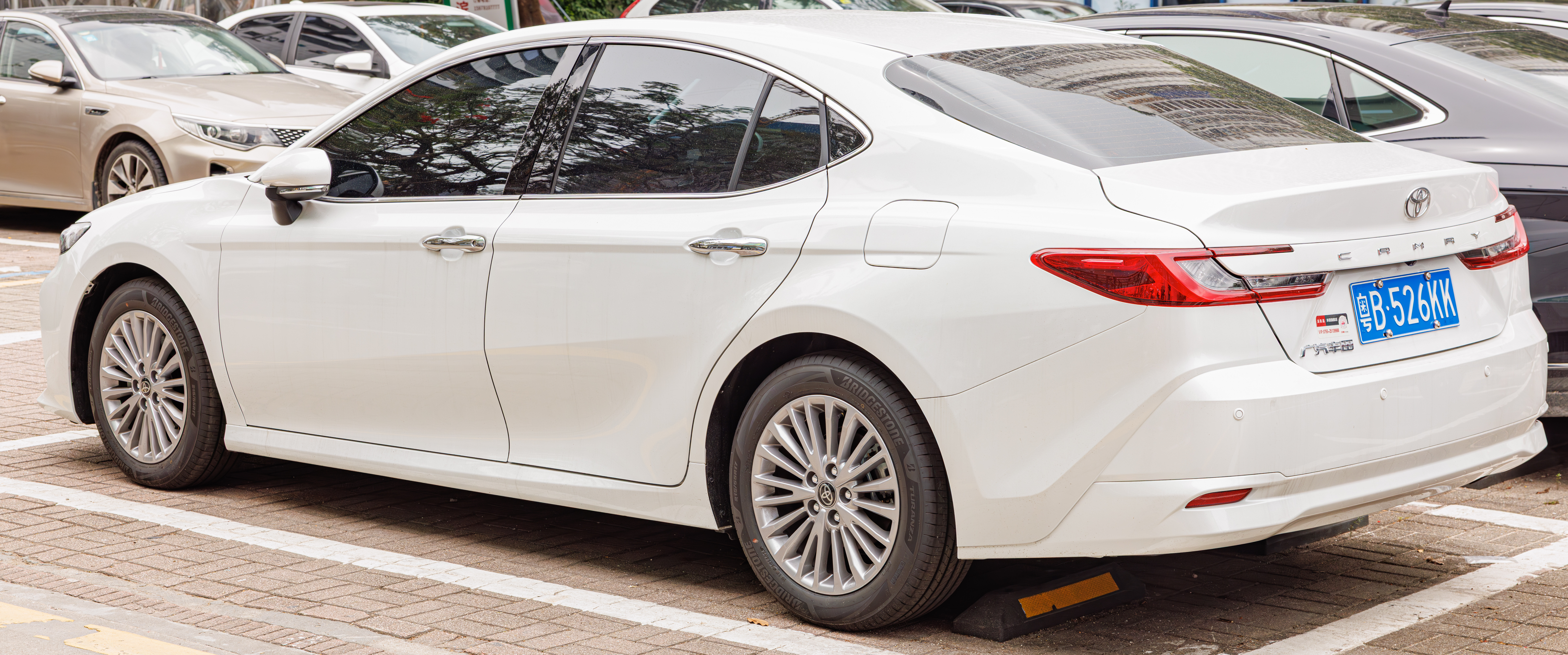
Toyota Camry 2.0G LE Rear view (MXVA80; China)

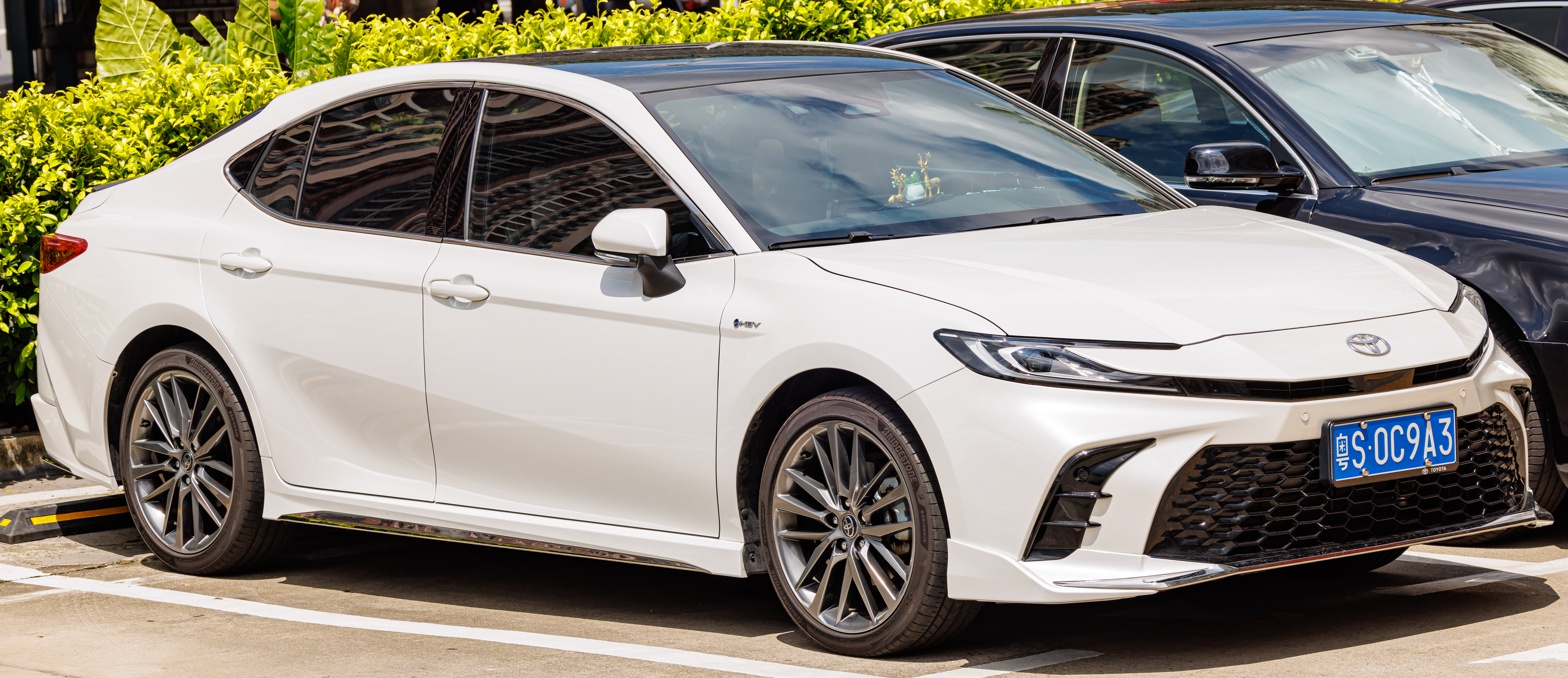
Toyota Camry 2.0H SE (MXVH80; China)

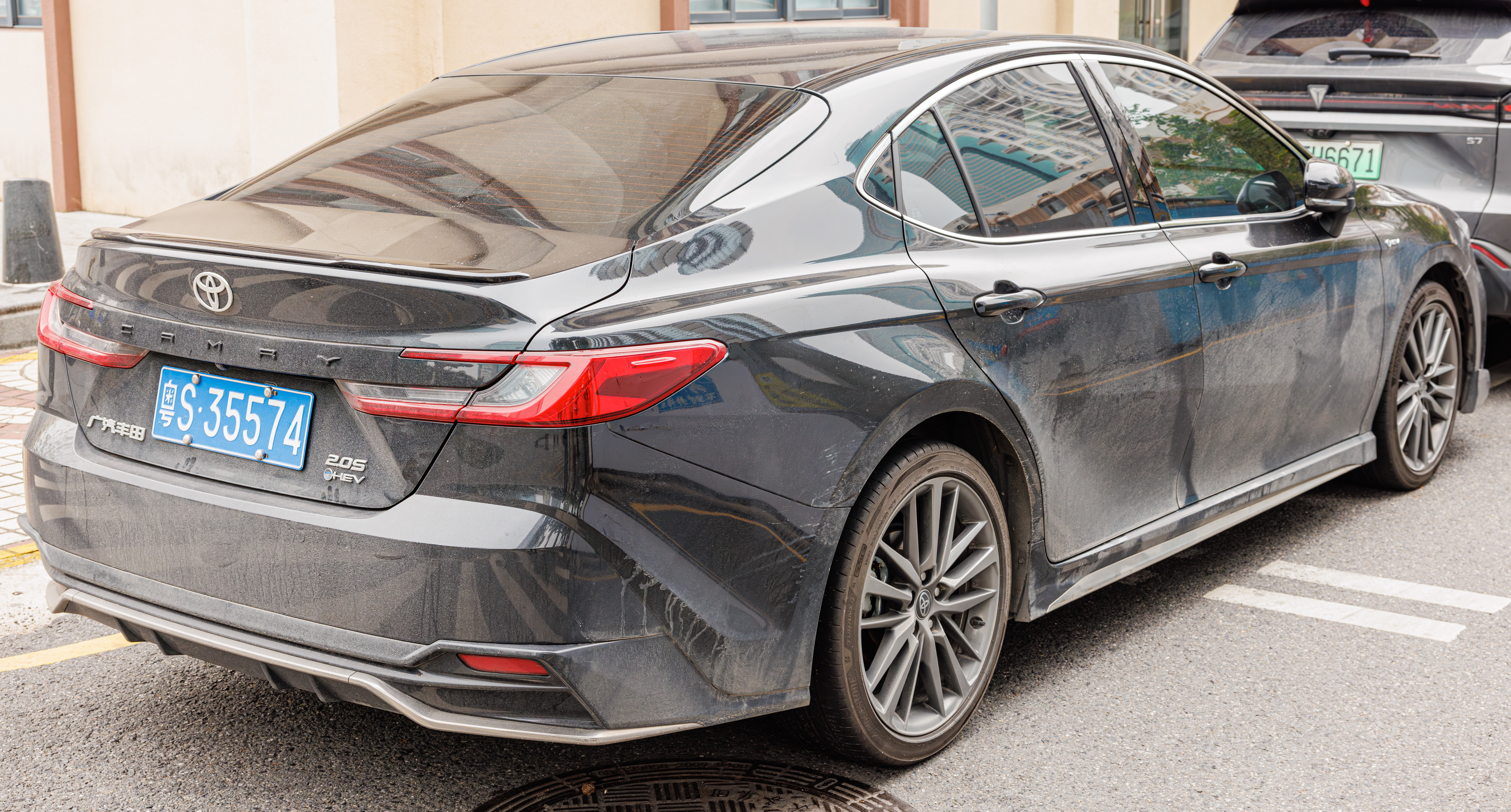
Toyota Camry 2.0H SE Rear view (MXVH80; China)

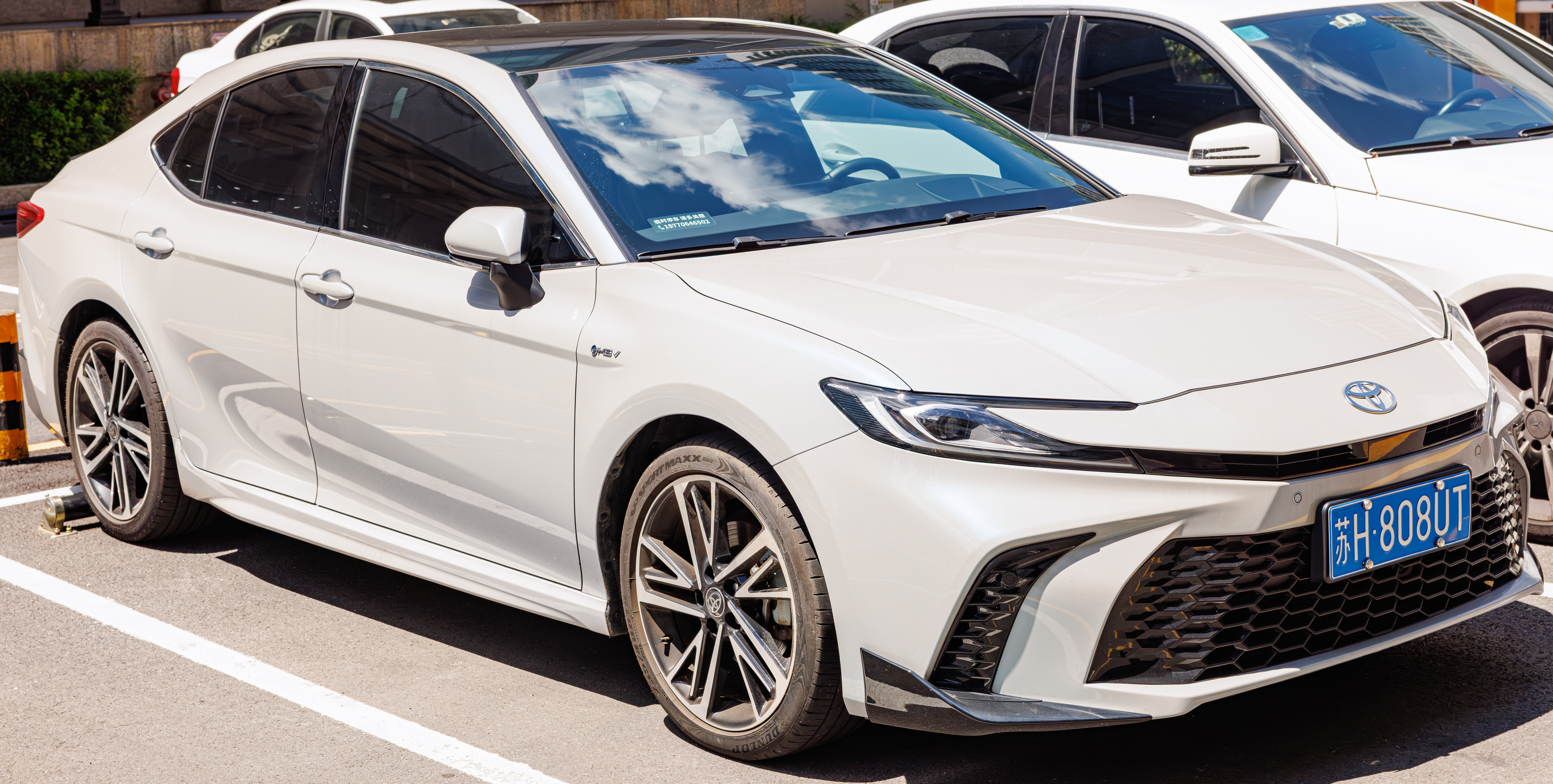
Toyota Camry 2.0H XSE (MXVH80; China)

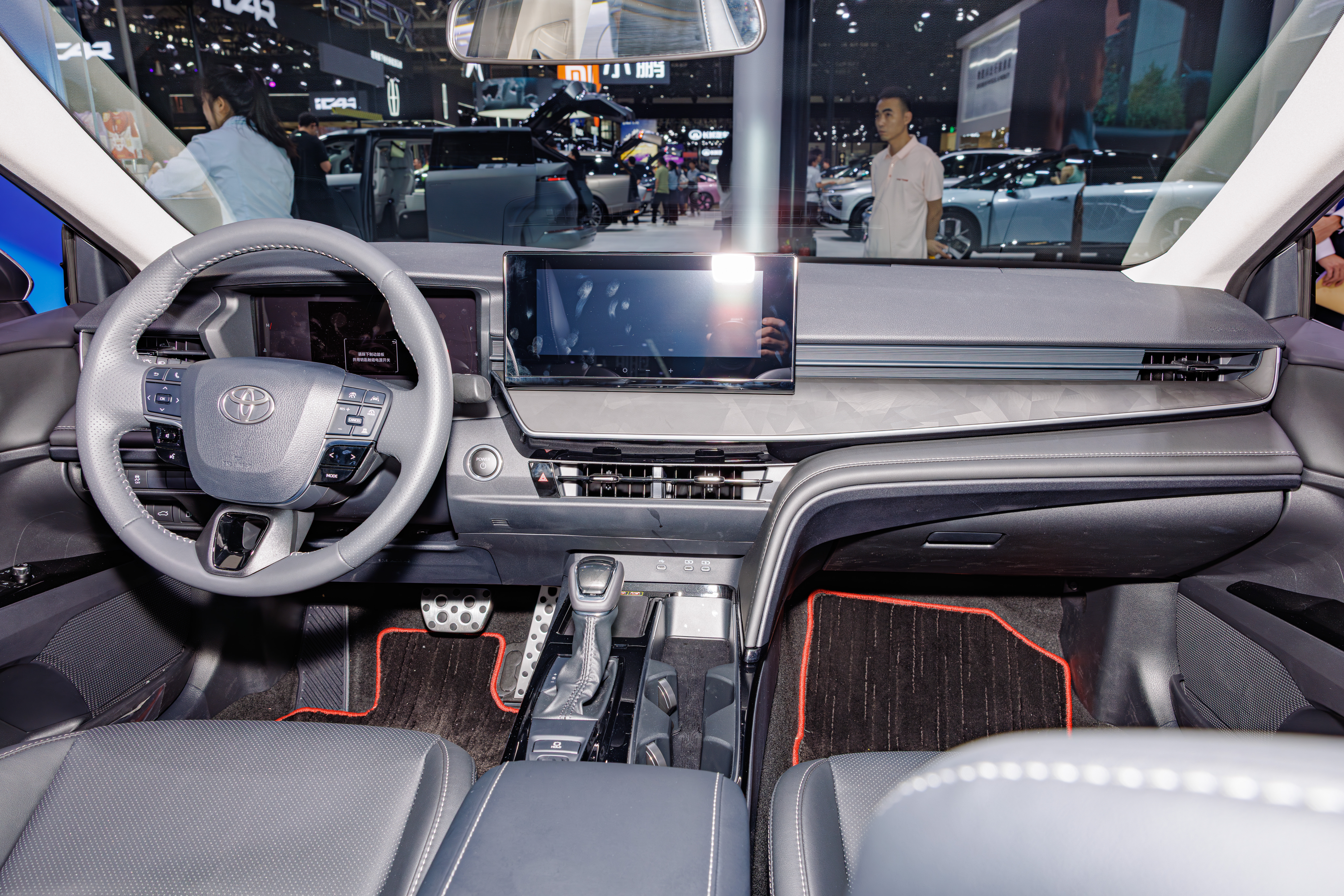
Interior (MXVH80; China)

==== South Korea ====
The South Korean market Camry went on sale on 26 November 2024. Sourced from Japan, it is available with two grades with the A25A-FXS engine as standard: XLE and XLE Premium, with Korean trim levels being akin to the North American trim levels.

==== Taiwan ====
For the Taiwanese market, the Camry was unveiled on 4 July 2024. It is offered in two engines: a 2.0-liter pure gasoline engine and a 2.5-liter hybrid engine, offering in three grades: Luxury, Premium and Flagship.

=== Europe ===
The XV80 Camry made its European debut in June 2024, first launching the Czech market. The design is based on North America's XLE model and will feature the fifth generation hybrid powertrain along with 2.5 L engine, modernized infotainment, improved suspension and upgraded Toyota Teammate and Toyota Safety Sense safety packages. In contrast with the previous generation, the new model was only confirmed to be sold in selected countries within Toyota Central Europe region (Czechia, Slovakia, Poland, Hungary), Baltic countries and Israel.

=== Middle East ===
The Camry XV80 was introduced to the Gulf region in August 2024, with models being sourced from Japan. Power train options includes a 2.5-liter four cylinder engine in both gasoline-only and hybrid forms. Trims in Saudi Arabia includes E, E+, LE, Grande and Lumiere.

=== North America ===
==== United States ====
The Camry XV80 is available with four grades in the United States: LE, SE, XLE and XSE. In the market, for the first time, all trim levels of the Camry come standard with a hybrid powertrain and optional all-wheel-drive; inline-4 and V6 gasoline-only powertrains are no longer available. Toyota made the Camry all-hybrid, to help keep the nameplate and its internal combustion engine relevant, as they transition to electrification and become carbon neutral.

The touchscreen sizes for the audio multimedia system have been increased. LE and SE grades comes standard with a 8.0-inch touchscreen, while a 12.3-inch touchscreen is available on SE, and standard on XLE and XSE grades. The vehicle is equipped with Toyota's updated audio multimedia system that debuted on the XK70 series Tundra, and the Toyota Safety Sense (TSS) 3.0 suite of advanced driver-assistance systems.

In 2025, for the 2026 model year, the Nightshade Edition grade was added, based on the SE grade.

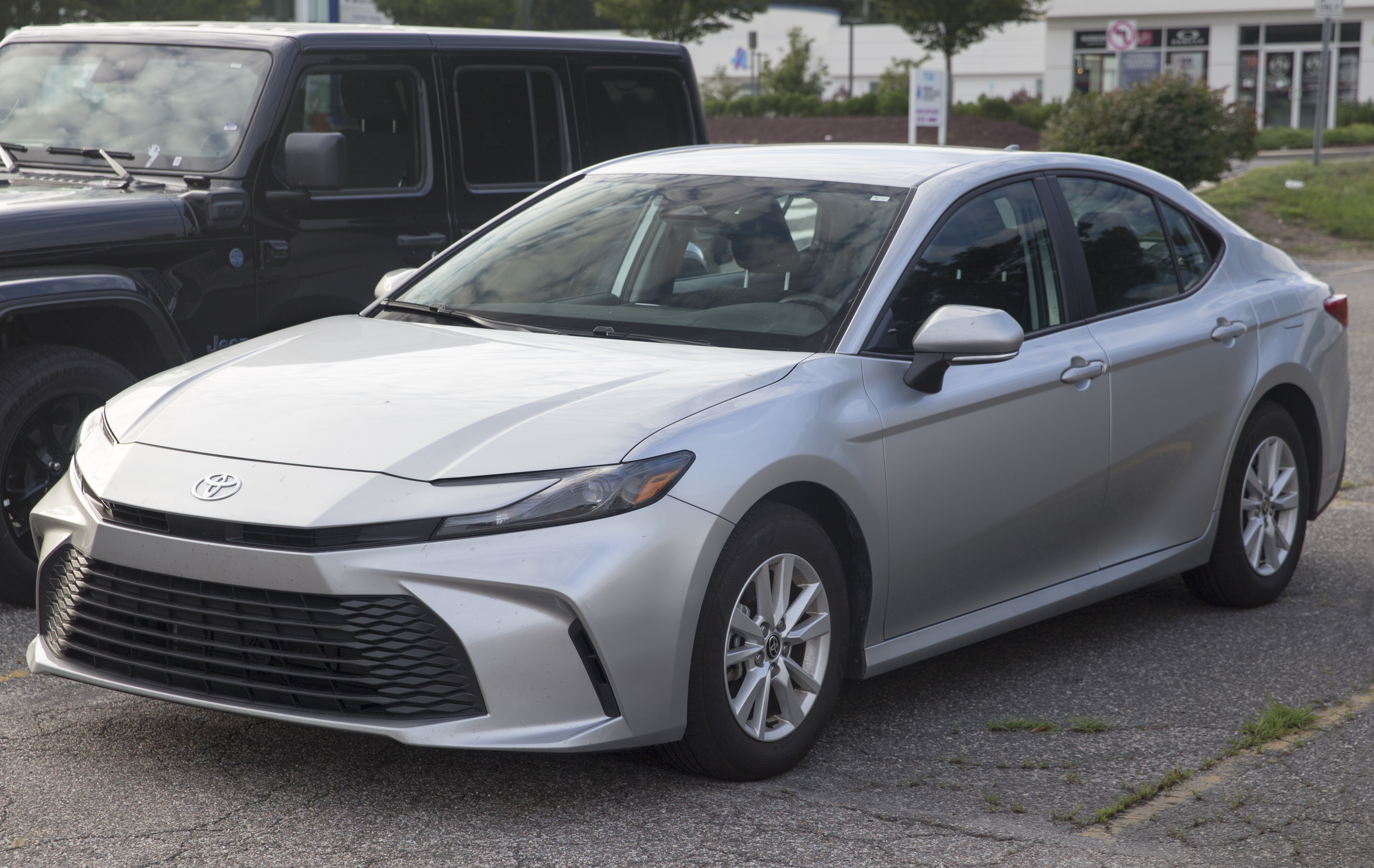
2025 Toyota Camry Hybrid LE (AXVH80)

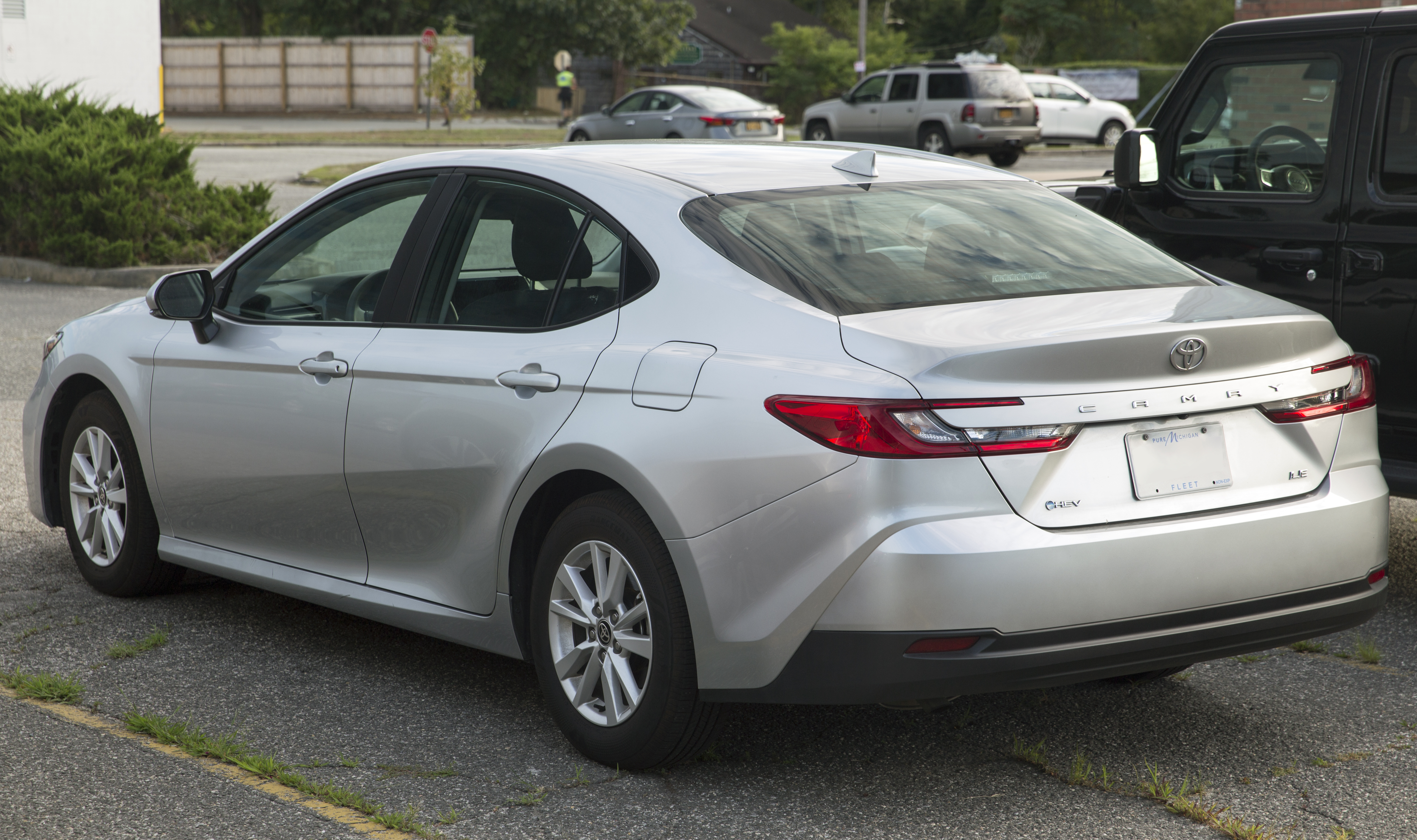
Rear view

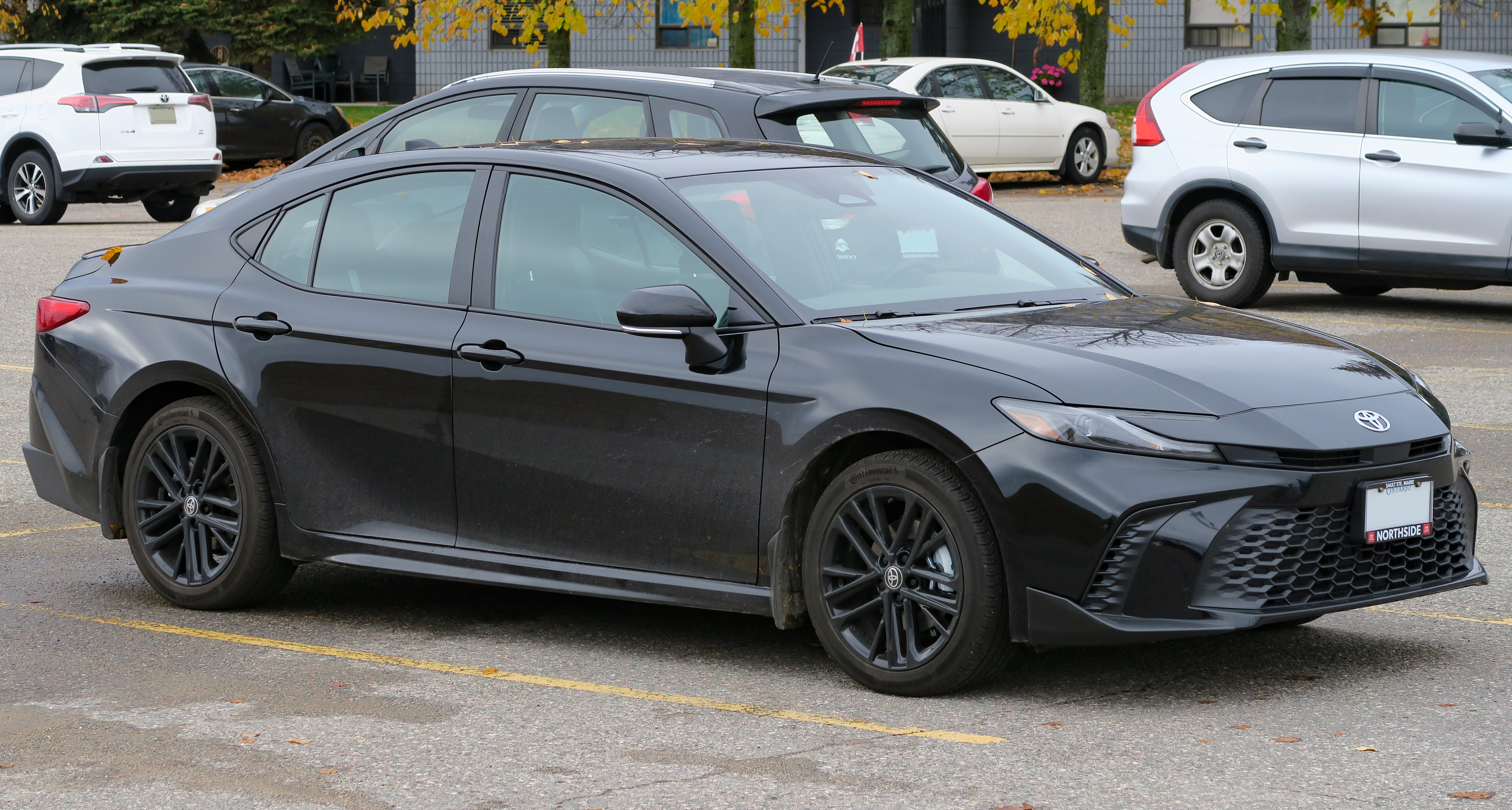
2025 Toyota Camry Hybrid SE (AXVH80)

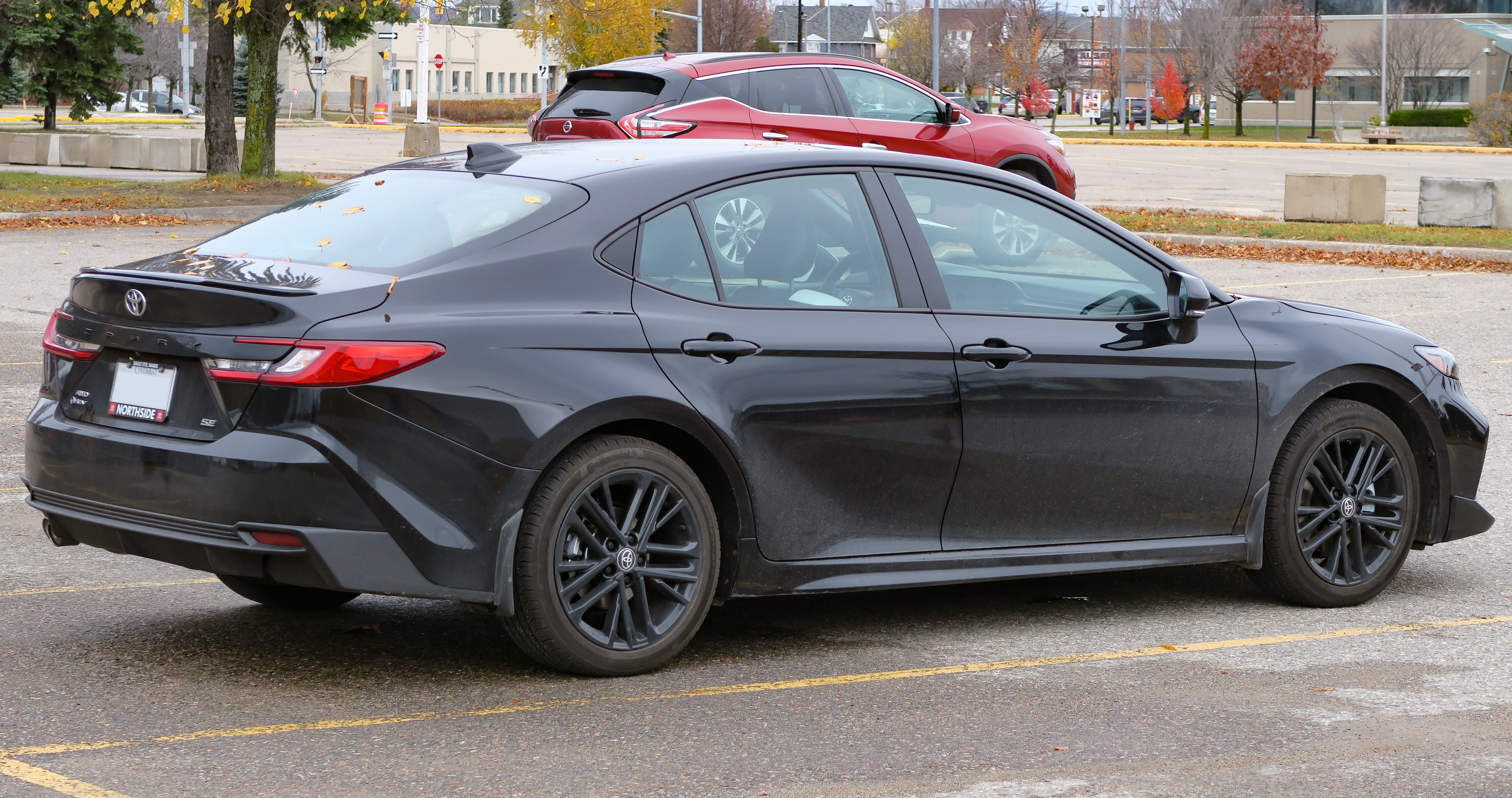
Rear view

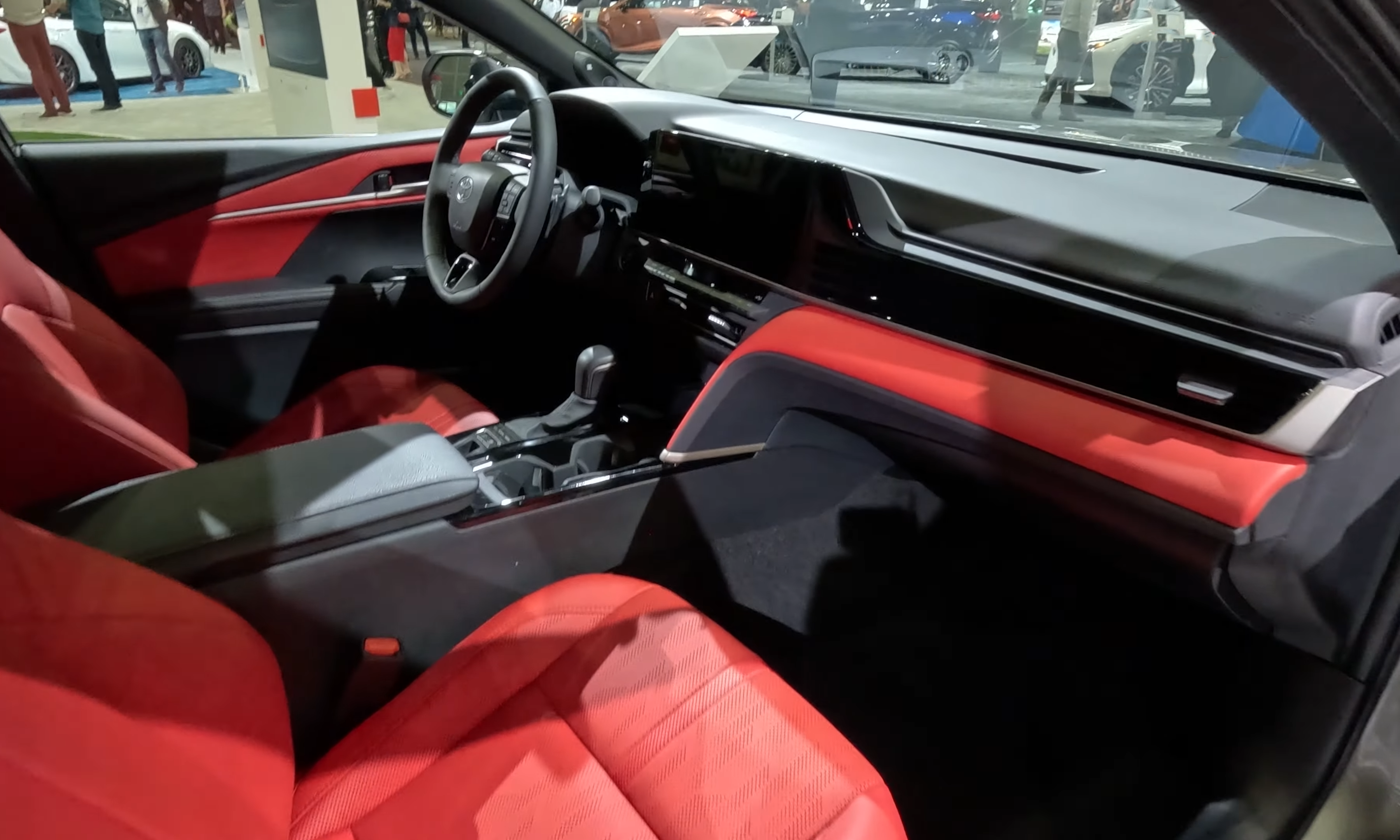
Interior

==== Canada ====
The Camry XV80 debuted in Canada on January 18, 2024 at the Montreal International Auto Show, with sales commencing in late spring 2024.

Sourced from the United States, the model range largely mirrors that of the US market; however, the LE grade is no longer available, having been replaced with a decontented SE grade, with the SE Upgrade being analogous to the US SE grade. Additionally, all-wheel drive is only available as an option on the SE Upgrade, becoming standard equipment on the XSE and XLE grades, and is not offered on the base SE grade.

In 2025, for the 2026 model year, the Nightshade Edition grade was added to the Canadian range, based on the SE Upgrade AWD. Sales commenced in September 2025.

==== Mexico ====
The Camry XV80 was launched in Mexico on 13 June 2024 with three trim levels: LE, XSE and XLE; it is powered by a 2.5-liter gasoline hybrid and sourced from the United States.

=== Oceania ===
==== Australia ====
The Camry XV80 was launched in Australia on 17 September 2024 with three trim levels: Ascent, Ascent Sport and SL; it is powered by a 2.5-liter gasoline hybrid. Australian models are sourced from Japan.

==== New Zealand ====
The Camry XV80 was launched in New Zealand on 1 August 2024 with three trim levels: GX, SX and ZR; it is powered by a 2.5-liter gasoline hybrid.

=== Southeast Asia ===
==== Brunei ====
The XV80 Camry was launched in Brunei on 3 January 2025 along with the facelifted GR Yaris hatchback. Imported from Thailand, the car is offered only as a 2.5-liter gasoline hybrid variant.

==== Indonesia ====
The XV80 Camry was launched in the Indonesian market during the 32nd Indonesia International Motor Show on 13 February 2025. It is available in a sole variant with a 2.5-liter gasoline hybrid, and imported from Thailand like previous models. A variant powered by a 2.5-liter gasoline was added on 7 October 2025.

==== Malaysia ====
The XV80 Camry HEV grade was launched in the Malaysian market during the 2024 Kuala Lumpur International Mobility Show on 4 December 2024, while the non-hybrid V grade was introduced on 23 December 2024. Both grades are powered by 2.5-liter four cylinder engine, and are fully imported from Thailand.

==== Philippines ====
The XV80 Camry was launched in the Philippine market alongside the Tamaraw (Toyota Hilux) utility truck on 6 December 2024. It is only available in one grade: 2.5 HEV variant, and Toyota Safety Sense 3.0 is standard.

==== Singapore ====
The Camry XV80 made its ASEAN debut in Singapore on 29 August 2024 launched by Borneo Motors. It is available as an Elegance variant powered by a 2.5-liter gasoline hybrid powertrain.

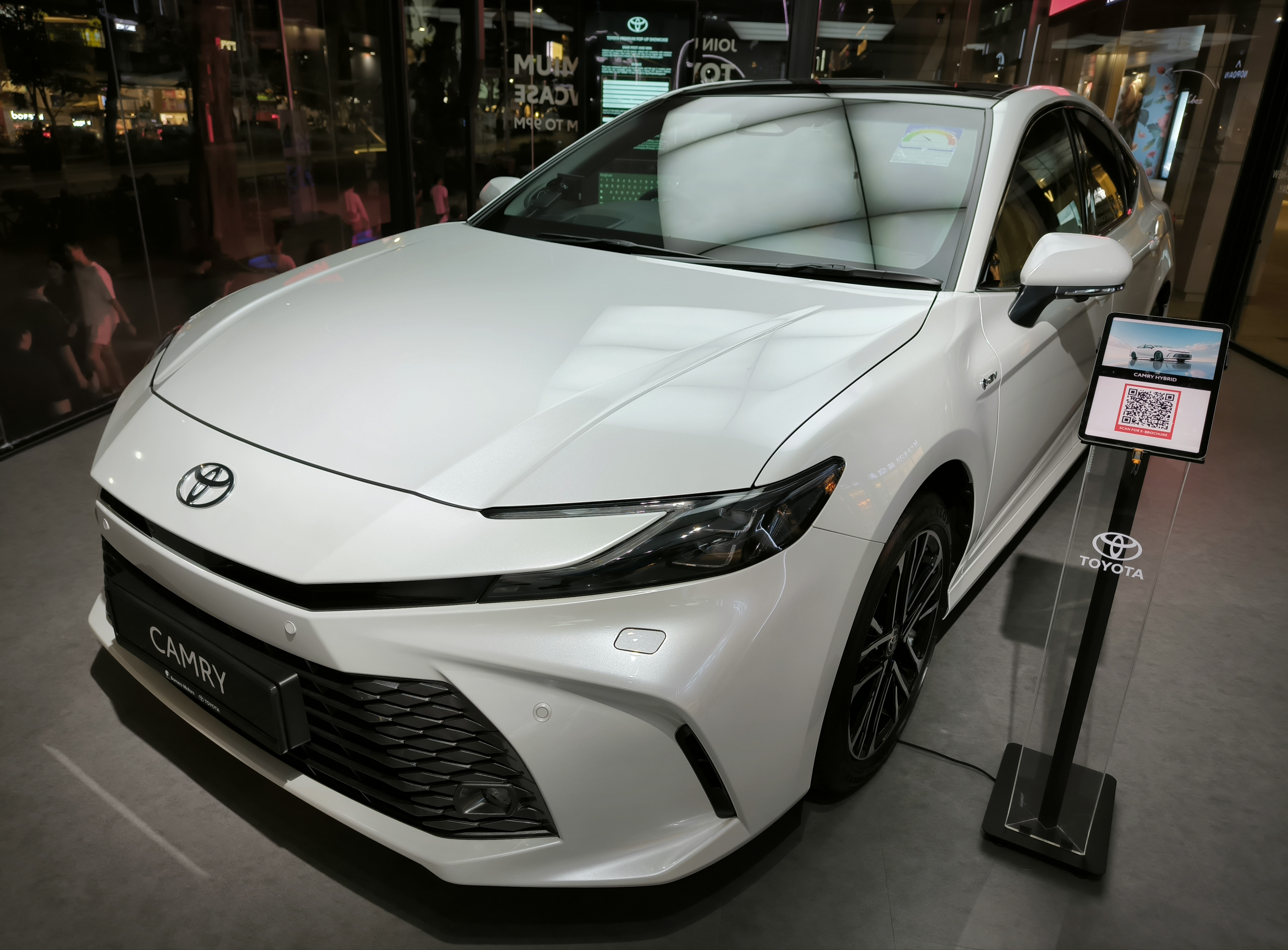
Toyota Camry Elegance (XV80)(Singapore)

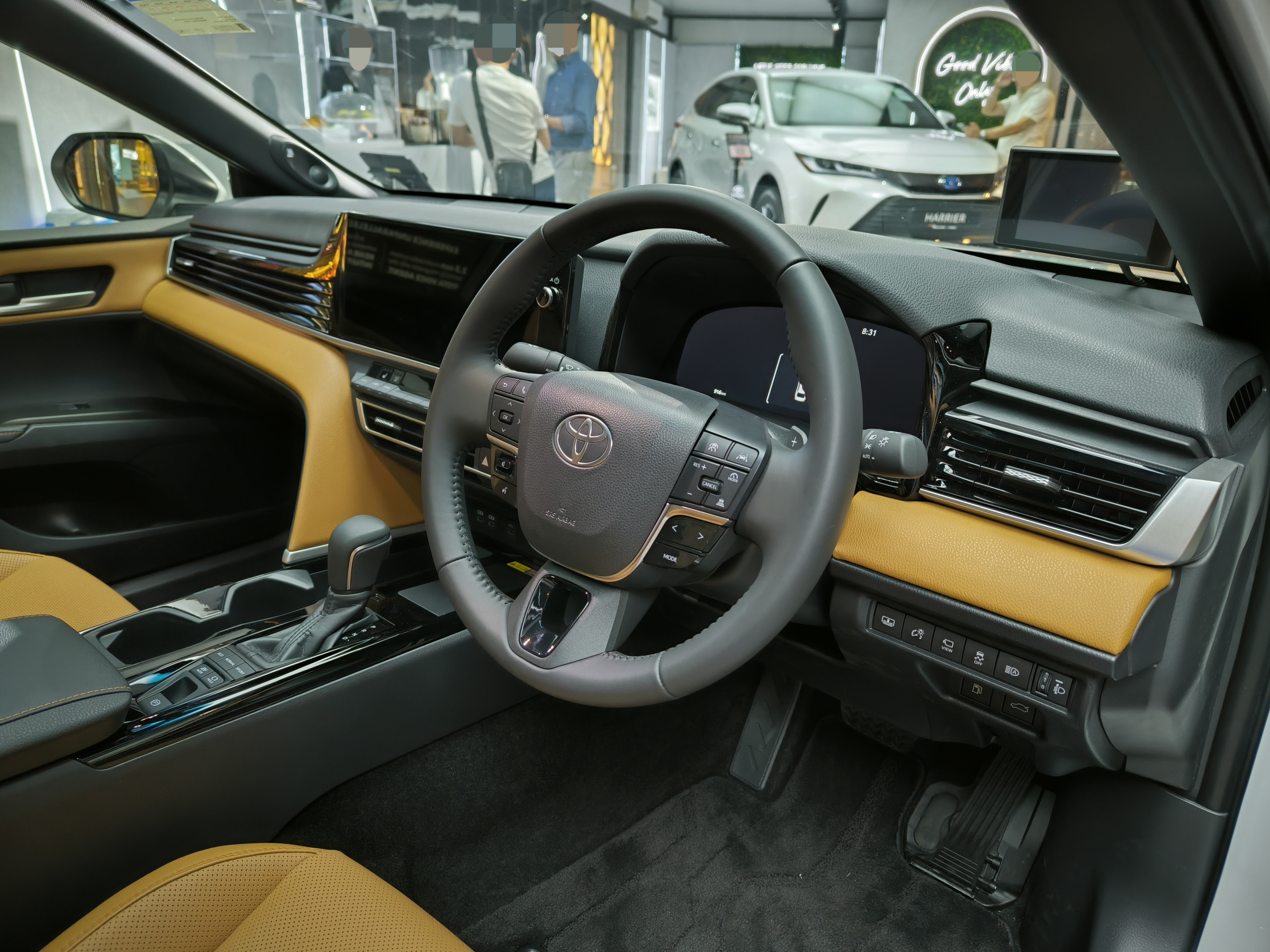
Interior (Singapore)

==== Thailand ====
The Camry XV80 was launched in Thailand on 10 October 2024. It is available in three trim levels: HEV Smart, HEV Premium and HEV Premium Luxury. All variants are powered by a 2.5-liter gasoline hybrid powertrain.

==== Vietnam ====
The XV80 Camry was launched during the 2024 Vietnam Motor Show on 23 October 2024. Imported from Thailand, three grades are available: 2.0 Q, 2.5 HEV Mid and 2.5 HEV Top, the Q grade is powered by a 2.0-liter gasoline powertrain, while the HEV Mid and Top variants are powered by a 2.5-liter gasoline hybrid powertrain.

== Safety ==
IIHS scores (US model year 2025)
Small overlap front	Good
Moderate overlap front (updated test)	Good
Side (updated test)	Good
Headlights	Acceptable
Front crash prevention (vehicle-to-pedestrian)	Good
Seatbelt reminders	Good
Child seat anchors (LATCH) ease of use	Good

ANCAP test results Toyota Camry Hybrid (2024, aligned with Euro NCAP)
Test	Points	%
Overall:	5 /5 stars	
Adult occupant:	38.40	95%
Child occupant:	42.66	87%
Pedestrian:	53.15	84%
Safety assist:	14.76	81%

C-NCAP test results 2024 Toyota Camry 2.0HG Premium Hybrid
Category		%
Overall:	5 /5 stars	88.9%
Occupant protection:		89.21%
Vulnerable road users:		80.46%
Active safety:		93.02%
