= Toyota Camry (XV70) =

Eighth generation of Toyota Camry

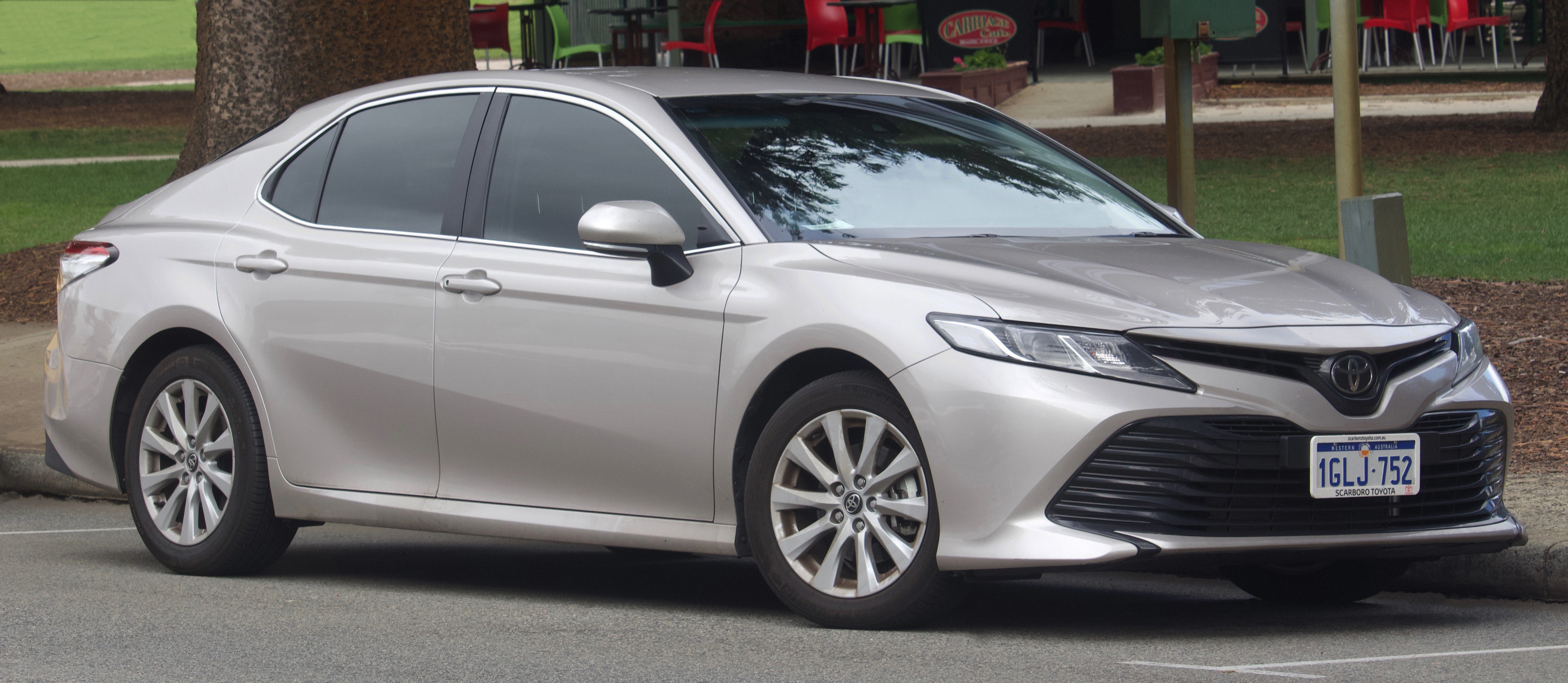
- 2018 Toyota Camry Ascent (ASV70; pre-facelift, Australia)

Overview
- Manufacturer: Toyota
- Also called: Daihatsu Altis (Japan)
- Production: June 2017 – December 2023 (Japan); June 2017 – April 2024 (US); December 2017 – October 2023 (China); April 2018 – March 2022 (Russia); October 2018 – October 2024 (Thailand); January 2019 – December 2024 (India)
- Model years: 2018–2024
- Assembly: Japan: Toyota, Aichi (Tsutsumi plant); United States: Georgetown, Kentucky (TMMK); China: Nansha, Guangzhou (GAC Toyota); Thailand: Chachoengsao (TMT); India: Bidadi (TKML); Russia: Saint Petersburg (TMMR)
- Designer: Ian Cartabiano (Concept leader, Exterior SE/XSE, US-Specification: 2014, 2015); Shin Okahara (regular exterior: 2014); Ken Kubota (Project chief designer); Toshimitsu Araki (interior design: 2014); Chinatsu Kato (colours & trim: 2015–16)

Body and chassis
- Class: Mid-size car
- Body style: 4-door sedan
- Layout: Front-engine, front-wheel-drive; Front-engine, four-wheel-drive
- Platform: TNGA: GA-K
- Related: Lexus ES (XZ10); Toyota Avalon (XX50)

Powertrain
- Engine: Petrol; 2.0 L 6AR-FSE I4; 2.0 L M20A-FKS I4; 2.0 L M20C-FKS I4 (China); 2.0 L 6AR-FBS I4; 2.5 L 2AR-FE I4; 2.5 L A25A-FKS I4; 2.5 L A25A-FKB I4; 2.5 L A25C-FKS I4 (China); 3.5 L 2GR-FKS V6; Petrol hybrid; 2.5 L A25A-FXS I4; 2.5 L A25D-FXS I4 (China)
- Electric motor: 88 kW (118 hp; 120 PS) 3NM permanent magnet synchronous (hybrid)
- Transmission: 6-speed U761E automatic (6AR-FSE, 6AR-FBS, 2AR-FE); 8-speed UA80E automatic (2GR-FKS); 8-speed UB80E automatic (A25A-FKS, A25A-FKB); K120 CVT with physical first gear; Aisin Seiki T110 eCVT (hybrid)
- Hybrid drivetrain: Power-split (hybrid)
- Battery: 6.5 Ah (1.6 kW·h) 244.8V NiMH; 1.0 kW·h 259V Li-ion (Hybrid LE; North America)

Dimensions
- Wheelbase: 2,820 mm (111.2 in)
- Length: 4,880–4,910 mm (192.1–193.3 in)
- Width: 1,840 mm (72.4 in)
- Height: 1,445 mm (56.88 in)
- Curb weight: 1,480–1,660 kg (3,262–3,659 lb)

Chronology
- Predecessor: Toyota Camry (XV50)
- Successor: Toyota Camry (XV80)

The Toyota Camry (XV70) is a mid-size car produced by Toyota from June 2017 to October 2024. Replacing the XV50 series, the XV70 represented the eighth generation of the Toyota Camry in all markets outside Japan, which followed a different generational lineage. The XV70 Camry was introduced at the 2017 North American International Auto Show, it is built on the GA-K platform.

== Markets ==
The XV70 Camry was first launched in Japan on 10 July 2017. North American production started in June 2017 and sales began in late July 2017.

For the North American market, due to the need to equip Toyota Motor Manufacturing Kentucky with new equipment for the Toyota New Global Architecture, a small portion of the initial batch of the XV70-series Camry was sourced from the Tsutsumi plant in Japan. For the Australian market, the XV70 Camry was imported from Japan and launched on 21 November 2017. This followed the termination of 55 years of Toyota production in Australia, including the closure of the Camry plant (Toyota Australia Altona Plant), Altona, Victoria. The XV70 Camry also replaced the Camry-based Aurion, which was discontinued in Australia after 11 years.

The XV70 Camry was launched in Thailand on 29 October 2018.

It was also revealed for the Malaysian market on 1 November 2018 and launched on 22 November 2018 at the Kuala Lumpur International Motor Show. In the Philippines, it was launched on 10 December 2018.

It was also launched in Indonesia on 8 January 2019, in Singapore on 10 January 2019 at the Singapore Motorshow, in India and Brunei on 18 January 2019, and in Vietnam on 23 April 2019. It has been available in Western Europe since April 2019, replacing the Avensis, returning to this market after 14 years of absence.

== Trim levels ==
Each trim level would feature a different front fascia to differentiate it from other Camry models.

Trim Levels for the Japanese Camry include X, G, WS, G Leather Package and WS Leather Package with the fuel system only being Hybrid. Trim levels for the North American Camry include L, LE, SE, XLE, XSE, XLE V6 and XSE V6, as well as LE, SE and XLE versions of the Camry Hybrid. In 2019, for the 2020 model year, the TRD Camry trim level was introduced. It was based on the SE trim and only available with a V6; it comes with sportier suspension, sports exhaust, body kit, trunk spoiler, special TRD-badged interior and red seat belts.

In Puerto Rico, it is available with both petrol and hybrid engines, the TRD sports sedan versions are not available there.

In Guam, it is sold only as LE and XSE hybrid versions.

Trim levels for the Australian Camry include Ascent, Ascent Sport, SX and SL, as well as Ascent, Ascent Sport and SL versions of the Camry Hybrid. The Camry XV70 is the first generation to be imported into Australia since the closure of manufacturing at Toyota Australia's Altona plant in 2017. The Camry is now imported from Japan's Toyota, Aichi plant.

Trim levels for the Thai market Camry include 2.0 G, 2.5 G, 2.5 HV and 2.5 HV Premium, while the Malaysian Camry is only available in 2.5 V trim. Trim levels for the Philippine Camry include 2.5 G and 2.5 V. Trim levels for the Indonesian Camry include 2.5 G and 2.5 V, as well as the Camry Hybrid. Trim levels for the Vietnamese Camry include 2.0 G and 2.5 Q. In Singapore, the Camry is offered in 2.0-litre and 2.5-litre engine options. Only the Camry Hybrid is offered in India. In Brunei, the Camry is only offered in 2.5-litre engine option. For the Chinese market, trim levels consist of 2.0 G, 2.0 E, 2.0 S, 2.5 G, 2.5 Q, 2.5 S, 2.5 HG and 2.5 HQ. Engine choice consisted of the 6AR-FSE, the A25A and the A25B. The 6AR-FSE engine was replaced for the 2019 model year with the 2 litre M20A-FKS, which also powers the Toyota Corolla (E210). Gearbox choices are a 6-speed automatic for 2.0-litre models (6AR-FSE only), an 8-speed automatic for the 2.5G, Q and S and the CVT gearbox for the 2.0 E, 2.0 G, 2.0 S, 2.5HG and 2.5HQ. In Germany, the Camry Hybrid is offered in Business Edition and Executive trim levels. In the United Kingdom, the Camry Hybrid is offered in Design and Excel trim levels.

Engine choices include a base 2.5 L inline four-cylinder (I4) that now produces 151 kW (203 hp) in base form (155 kW (208 hp) when equipped with the optional quad exhaust), the same 2.5 L inline four-cylinder (I4) engine with an electric motor (Hybrid) that produces 155 kW (208 hp), or the top-of-the-line 3.5 L V6 that produces 224 kW (301 hp). In some markets the old 2.5 L 2AR-FE engine is carried over from the previous generation which produces 133 kW (178 hp).

The only major component that is shared with the previous-generation is the Toyota emblem on the front grille and rear trunk lid.

The Camry would be the first Toyota vehicle to introduce the Entune 3.0 System, which, powered by Linux, would be an "Open-Source" operating system (OS), providing for developers to develop different applications that would work with the infotainment system.

Transmission choices include a simulated six-speed sequential shift automatic (CVT) for Hybrid models, six-speed automatic for the 2.5L 2AR-FE engine or an eight-speed automatic for the 2.5L A25A-FKS/A25A-FKB and V6 powered Camrys.

As with all Toyota vehicles, Toyota Safety Sense would come as standard equipment on all Camry models, bringing standard a pre-collision system with pedestrian detection, a full-speed radar cruise control, lane departure warning with steering assist, and automatic high beam assist. Optional safety features would include active blind spot monitoring with rear cross-traffic alert, intelligent clearance sonar, and rear cross-traffic braking.

In 2019, for the 2020 model year, the Camry became available in North America with AWD for the first time since 1991. AWD is only available on the four-cylinder 2.5L engine mated to an 8-speed automatic transmission.

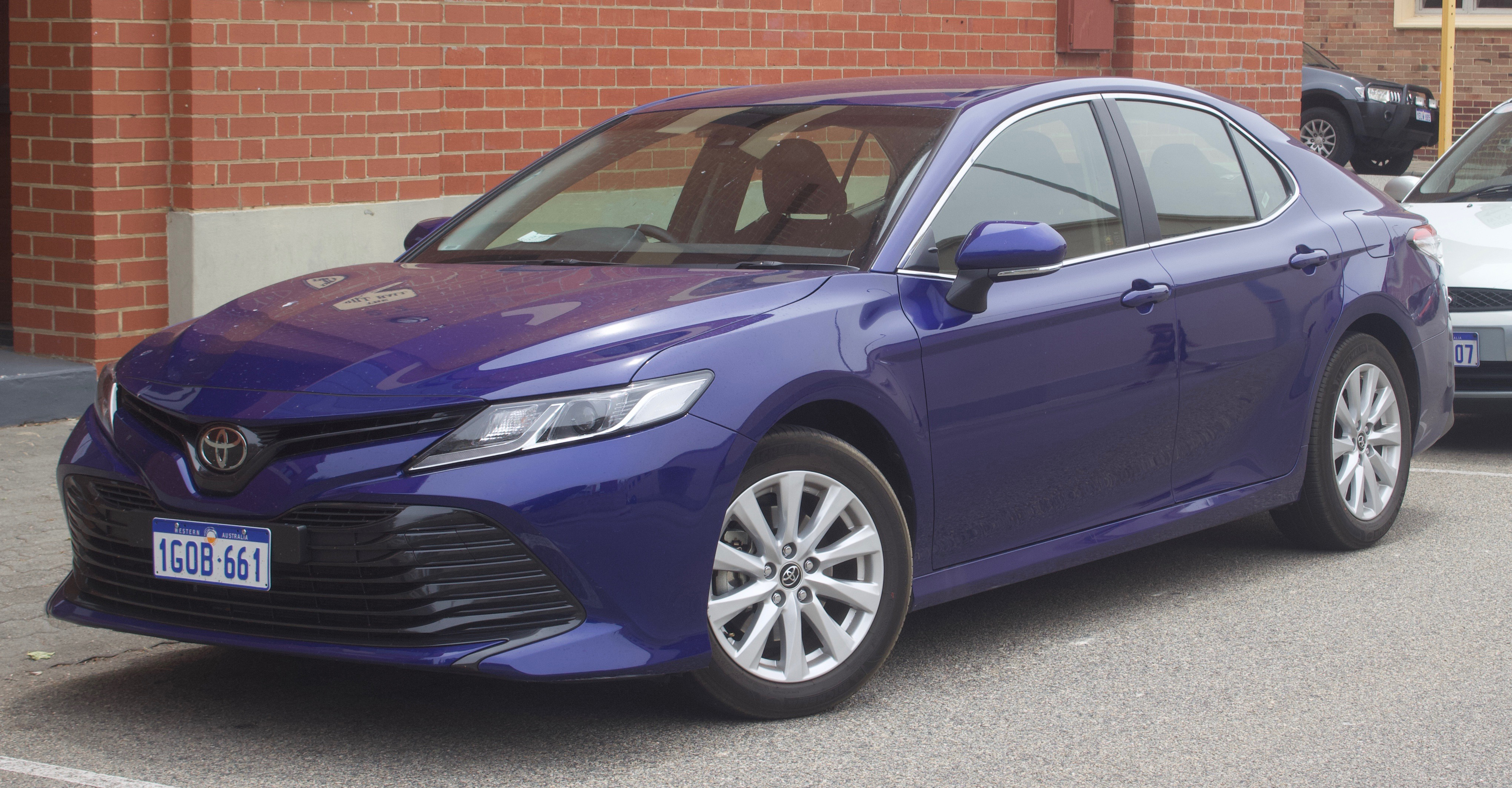
Camry Ascent (Australia, pre-facelift)

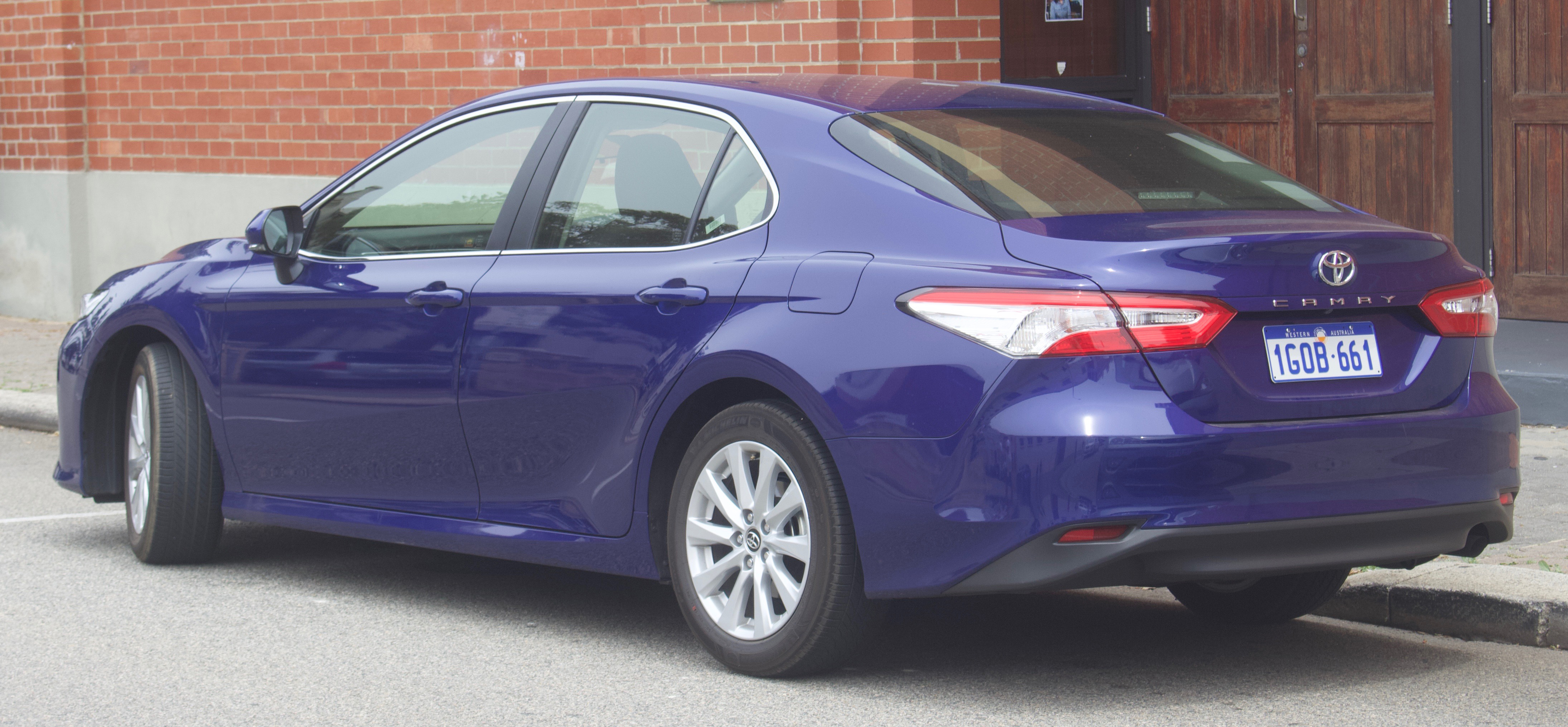
Camry Ascent (Australia, pre-facelift)

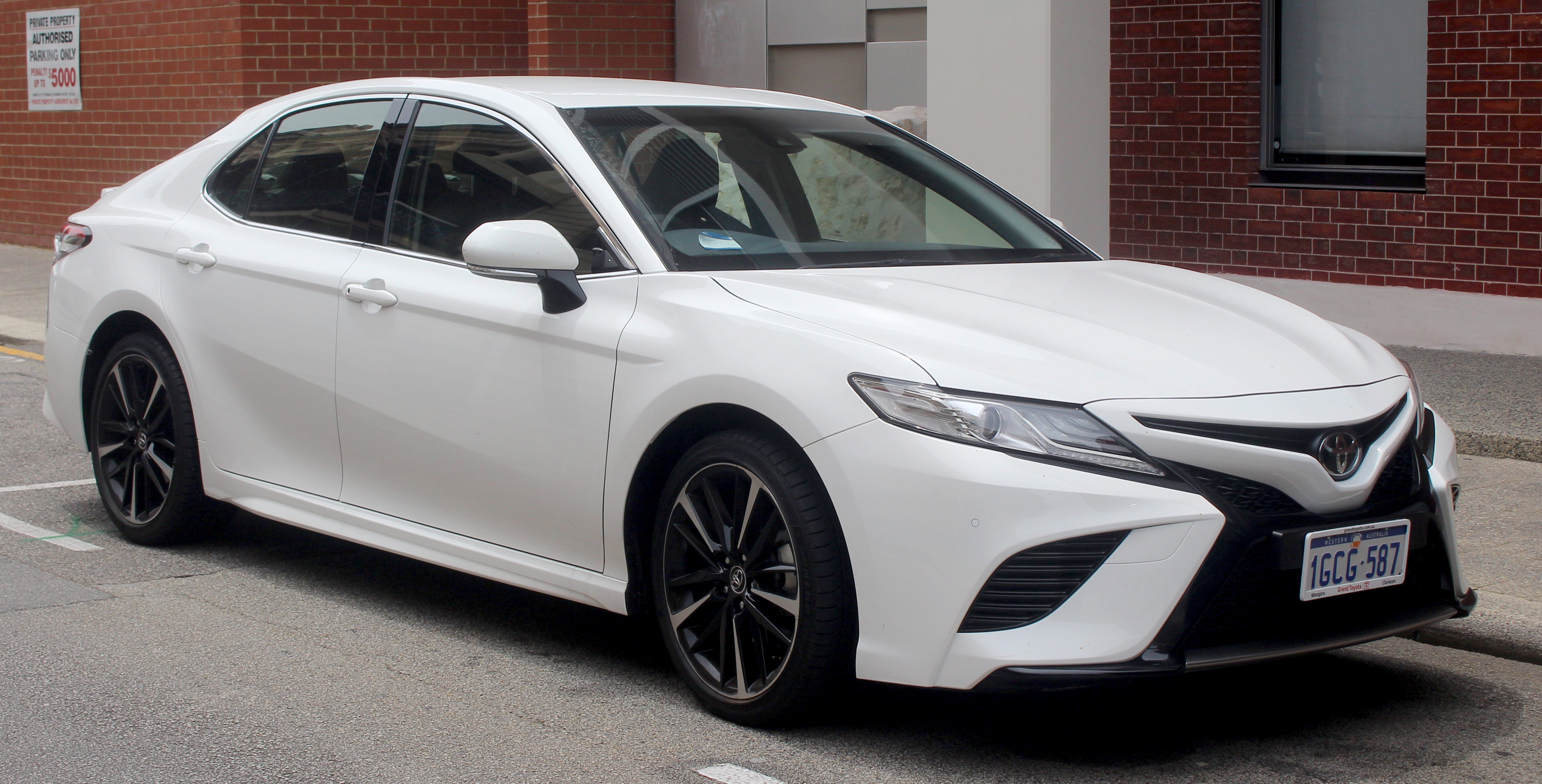
Camry SX (Australia, pre-facelift)

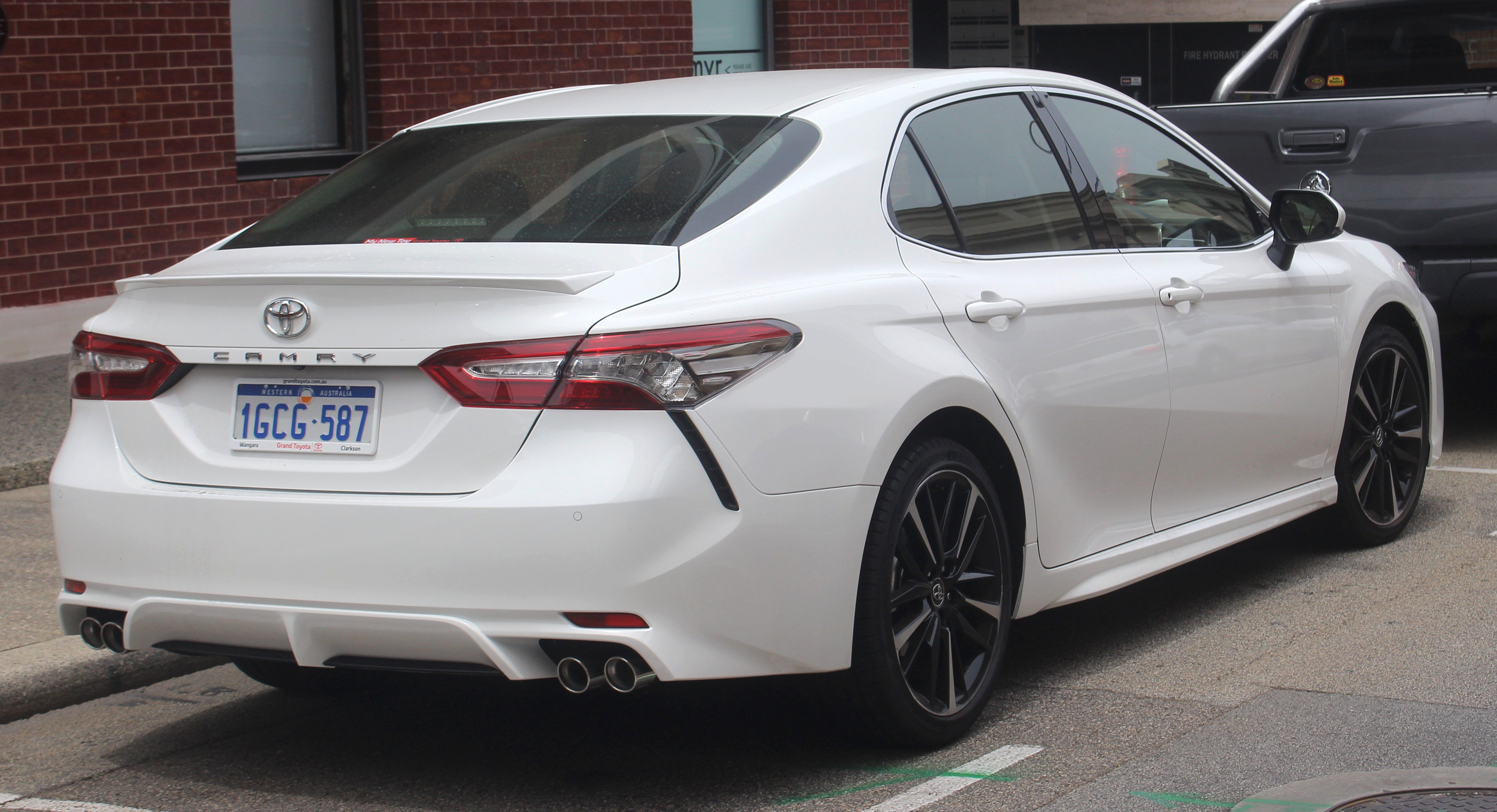
Camry SX (Australia, pre-facelift)

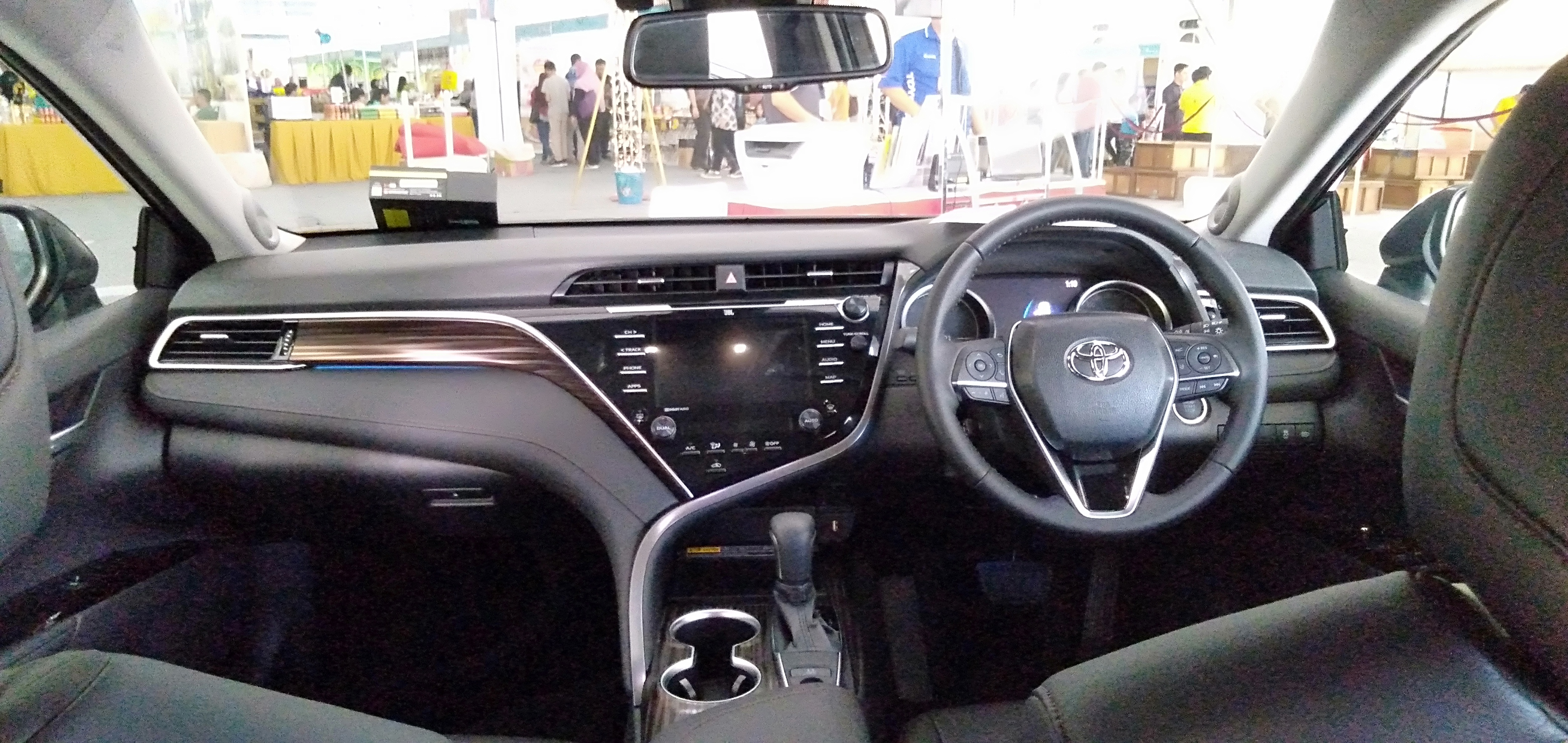
Interior (Brunei, pre-facelift)

== Camry Hybrid ==
Like previous generations, the XV70 Camry is available with a hybrid variant. The hybrid variant combines the 2.5L I4 engine with electric motors. The transmission used is a Sequential Shiftmatic CVT that can simulate the feeling of shifting gears. Combined output of the combustion engine and electric motor is 155 kW (208 hp). Different to previous generations, Toyota moved the battery pack from the trunk to below the rear seats, improving cargo space and creating a lower centre-of-gravity. In the US, the LE used a 1.0 kWh lithium-ion battery pack, while the SE and XLE used a 1.6 kWh nickel-metal hydride pack. The fuel economy for the LE Hybrid is 4.6 L/100 km (61 mpg_{‑imp}; 51 mpg_{‑US}) for city driving, 4.4 L/100 km (64 mpg_{‑imp}; 53 mpg_{‑US}) for highway driving, and 4.5 L/100 km (62 mpg_{‑imp}; 52 mpg_{‑US}) combined, a 30 percent increase. Fuel economy on the SE and XLE Hybrid improved a claimed 21 percent (US combined cycle). Self-reported real world fuel economy improved 16% compared to the previous XV50 hybrid. Contributing to improved fuel economy is the new generation direct injected engine that runs a 14.0:1 compression ratio, plus a more efficient DC-DC converter. On the exterior, the Hybrid model has a unique blue tint around the Toyota badge.

== Facelift ==
In 2020, for the 2021 model year, when the Camry received its facelift, the L was dropped and the XSE Hybrid was added. Also, the Android Auto was added, a new 7- and 9-inch floating multimedia displays and also one of the first Toyotas to debut new Toyota Safety Sense 2.5+. It consists of an updated Pre-Collision System (PCS) with Pedestrian Detection, which now enhanced with intersection support and emergency steering assist, as well an updated Dynamic Radar Cruise Control, which now improved with Curve Speed Management.

The facelifted North American Camry was unveiled on 15 July 2020 and went on sale in October 2020. The facelifted Camry was also released in Japan on 1 February 2021, in Australia on 15 April 2021, in Indonesia on 29 October 2021, in Thailand on 3 November 2021, in the Philippines on 9 December 2021, in Vietnam on 17 December 2021, in Malaysia on 17 February 2022, and in Brunei in May 2022.

For the Indonesian market, the 2.5 G trim was removed from the lineup, leaving only the 2.5 V and 2.5 Hybrid trim levels.

For the Thai market, the 2.0 G trim was removed from the lineup, leaving only the 2.5 Sport, 2.5 Premium, 2.5 Hybrid Premium and 2.5 Hybrid Premium Luxury trim levels.

For the Philippine market, the 2.5 G and 2.5 V trims were removed from the lineup and was replaced by the 2.5 V Hybrid trim.

For the Vietnamese market, the 2.0 Q and 2.5 Hybrid trims were added to the lineup alongside the 2.0 G and 2.5 Q grades, making the Camry available in four models.

The Camry was withdrawn from the United Kingdom in November 2021.

In the United States in 2021, for the 2022 model year, the Nightshade package became available on the hybrid as well as a new exclusive colour for the TRD trim level.

In the United States in 2022, for the 2023 model year, adds a new colour Reservoir Blue for the Nightshade package and Ice Cap replaces Super White. Cavalry Blue becomes available for the SE & XSE trims.

After 43 years, the Camry will be discontinued in Japan by the end of 2023 due to poor sales.

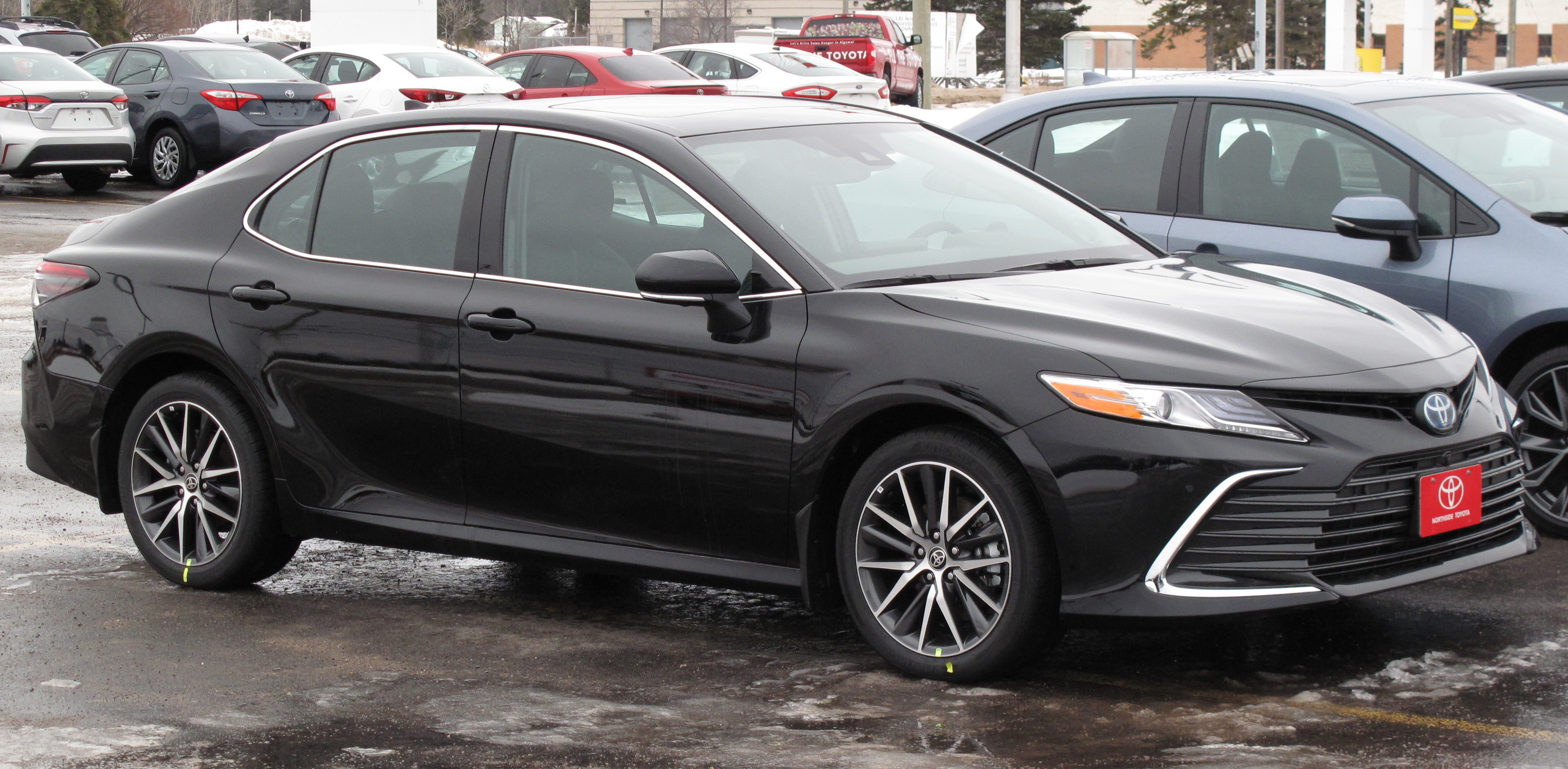
Camry Hybrid XLE (Canada, facelift)

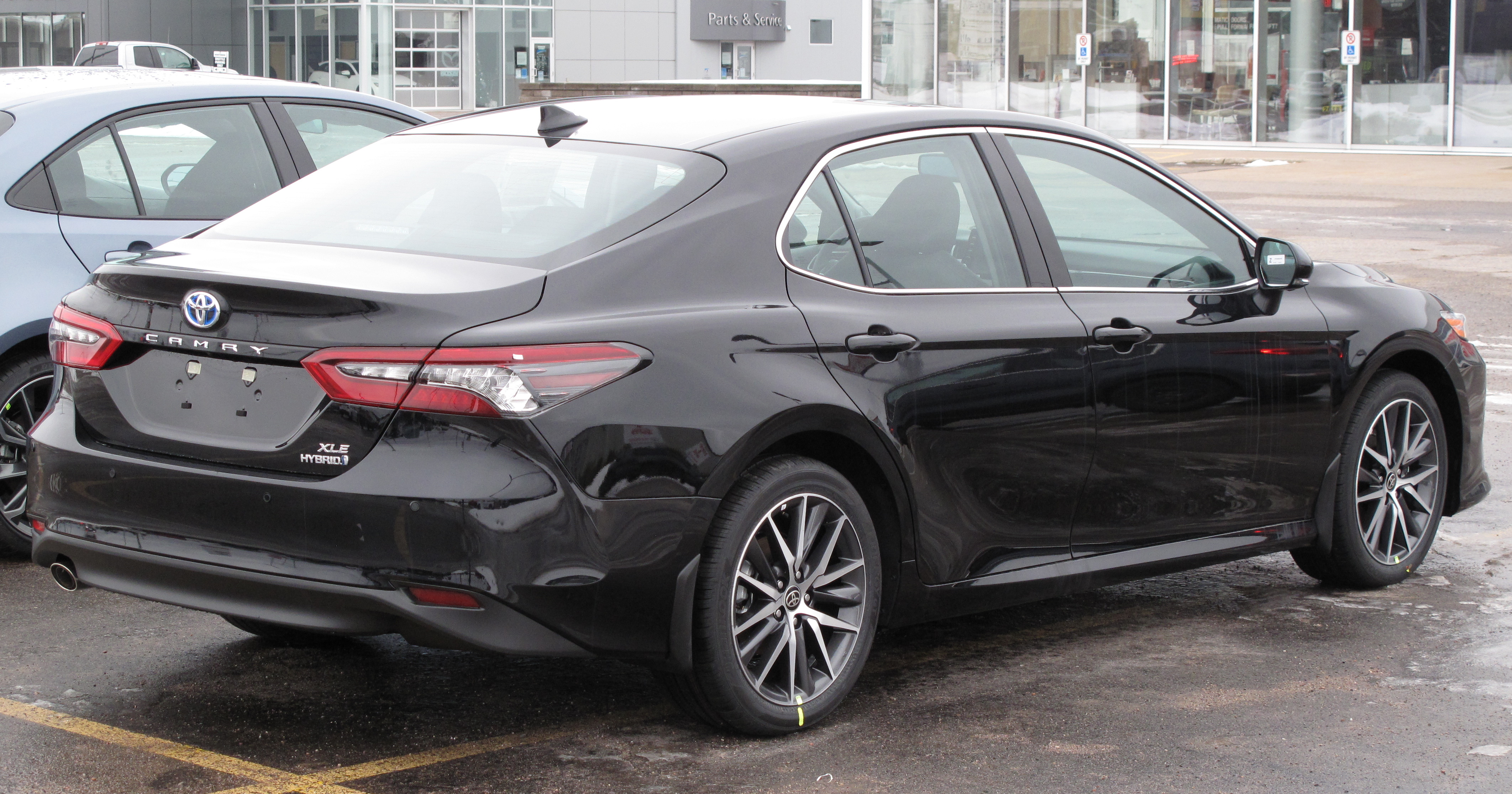
Camry Hybrid XLE (Canada, facelift)

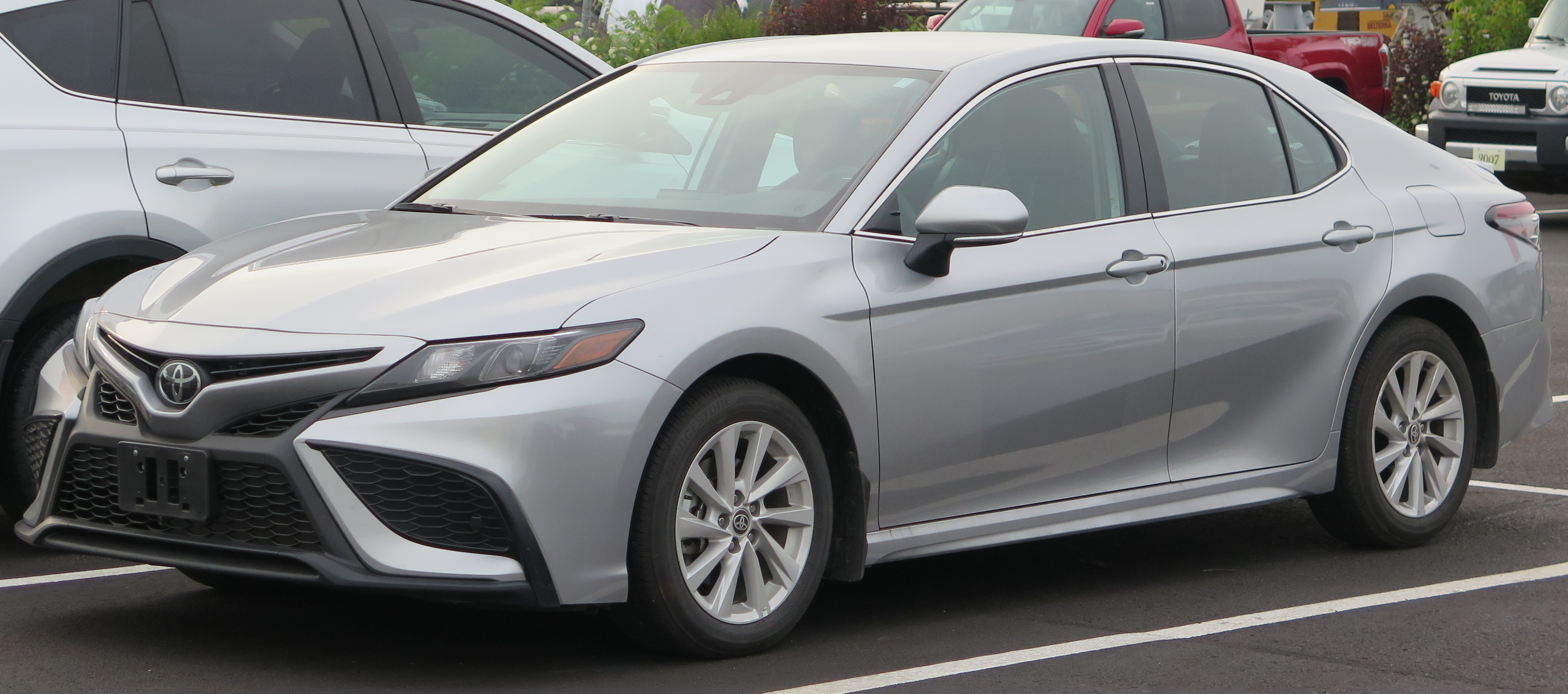
Camry SE Standard Package (Canada, facelift)

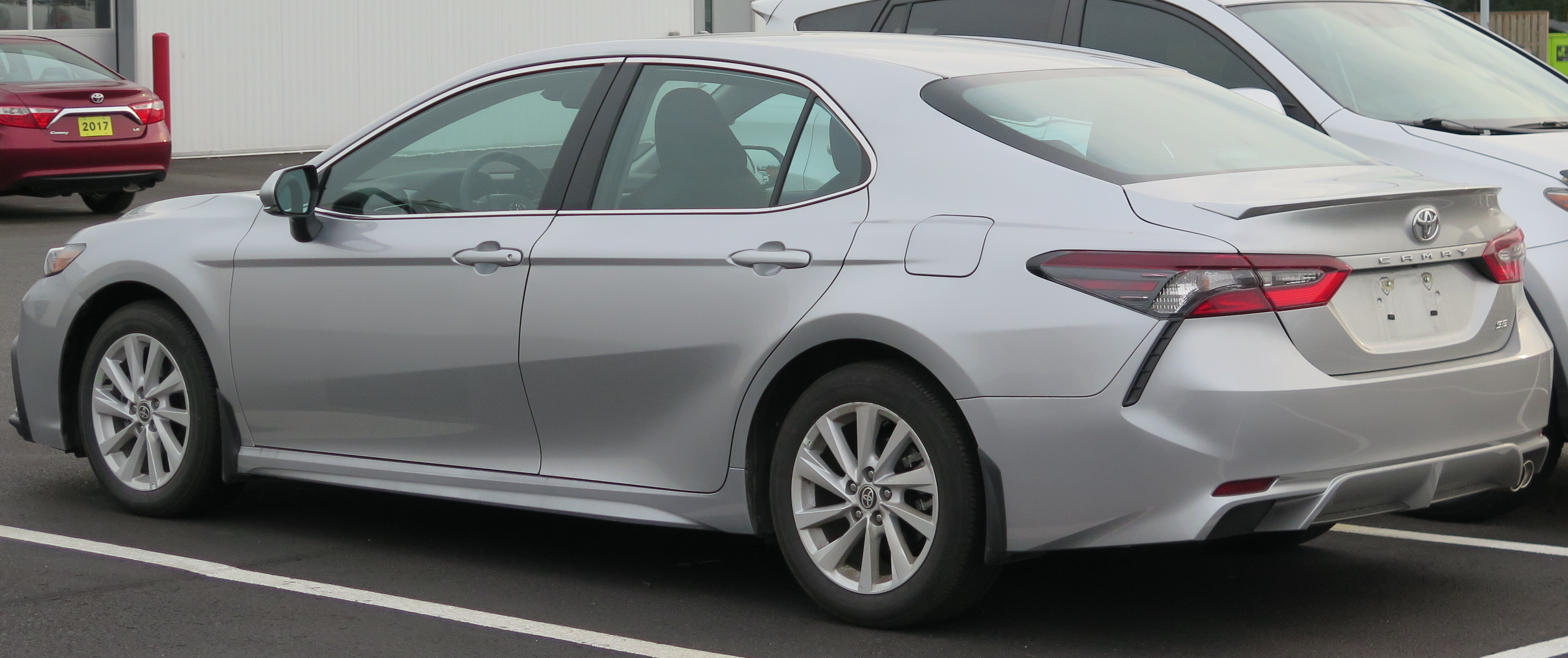
Camry SE Standard Package (Canada, facelift)

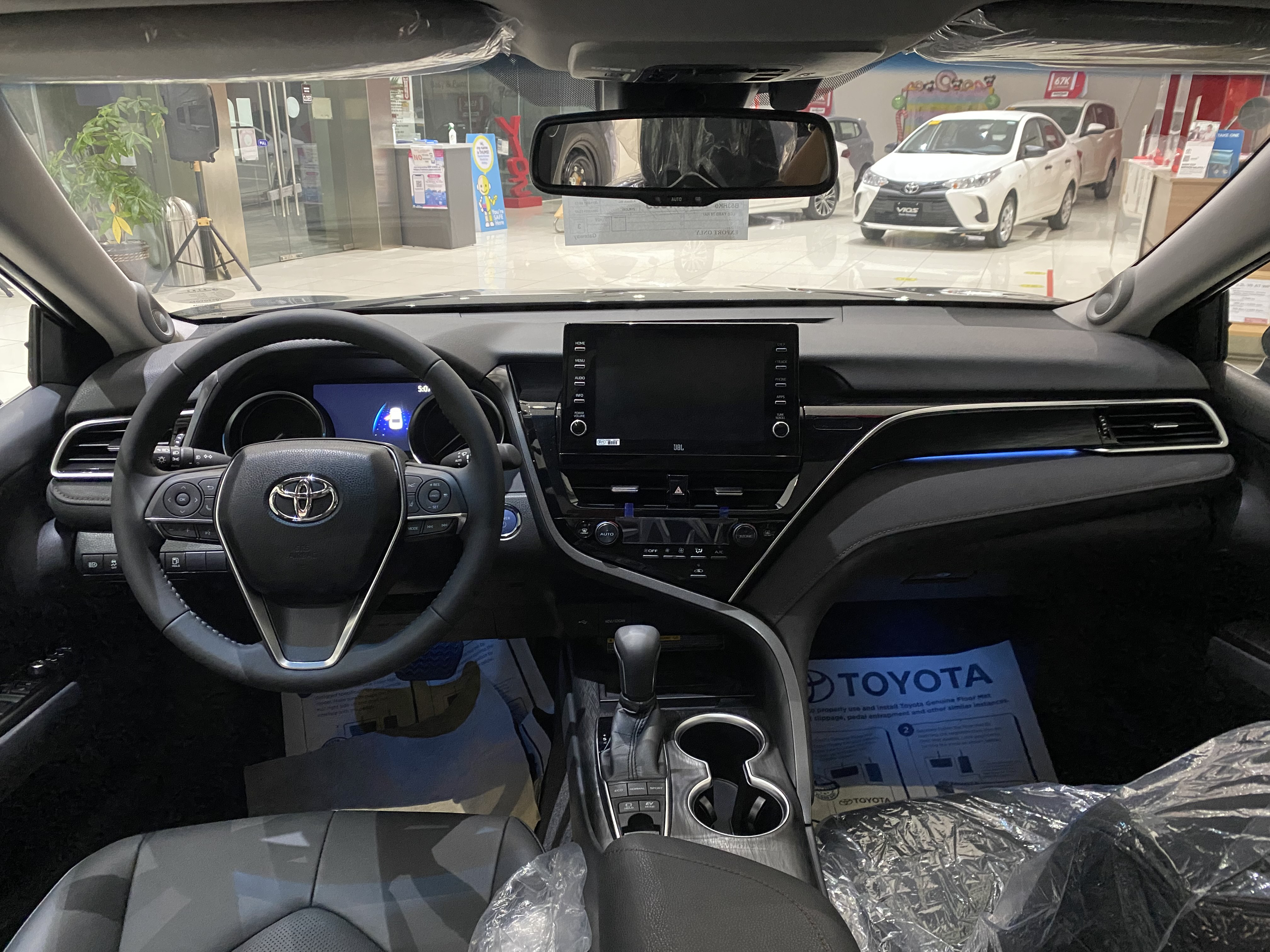
Interior (Philippines, facelift)

== Engines ==
Chassis	Model	Engine	Power	Torque	Transmission
XV70	ASV71 (FWD)	2.0 L 6AR-FSE inline-four (petrol)	123 kW (165 hp; 167 PS)	199 N⋅m (147 lb⋅ft)	6-speed U761E automatic
XV70	ASV71 (FWD)	2.0 L 6AR-FBS inline-four (petrol)	123 kW (165 hp; 167 PS)	199 N⋅m (147 lb⋅ft)	6-speed U761E automatic
XV70	MXVA71 (FWD)	2.0 L M20A-FKS inline-four (petrol)	131 kW (176 hp; 178 PS)	210 N⋅m (155 lb⋅ft)	CVT K120 automatic
XV70	ASV70 (FWD)	2.5 L 2AR-FE inline-four (petrol)	132 kW (177 hp; 179 PS)	233 N⋅m (172 lb⋅ft)	6-speed U761E automatic
XV70	AXVA70 (FWD)	2.5 L A25A-FKS inline-four (petrol)	151.5 kW (203 hp; 206 PS)	249 N⋅m (184 lb⋅ft)	8-speed UB80E automatic
XV70	AXVA70 (FWD)	2.5 L A25A-FKS inline-four (petrol)	153.5 kW (206 hp; 209 PS)	252 N⋅m (186 lb⋅ft)	8-speed UB80E automatic
XV70	AXVA70 (FWD)	2.5 L A25A-FKB inline-four (petrol)	154 kW (207 hp; 209 PS)	250 N⋅m (184 lb⋅ft)	8-speed UB80E automatic
XV70	AXVA75 (AWD)	2.5 L A25A-FKS inline-four (petrol)	151 kW (202 hp; 205 PS)	247 N⋅m (182 lb⋅ft)	8-speed UB80E automatic
XV70	AXVH70 (FWD)	2.5 L A25A-FXS I4 (petrol hybrid) + 5NM Electric motor	131 kW (176 hp; 178 PS)	221 N⋅m (163 lb⋅ft)	eCVT T110 automatic
XV70	AXVH75 (AWD)	2.5 L A25A-FXS I4 (petrol hybrid) + 5NM Electric motor	131 kW (176 hp; 178 PS)	221 N⋅m (163 lb⋅ft)	eCVT T110 automatic
XV70	GSV70 (FWD)	3.5 L 2GR-FKS V6 (petrol)	224 kW (300 hp; 305 PS)	362 N⋅m (267 lb⋅ft)	8-speed UA80E automatic

== Safety ==
ASEAN NCAP test results Toyota Camry (2018)
Test	Points
Overall:	5 /5 stars
Adult occupant:	49.004
Child occupant:	22.68
Safety assist:	19.75

ANCAP test results Toyota Camry all variants (2017)
Test	Score
Overall	5 /5 stars
Frontal offset	15.16/16
Side impact	16/16
Pole	2/2
Seat belt reminders	3/3
Whiplash protection	Good
Pedestrian protection	Adequate
Electronic stability control	Standard

ANCAP test results Toyota Camry all variants (2017)
Test	Score
Overall	5 /5 stars
Frontal offset	15.16/16
Side impact	16/16
Pole	2/2
Seat belt reminders	3/3
Whiplash protection	Good
Pedestrian protection	Adequate
Electronic stability control	Standard
