= Toyota Opa =

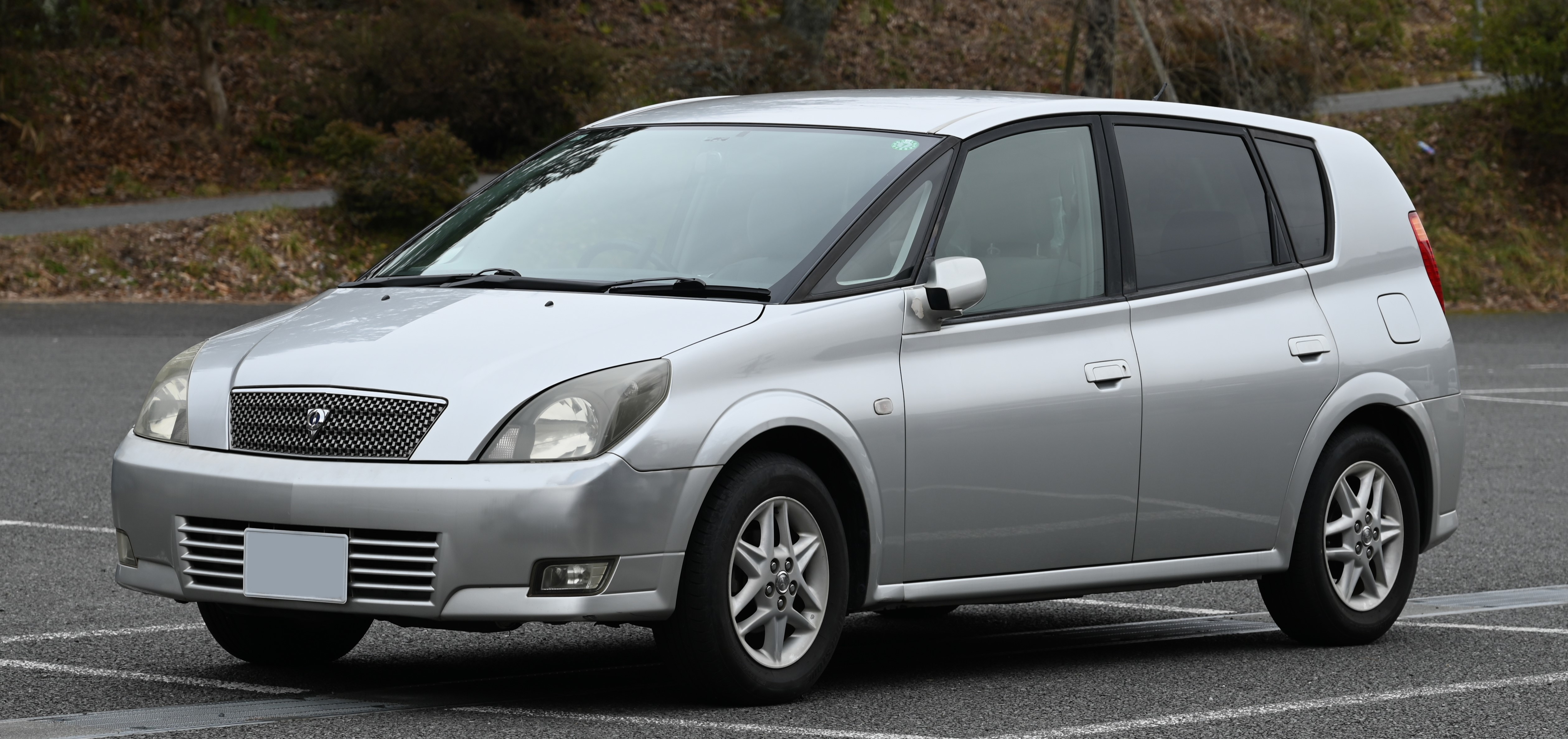
- 2000 Toyota Opa

Overview
- Manufacturer: Toyota
- Model code: XT10
- Production: January 2000 – July 2005
- Assembly: Japan: Toyota City, Aichi (Tsutsumi plant)

Body and chassis
- Class: Compact car
- Body style: 5-door hatchback
- Layout: Front-engine, front-wheel-drive Front-engine, four-wheel-drive (1.8 L only)
- Platform: Toyota MC platform
- Related: Toyota Vista (V50)

Powertrain
- Engine: Petrol: 1794 cc 1ZZ-FE I4 (ZCT10/15); 1998 cc 1AZ-FSE I4 (ACT10)
- Transmission: 4-speed automatic (1.8 L); CVT (2.0 L)

Dimensions
- Wheelbase: 2,700 mm (110 in)
- Length: 4,250 mm (167 in)
- Width: 1,695 mm (66.7 in)
- Height: 1,525 mm (60.0 in)
- Curb weight: 1,210–1,310 kg (2,668–2,888 lb)

The Toyota Opa (Japanese: トヨタ・Opa (オーパ), Hepburn: Toyota Ōpa) is a compact car produced by Toyota. Its name derives from the exclamation for surprise in Portuguese.

It was introduced at the October 1999 Tokyo Motor Show as a prototype car, and was put into production in January 2000. It was the result of the V50 Vista Ardeo wagon modified into a 5-door hatchback. The transmission shifter was relocated from the floor between the front seats to a location on the lower portion of the dashboard, allowing passengers to walk to the rear area from either front seat. It was initially available with the 1.8-litre 1ZZ-FE engine. Later in August 2000, the Opa was offered to customers with the 2.0-litre 1AZ-FSE engine and a continuously variable transmission. In January 2001, GPS navigation was offered as an option.

The Opa was exclusive to Toyopet Store locations as a larger companion to the Caldina station wagon. It was discontinued in August 2005.

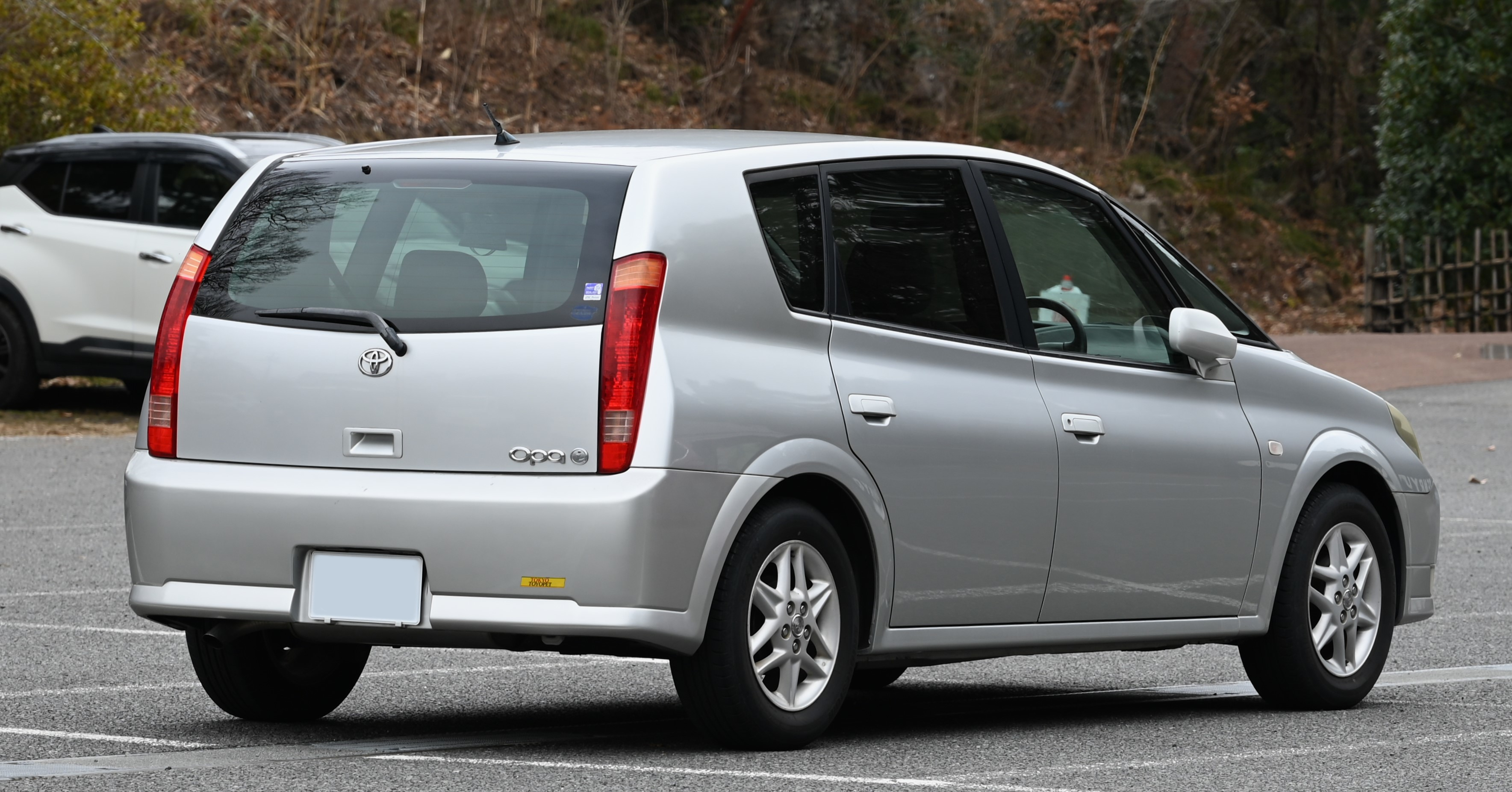
Rear view

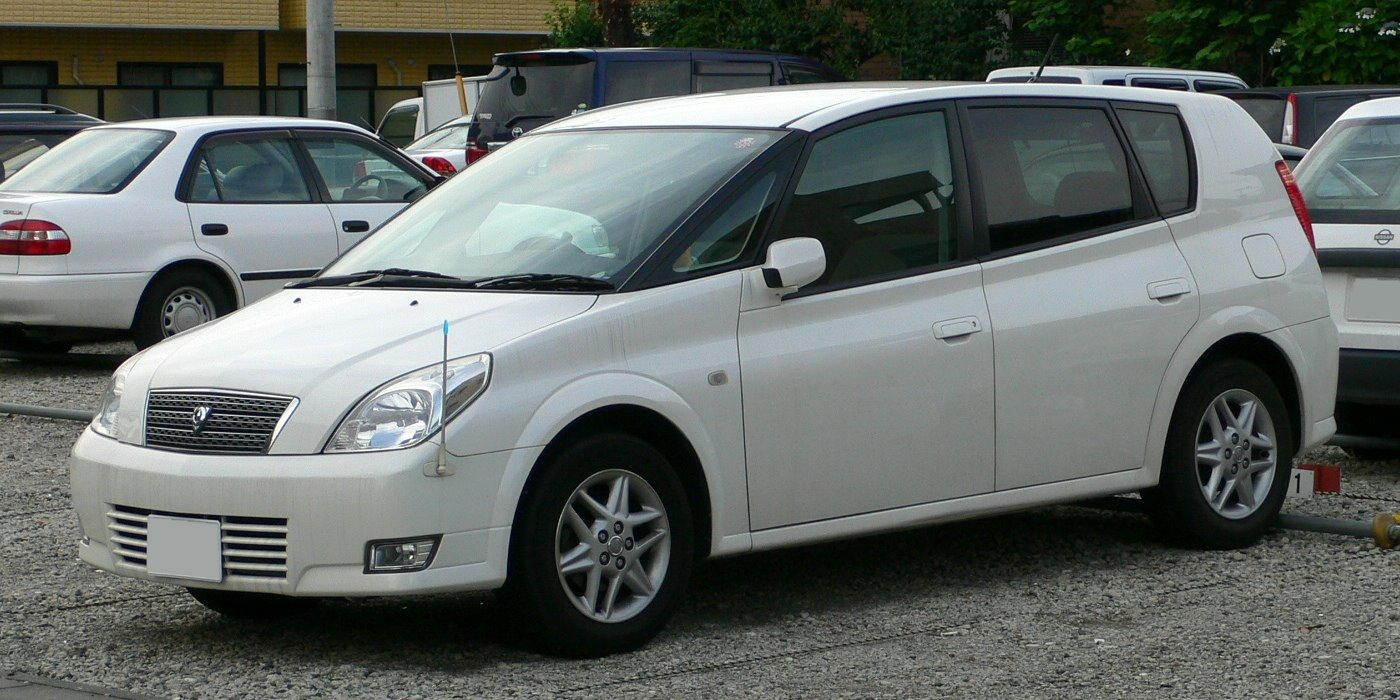
2002 Toyota Opa
