= Toyota RAV4 =

Compact crossover SUV

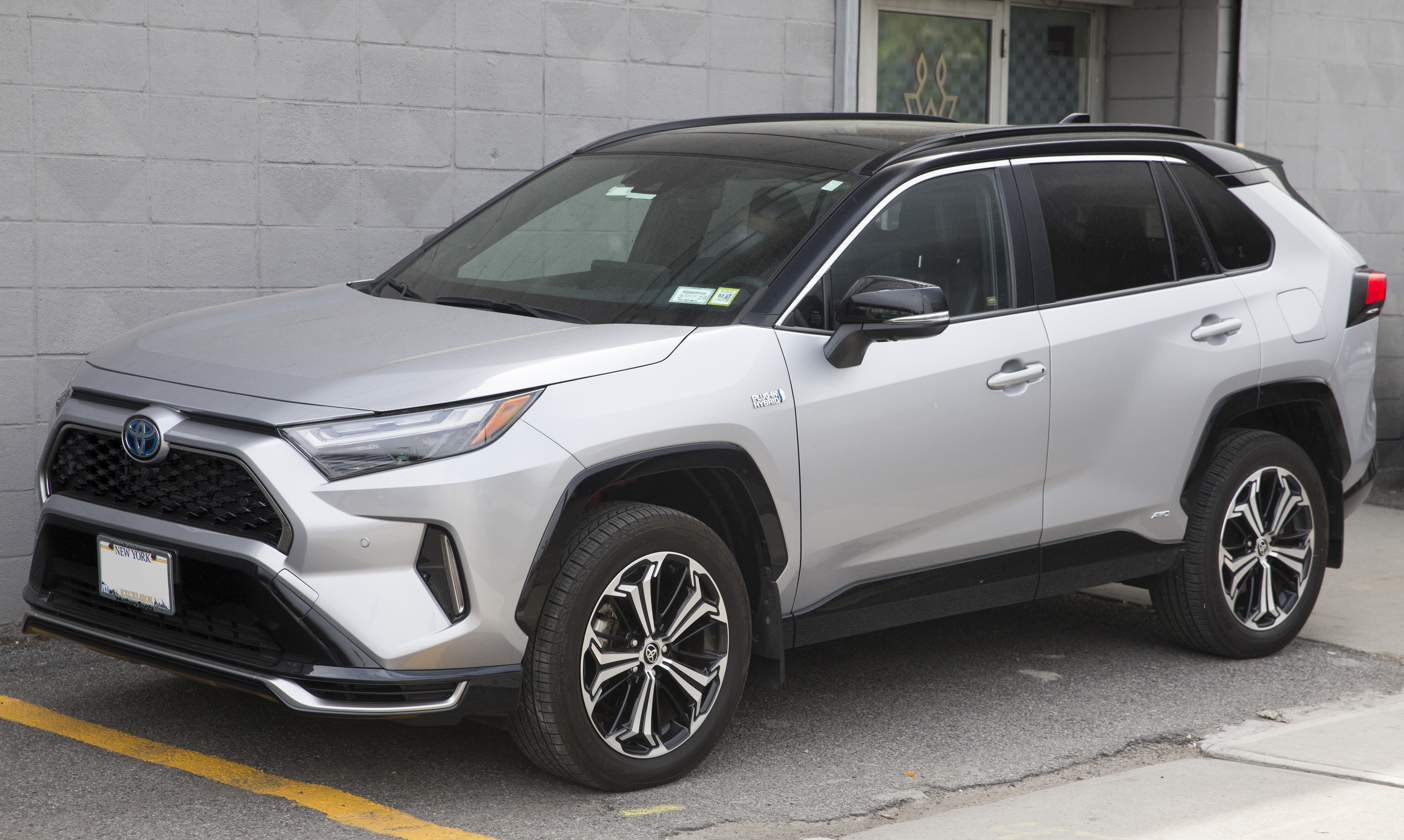
- Toyota RAV4 Prime XSE (XA50)

Overview
- Manufacturer: Toyota
- Also called: Toyota Vanguard (Japan, 2007–2013); Toyota Wildlander (China, 2020–present); Suzuki Across (Europe, 2020–present)
- Production: 1994–present

Body and chassis
- Class: Compact crossover SUV
- Layout: Front-engine, front-wheel-drive; Front-engine, four-wheel-drive
- Chassis: Unibody

The Toyota RAV4 (Japanese: トヨタ・RAV4, Hepburn: Toyota Ravufō) is a compact crossover SUV produced by the Japanese automobile manufacturer Toyota. Having sold over 15 million units worldwide as of 2025, the RAV4 is the best-selling SUV of all time. The car is credited with popularizing compact crossover automobiles, often credited as the first modern compact crossover SUV. In February 2025, the RAV4 replaced the Ford F-150 as the best-selling car in the United States, after nearly four decades of the latter's reign.

It made its debut in Japan and Europe in 1994, and in North America in 1995, being launched in January 1996. The vehicle was designed for consumers wanting a vehicle that had most of the benefits of SUVs, such as increased cargo room, higher visibility, and the option of full-time four-wheel drive, along with the maneuverability of a mid-size car. The vehicle's name is an abbreviation of "Recreational Active Vehicle with 4-wheel drive", (occasionally "Robust Accurate Vehicle with 4-wheel drive"), although not all models come equipped with the four-wheel drive system.

For the third-generation model, Toyota offered both short- and long-wheelbase versions of the RAV4. Short-wheelbase versions were sold in Japan and Europe; long-wheelbase versions in Australia and North America. Toyota of Japan also sold the longer-wheelbase version as the Toyota Vanguard (Japanese: トヨタ・ヴァンガード, Hepburn: Toyota Vangādo) at Toyopet Store dealership chain from 2005 through 2016. RAV4s for the Japanese market were sold at two different Toyota dealership chains, Corolla Store and Netz.

== First generation (XA10; 1994) ==
First generation
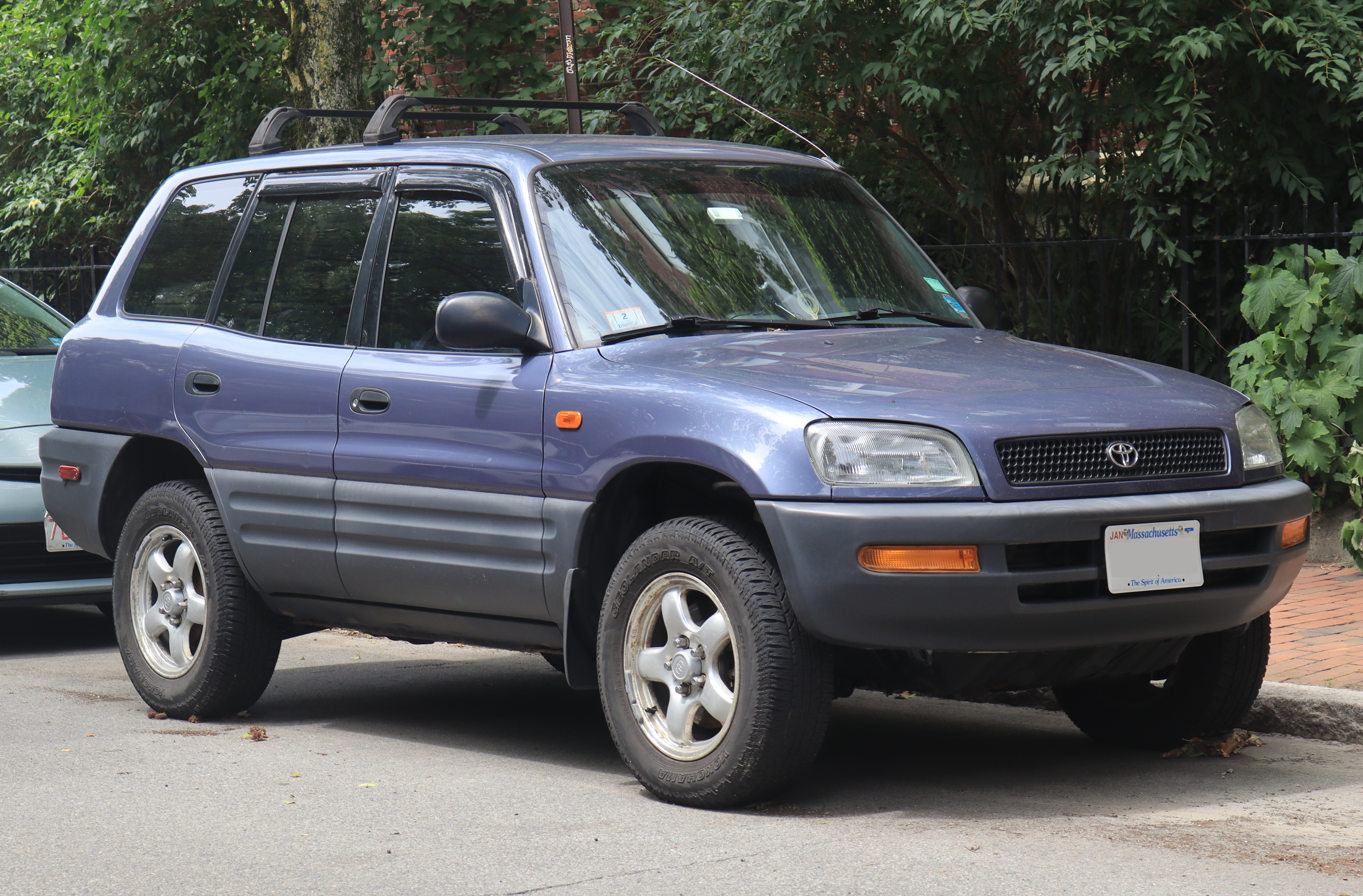
- Pre-facelift Toyota RAV4 5-door

Overview
- Model code: XA10
- Also called: Guangtong GTQ6440 (China, JV); Toyota Funcruiser RAV4 (Netherlands)
- Production: May 1994 – May 2000 (RAV4); 1997–2003 (RAV4 EV)
- Model years: 1996–2000
- Assembly: Japan: Toyota, Aichi (Motomachi plant; April 1994 – July 2000); Tahara, Aichi (Tahara plant; commenced January 1996); China: Zhuhai, Guangdong
- Designer: Hideo Kondo (exterior 3-door/5-door: 1991, 1993); Okawa Isao (interior: 1991, 1993); Seiichiro Kitabashi (colours and materials: 1990–1993)

Body and chassis
- Body style: 3-door SUV (hardtop); 5-door SUV; 3-door convertible SUV (softtop)

Powertrain
- Engine: Petrol: 2.0 L 3S-FE I4; 2.0 L 3S-GE I4
- Electric motor: 50 kW (67 hp), 190 N⋅m (140 ft⋅lb) (electric)
- Transmission: 5-speed manual; 4-speed automatic

Dimensions
- Wheelbase: 5-door: 2,410 mm (94.9 in); 3-door: 2,200 mm (86.6 in)
- Length: 5-door: 4,150–4,160 mm (163.4–163.8 in); 3-door: 3,740–3,750 mm (147.2–147.6 in)
- Width: 1,695 mm (66.7 in)
- Height: 3-door: 1,646–1,661 mm (64.8–65.4 in); 5-door: 1,650 mm (65.0 in)

The first-generation RAV4, known as the XA10 series, was constructed on a unique platform that shared Carina and Corolla elements. It launched in Japan in May 1994. Design and development commenced in 1989 under code-name 153T, with design approval and start of production development in the second half of 1991 on the 3-door version and in 1993 for the 5-door version. In March 1995, the 5-door was launched and introduced to the US in January 1996, with standard dual airbags.

The XA10 series was available in both three and five door versions. In the US, a 2.0-litre straight-four producing 89 kW (121 PS; 119 hp) was available. Both front-wheel drive and four-wheel drive were available, and the RAV4 could be had with either a five-speed manual or four-speed automatic transmission. It was named the 1997 Automobile of the Year by Automobile Magazine. The 1996-1997 model years had headlamps with a bracket push in type, dual filament bulb. The front running/turn signal lamps used older round socket dual filament bulbs. The rear used round socket type bulbs as well.

In Japan, the 2.0-litre 3S-GE BEAMS engine with 132 kW (179 PS; 177 hp) was also available. Some variants of the 1998 Toyota RAV4 were labeled as SXA11 rather than XA10, paired with an owner-given name of "RAV 4.1".

The 1996 RAV4 was rated for between 21 and 23 miles per gallon (4.2 to 4.8 gals per 100 miles) of combined city/highway driving.

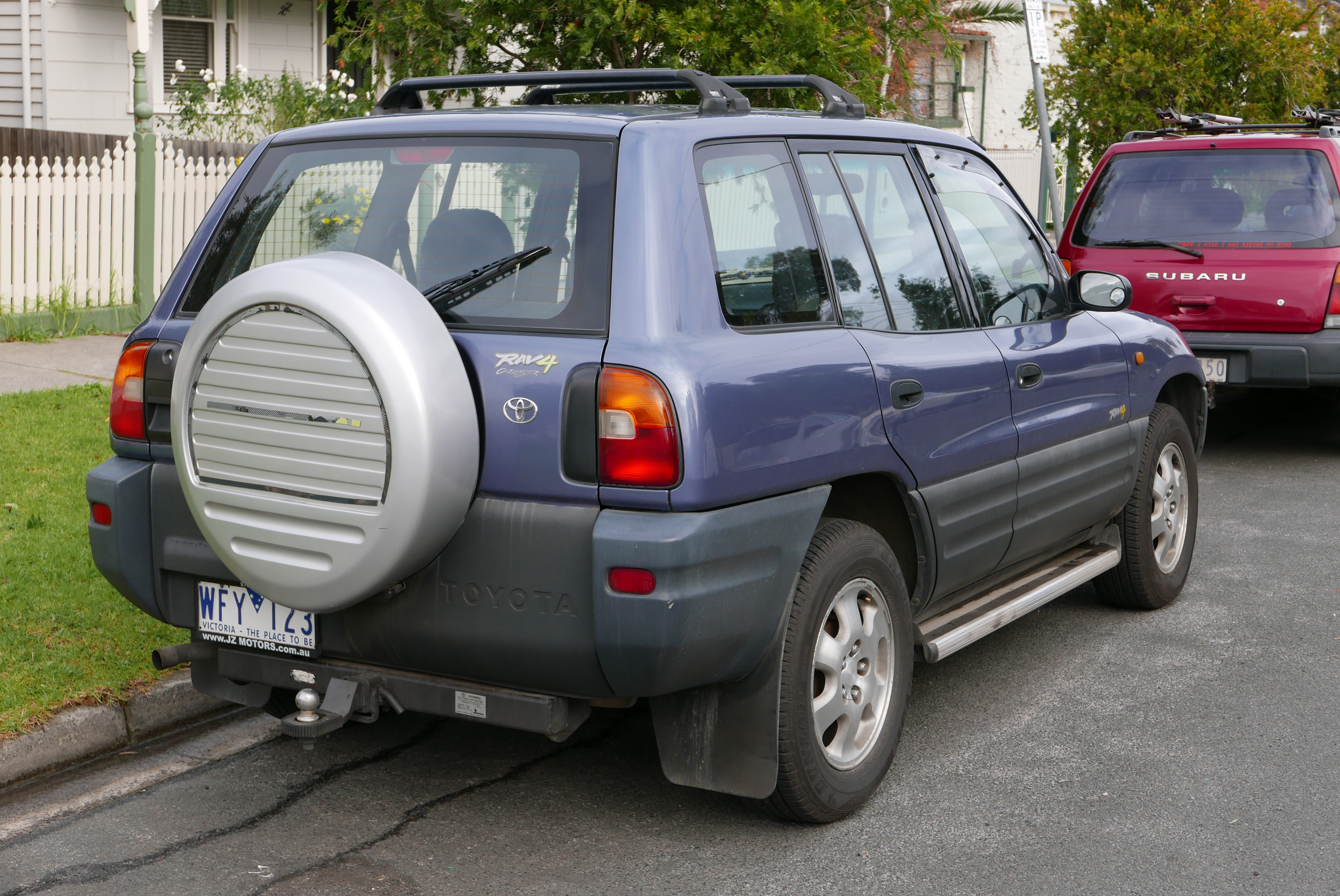
Pre-facelift Toyota RAV4 5-door

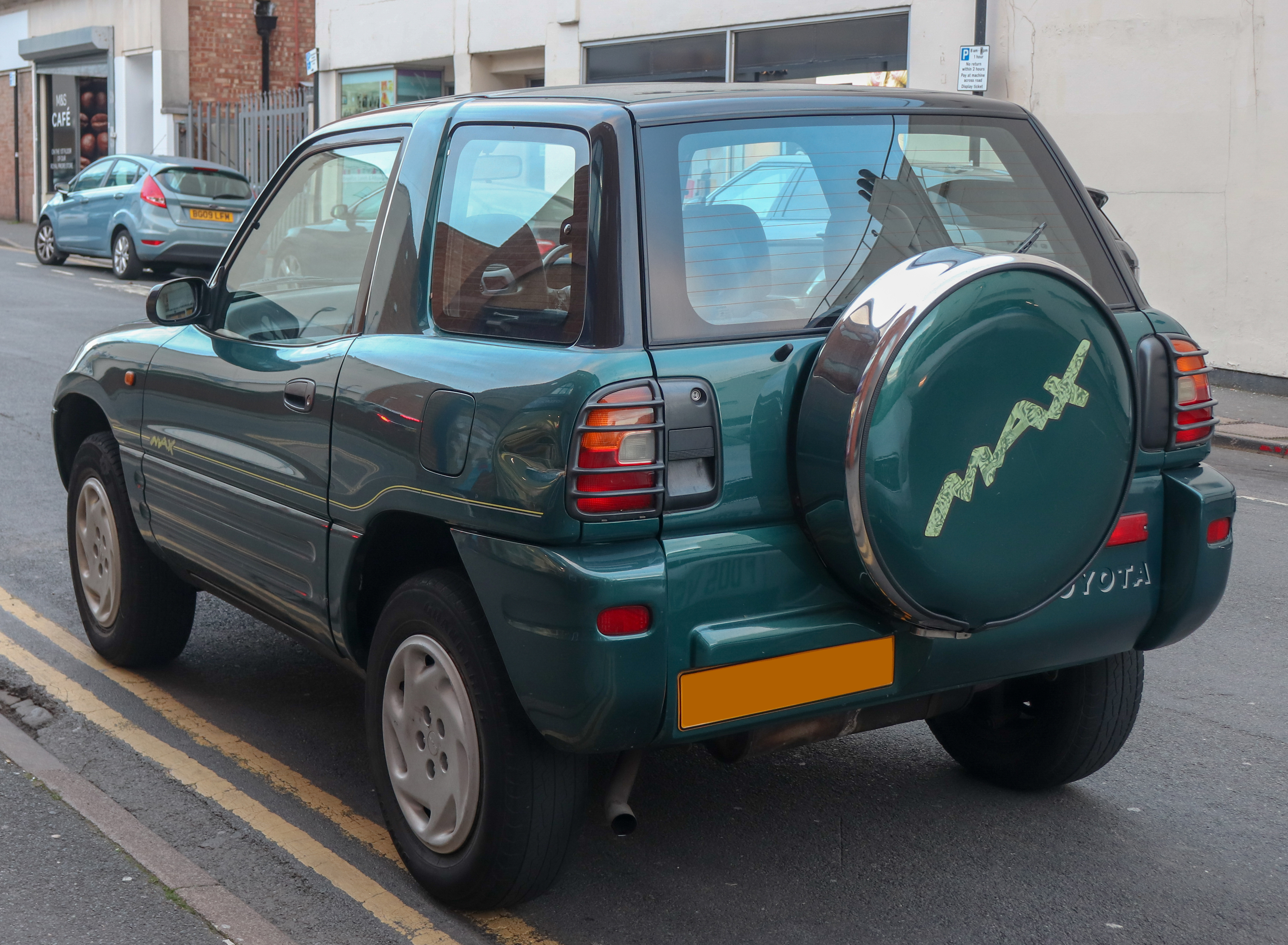
Pre-facelift Toyota RAV4 hard-top

=== RAV4 EV ===
The RAV4 EV is a plug-in, all-electric variant of the RAV4. Produced from 1997 to 2003 for fleet lease, this "zero emission" model was only offered for public sale for seven months in 2002, in very small quantities in California. Powered by an advanced Nickel-metal hydride (NiMH) battery pack capable of storing 27 kWh, the RAV4 EV can go up to 193 km (120 miles) between charges, and came with a 97,000 km (60,000-mile) battery warranty. A total of 1,484 units were leased and/or sold in California, and as of mid-2012, almost 500 units were still in use.

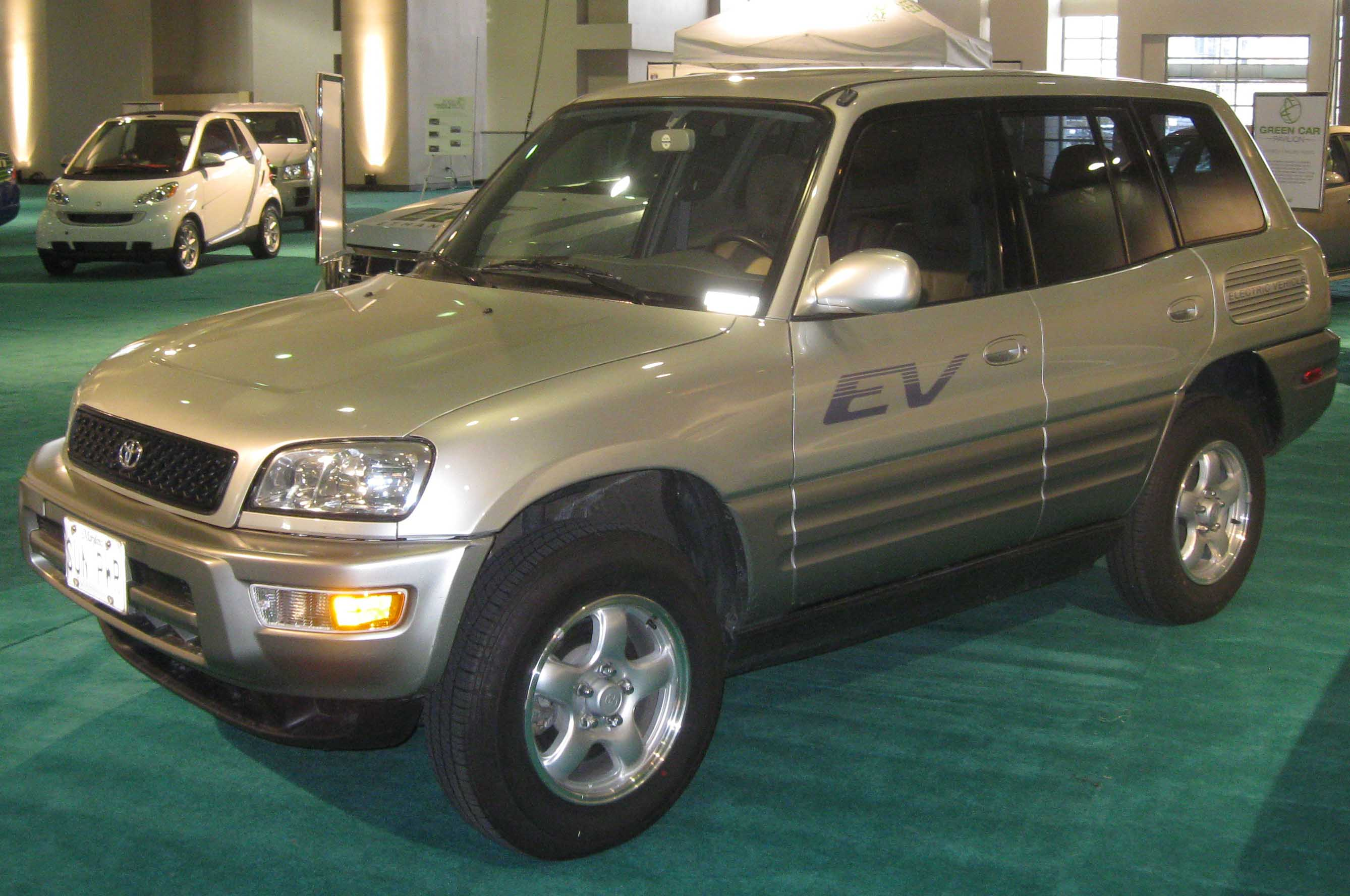
RAV4 EV (front)

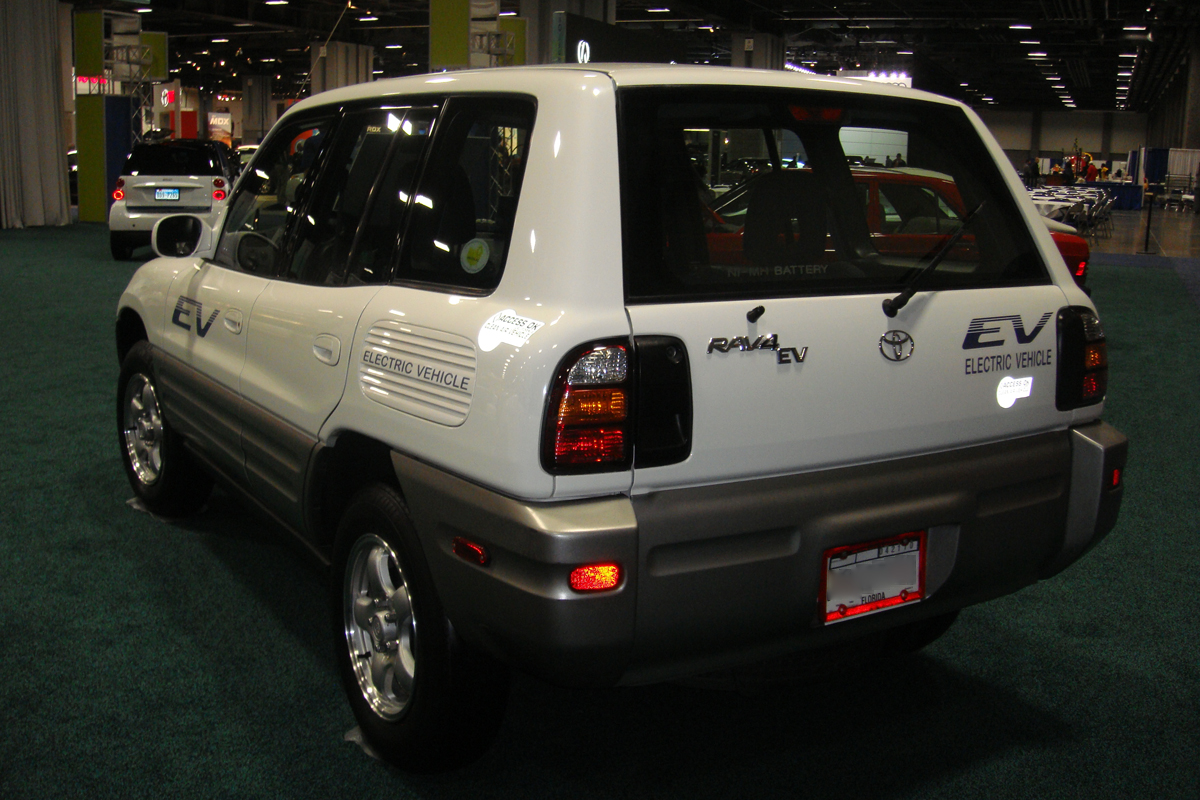
RAV4 EV (rear)

=== Facelift (1997) ===
In 1997 (for the 1998 model year), the RAV4 was slightly restyled on the front and rear fascias, and a soft top three-door was made available. Power was increased slightly to 95 kW (129 PS; 127 hp). In June 1999, the two-door hardtop was dropped from the American lineup, leaving the five-door and soft top models. The 1998–2000 models used a single filament headlamp, with two different beams per housing (low and high beam) opposed to the original single beam with dual filaments. The rear lamps use the more modern rectangular style bulbs (7440/7443). The interior has subtle changes such as different coloured seats, restyled steering wheel, different coloured door panels, extra cup holders on certain models (cigarette lighter/cup holder duo), and a digital odometer.

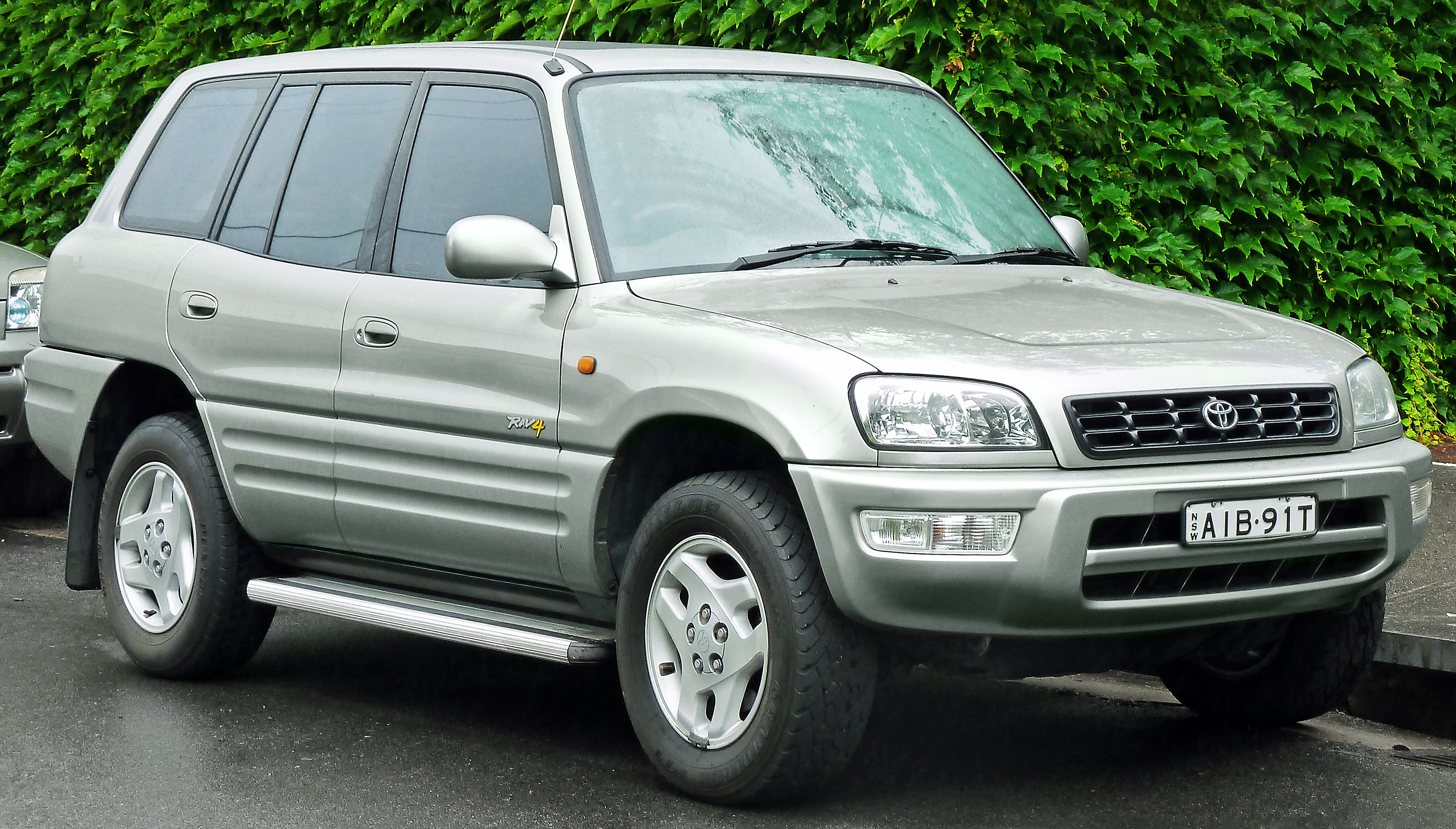
Facelift RAV4 Cruiser 5-door

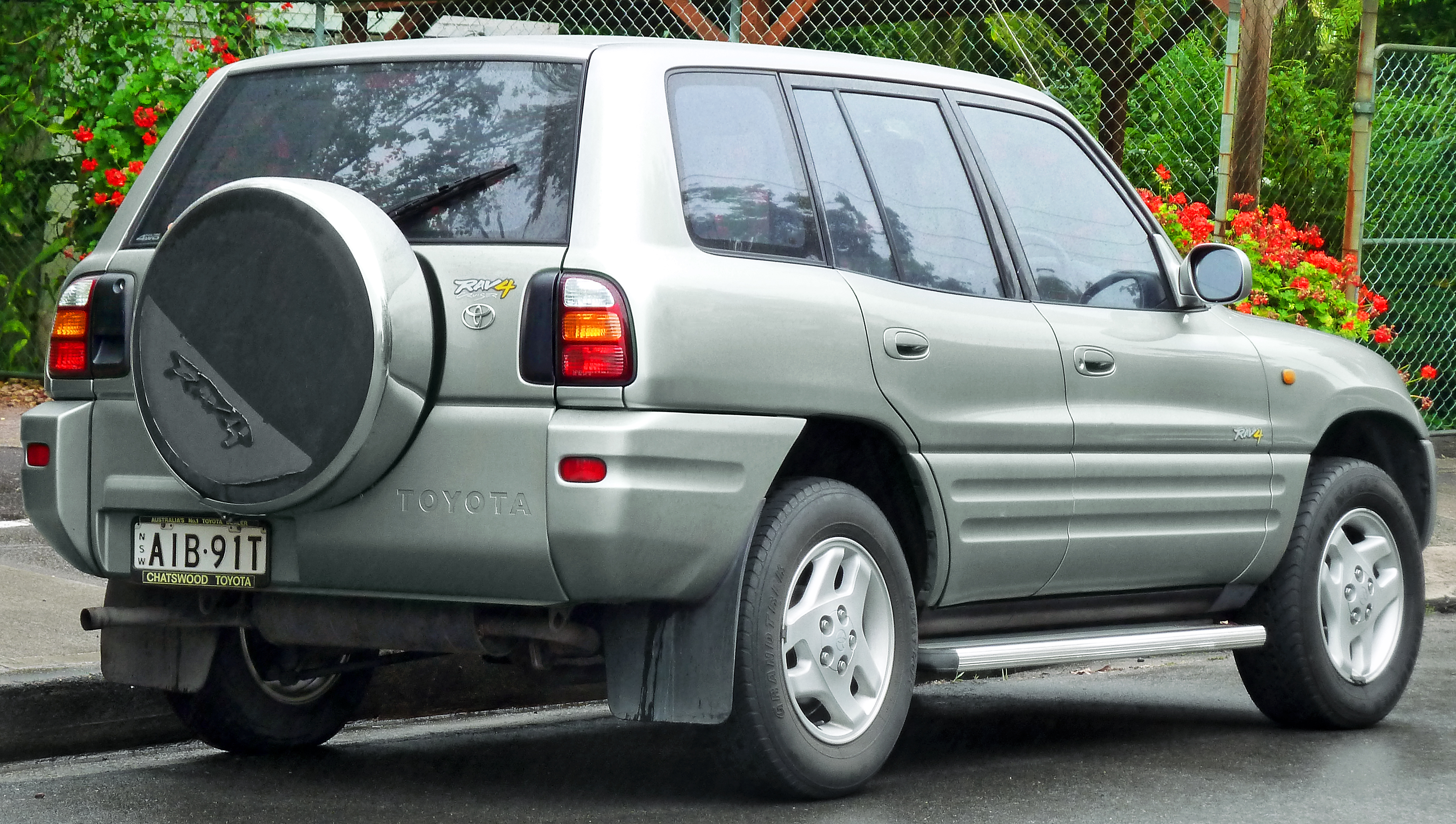
Facelift RAV4 Cruiser 5-door

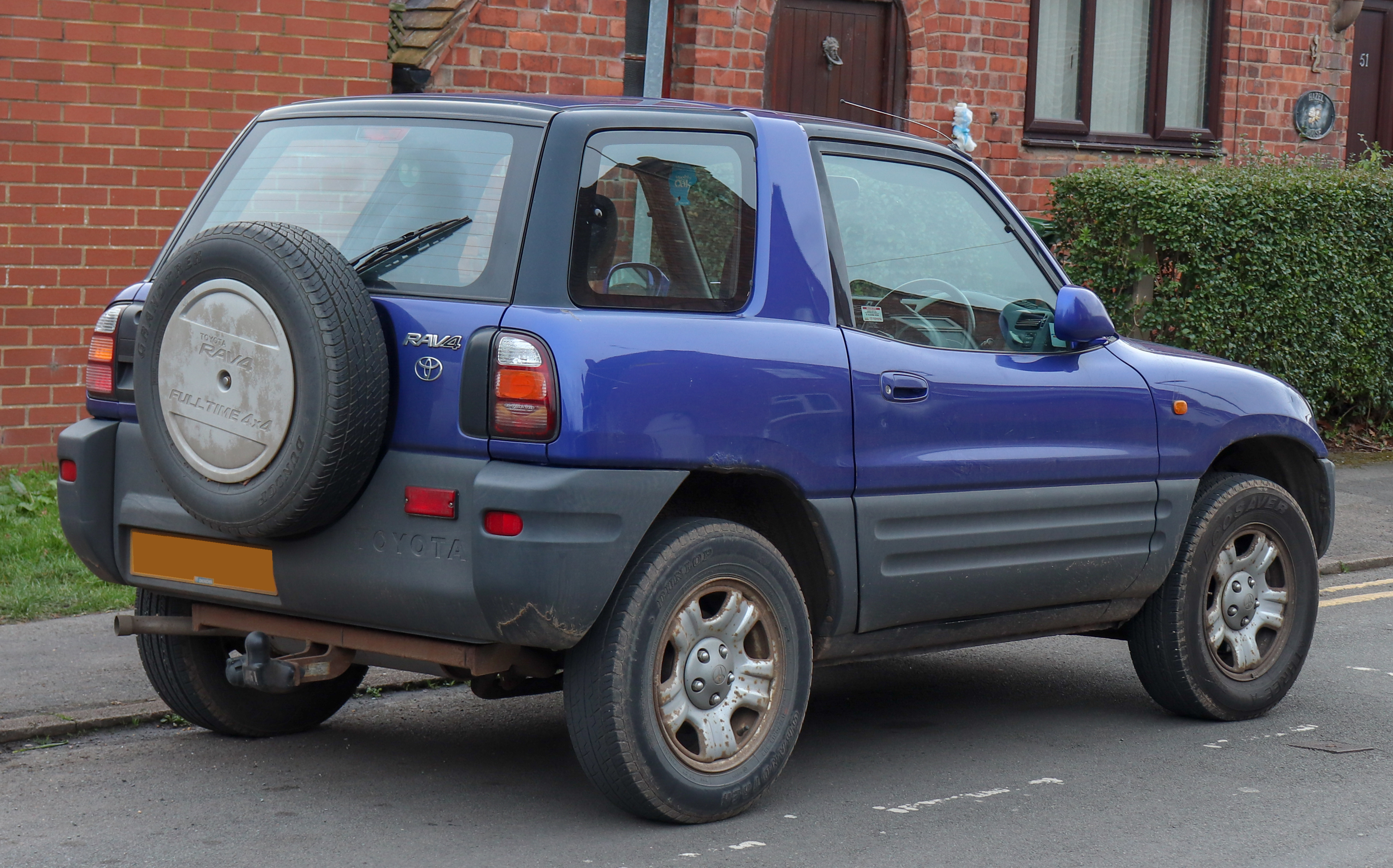
Facelift RAV4 3-door hardtop

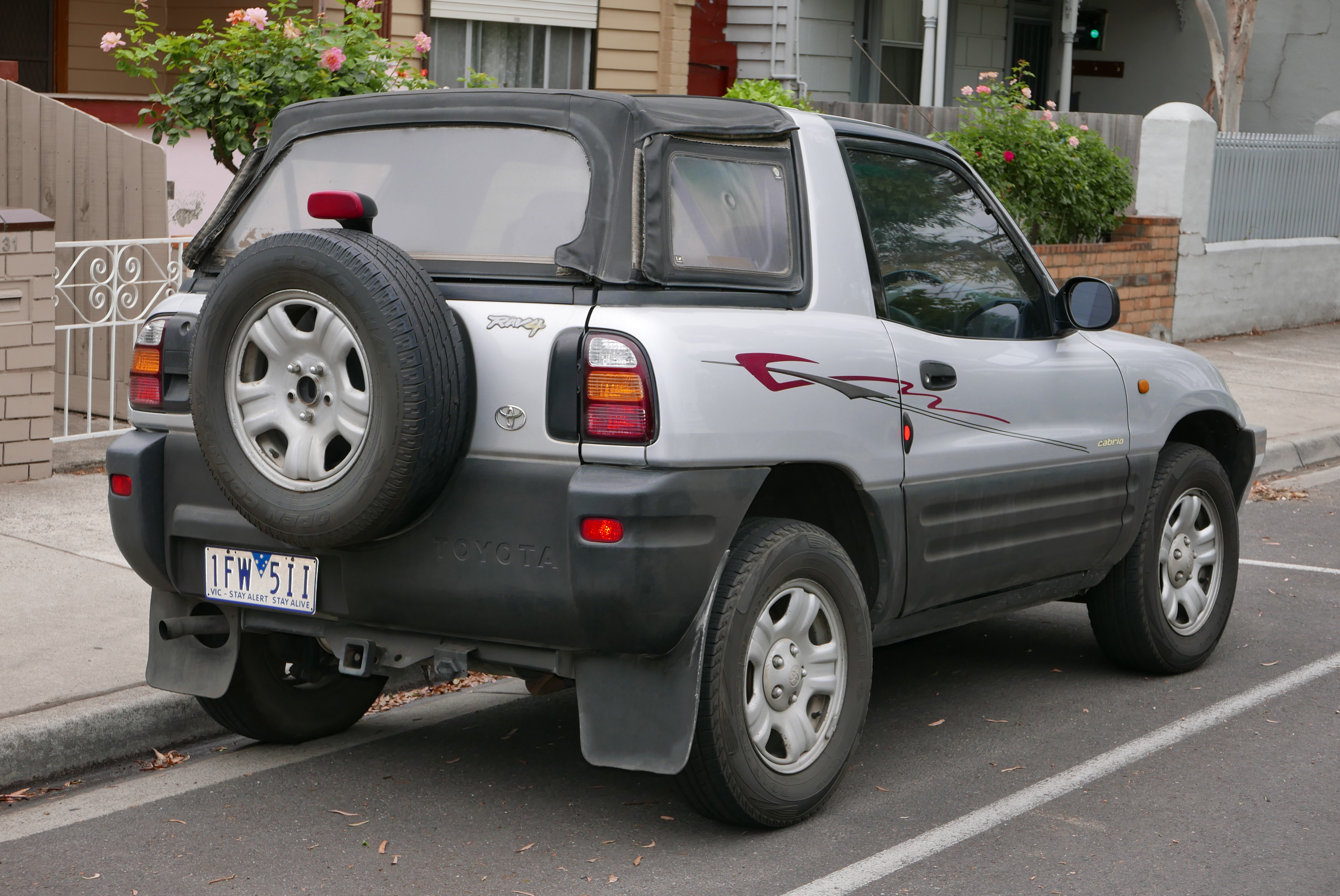
Facelift RAV4 3-door softtop

=== Safety ===
IIHS scores (1996 model year)
| Moderate overlap front (original test) | Marginal |

== Second generation (XA20; 2000) ==
Second generation
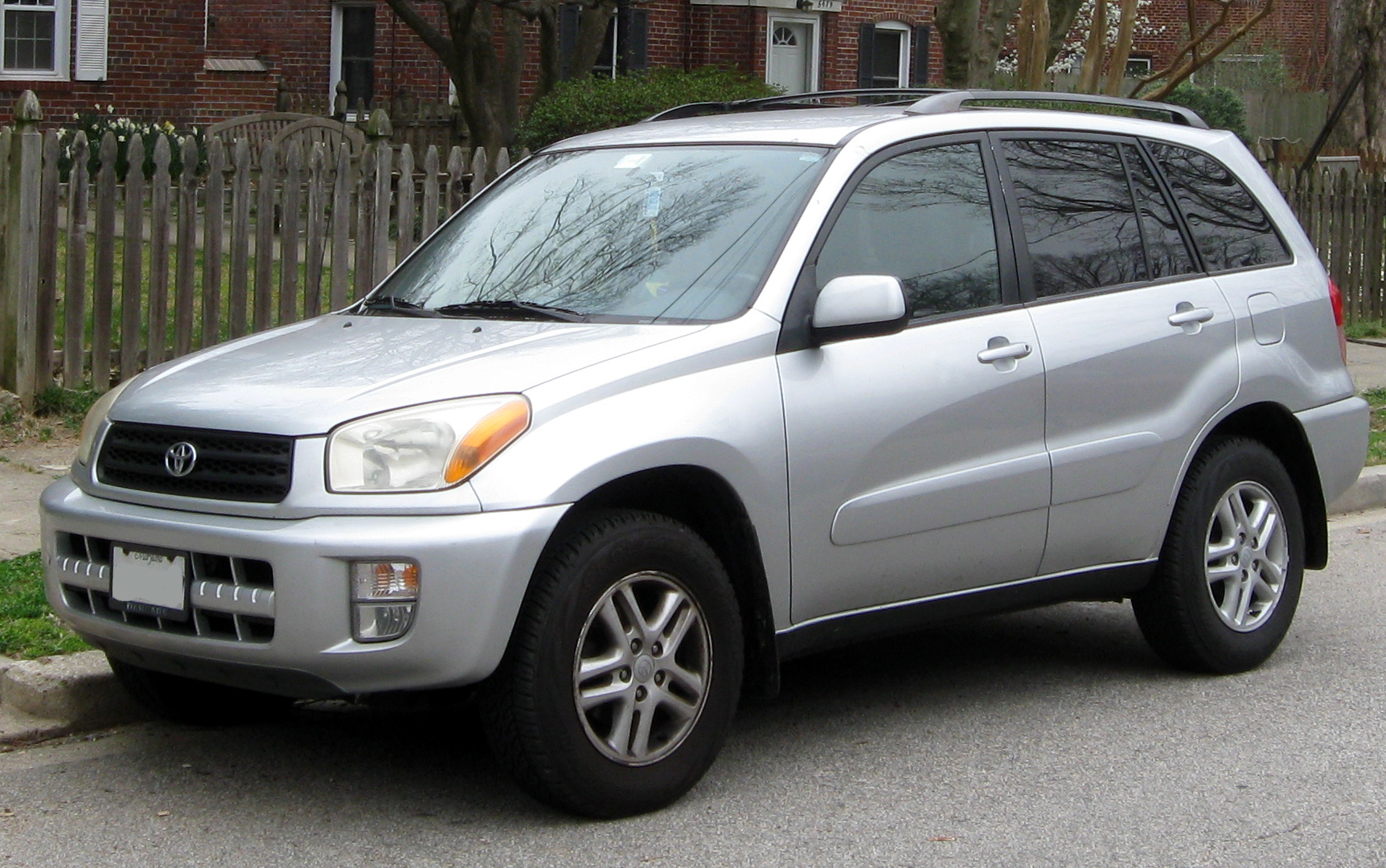
- Pre-facelift Toyota RAV4 L (US)

Overview
- Model code: XA20
- Production: May 2000 – November 2005
- Model years: 2001–2005
- Assembly: Japan: Tahara, Aichi (Tahara plant); Ōbu, Aichi (Nagakusa plant)
- Designer: Kevin Hunter (5-door: 1997); Yasuhide Hosoda (3/5-door: 1997)

Body and chassis
- Body style: 3-door SUV; 5-door SUV
- Platform: Toyota MC platform

Powertrain
- Engine: Petrol: 1.8 L 1ZZ-FE VVT-i I4; 2.0 L 1AZ-FE VVT-i I4; 2.4 L 2AZ-FE VVT-i I4; Diesel: 2.0 L 1CD-FTV D-4D I4-T
- Transmission: 5-speed manual; 4-speed automatic

Dimensions
- Wheelbase: 5-door: 2,490 mm (98.0 in); 3-door: 2,280 mm (89.8 in)
- Length: 5-door: 4,193–4,230 mm (165.1–166.5 in); 3-door: 3,860 mm (152.0 in)
- Width: 1,735 mm (68.3 in)
- Height: 1,650–1,680 mm (65.0–66.1 in)
- Curb weight: 1,150–1,445 kg (2,535–3,186 lb)

The second-generation RAV4, known as the XA20 series, went on sale in July 2000. Like the previous model, the XA20 was available in three- and five-door configurations and was constructed on a platform that shared Carina and Corolla elements. Development began in 1995, with a design freeze in the first half of 1998. Styling was done at Calty Design Research Incorporated (also simply known as Calty) by Yasuhide Hosoda and Kevin Hunter from 1996 to 1997.

The second-generation RAV4 was originally offered in a number of trim levels in the UK: NV was front-wheel drive, while NRG, GX, and VX were permanent four-wheel drive with differing levels of equipment. Although the RAV4 was available as a three-door in Europe, Asia and Australia, the American model was only available in a five-door configuration. A 1.8-litre inline-four engine (only with 2WD) producing 92 kW (125 PS; 123 hp), 2.0-litre inline-four engine producing 110 kW (150 PS; 148 hp), 2.4-litre inline-four engine producing 118 kW (160 PS; 158 hp), and a D-4D diesel engine were available.

In Australia, the RAV4 came in base Edge and upmarket Cruiser models in both three- and five-door configurations. All models came equipped with a brand-new 2.0-litre four-cylinder engine featuring VVT (variable valve timing), resulting in improved power and torque, as well as fuel consumption. Permanent four-wheel drive was featured. The second generation RAV4 enjoyed success in Australia, where it became the best-selling SUV in the country in 2001, overtaking its rival the Honda CR-V for the first time.

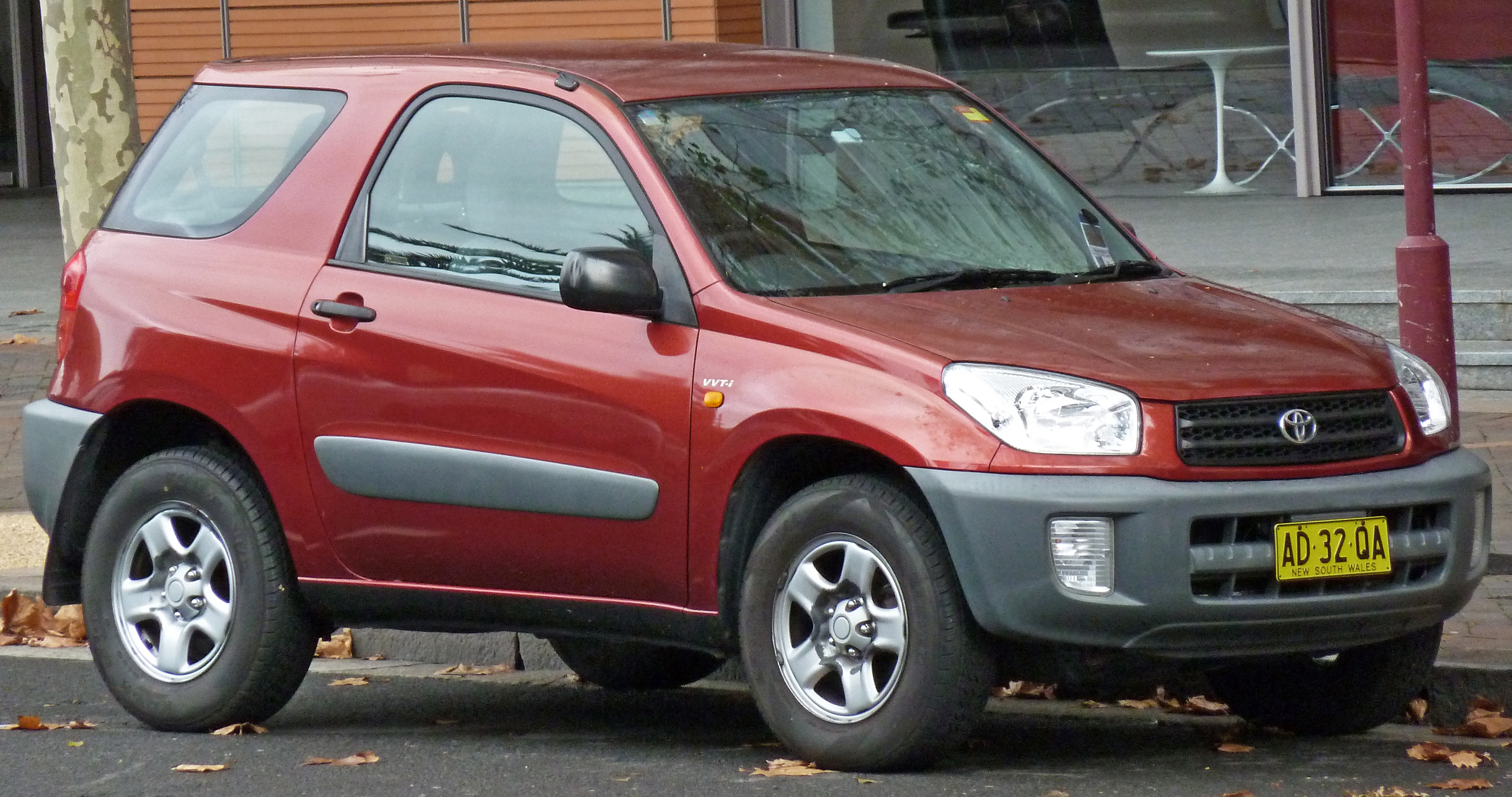
Pre-facelift Toyota RAV4 Edge 3-door (ACA20R, Australia)

Pre-facelift Toyota RAV4 Edge 5-door (ACA21R, Australia)

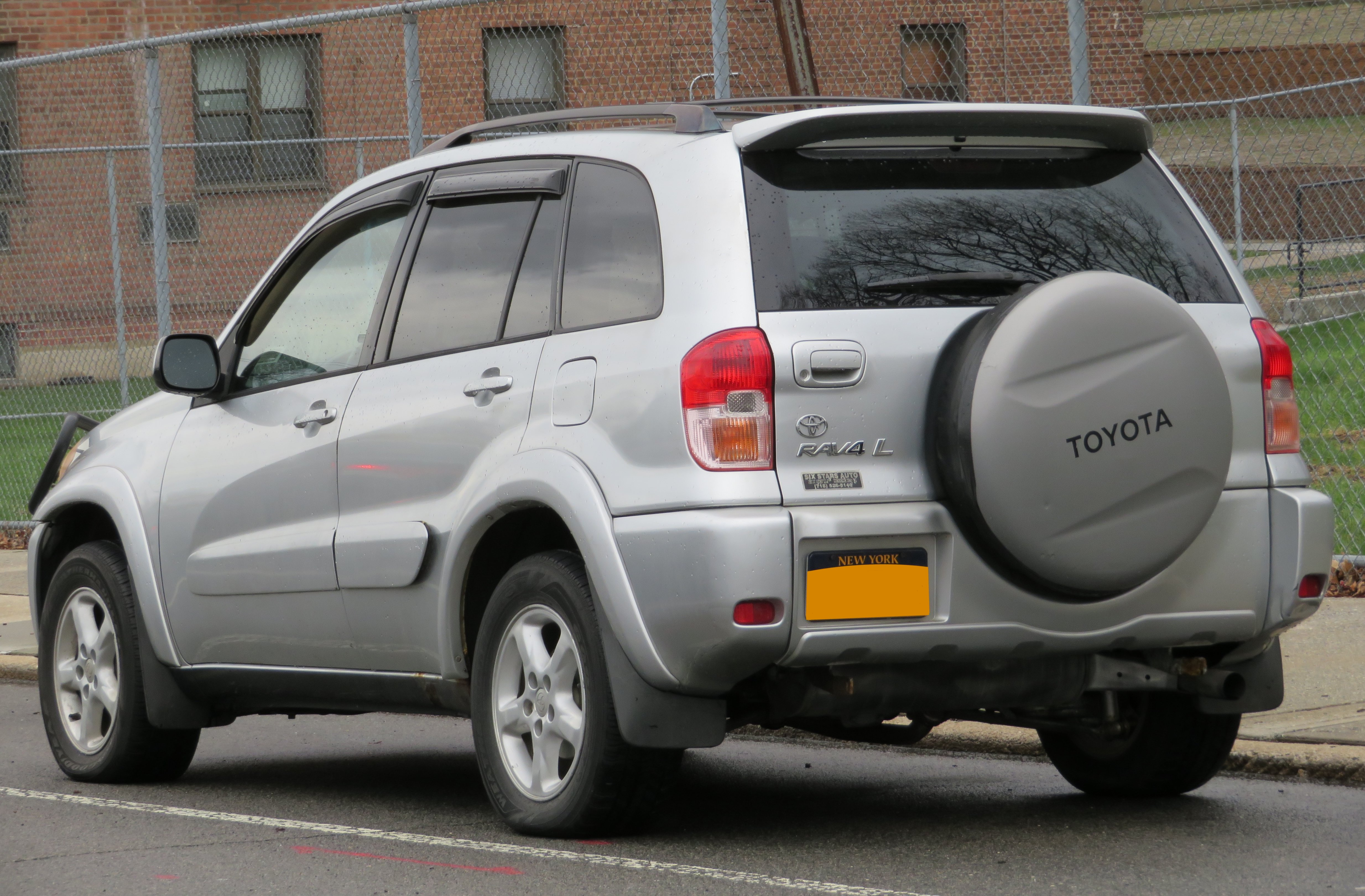
Pre-facelift Toyota RAV4 L 5-door (US)

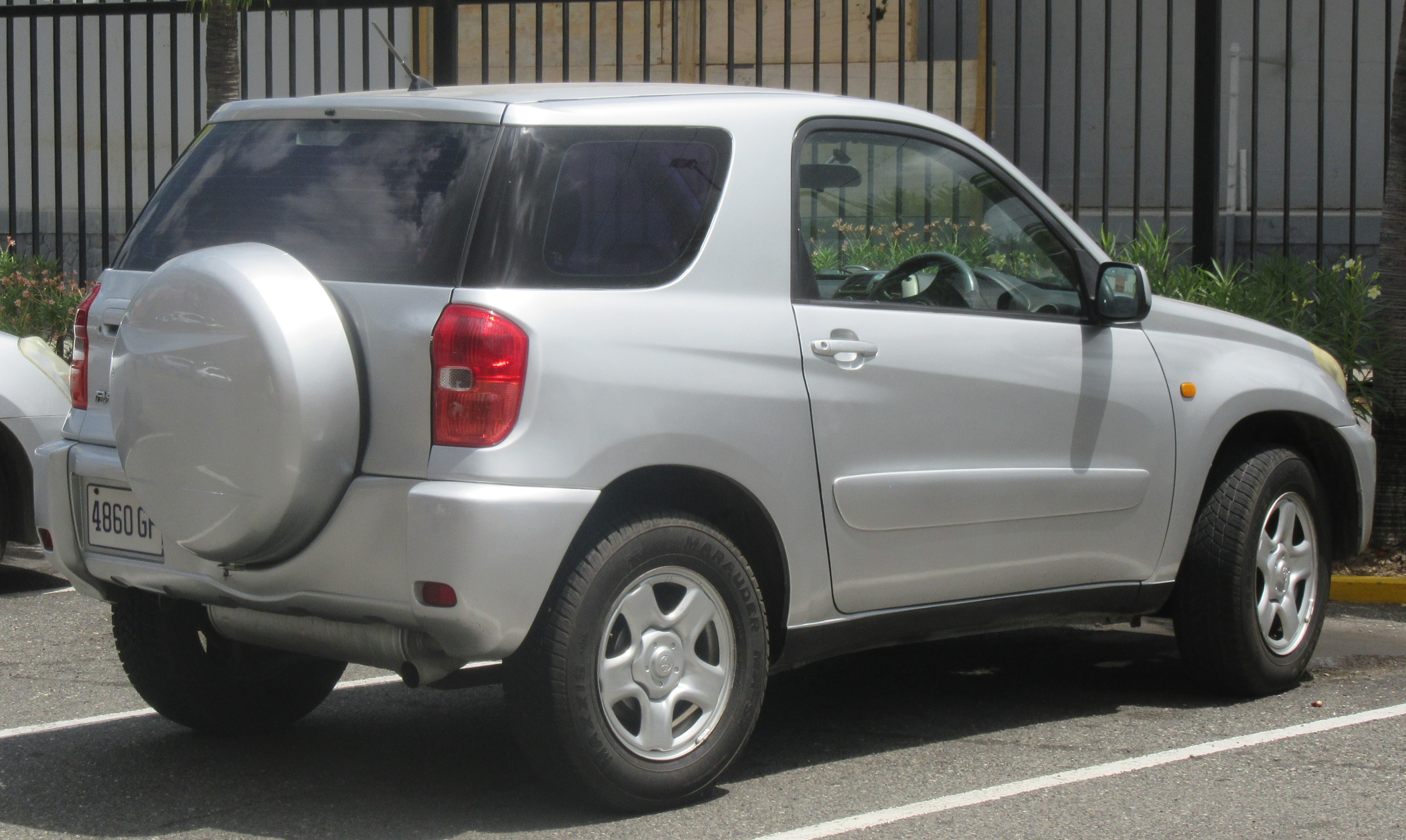
Pre-facelift Toyota RAV4 3-door

=== Facelift (2003) ===
In late 2003 (for the 2004 model year), the RAV4 was given a styling update redesigned interior, improved equipment, and, in certain markets, a new engine. In the United States the safety structure was improved and Vehicle Stability Control made standard. Side airbags also began to be offered as an optional add-on. The RAV4's 2.0-litre engine was upgraded with a new 2.4-litre 2AZ-FE engine in the US and Australia producing 120 kW (163 PS; 161 hp) and 220 N⋅m (162 lb⋅ft). Other countries mainly received 5-door models with the 2.0-litre VVT-i engine. Automatic electric air conditioning also became available, as well as an electric throttle. In addition, European models received a new catalytic converter due to a new European emission policy for that year.

In Australia, for the facelift, the base Edge was renamed CV, and gained standard air conditioning (previously an option). The CV also received painted bumpers, which came in either silver or body-coloured shades, depending on the body colour. In addition, the model range was given a subtle facelift, consisting largely of a new front bumper with circular fog lights and white turn signals instead of the older orange lights. In 2005, a new "CV Sport" model was added to the range in Australia, which included a non-functional bonnet scoop, giving the RAV4 a more aggressive appearance. The CV Sport model was short-lived, lasting only a year, and was introduced primarily to stimulate sales until the new model arrived in early 2006.

The second generation RAV4 had the highest proportion of female drivers among all makes and models in the United States, with the possible exception of the Volkswagen New Beetle, according to 2003–2004 registration and survey data.

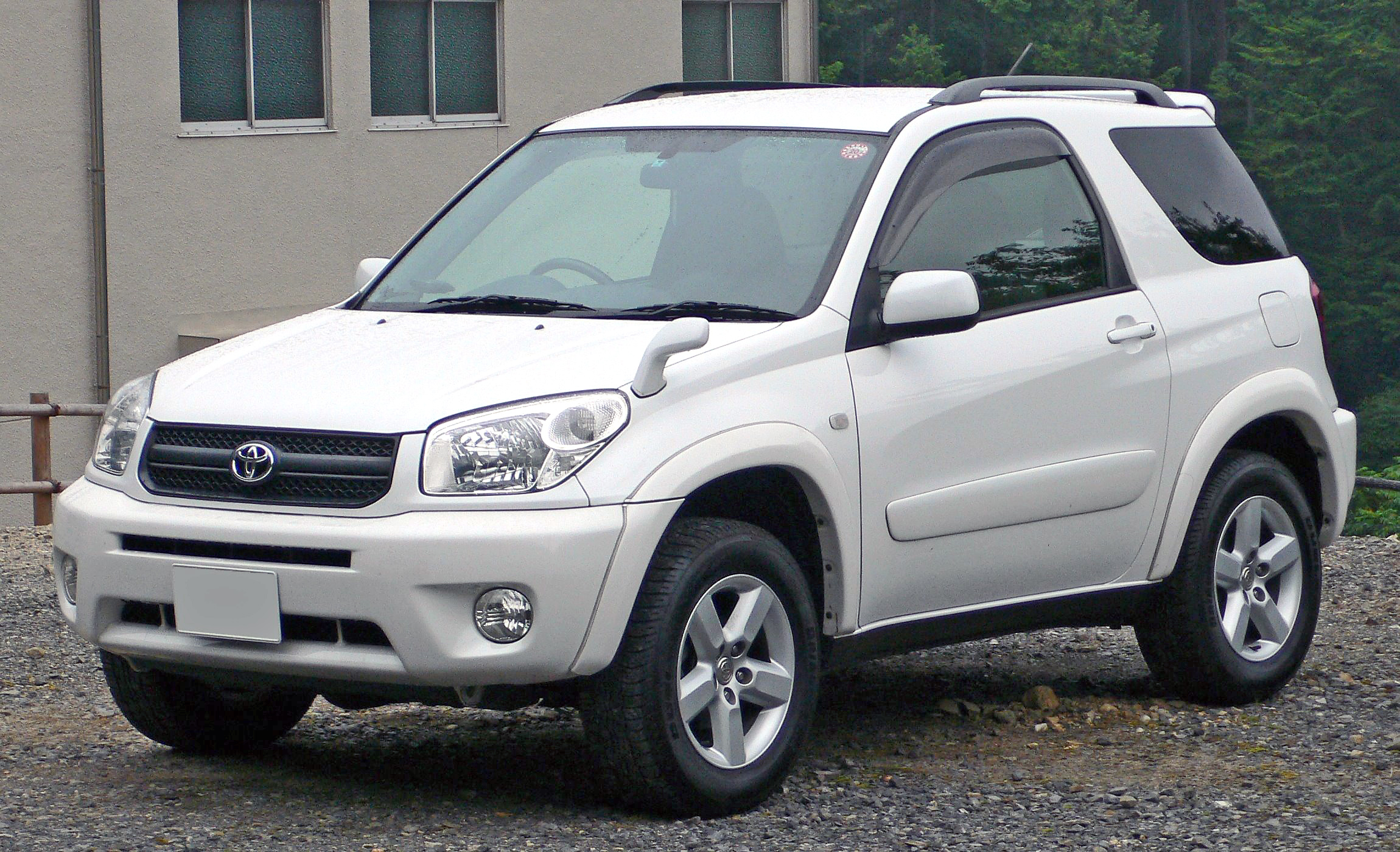
Facelift RAV4 3-door (front, Japan)

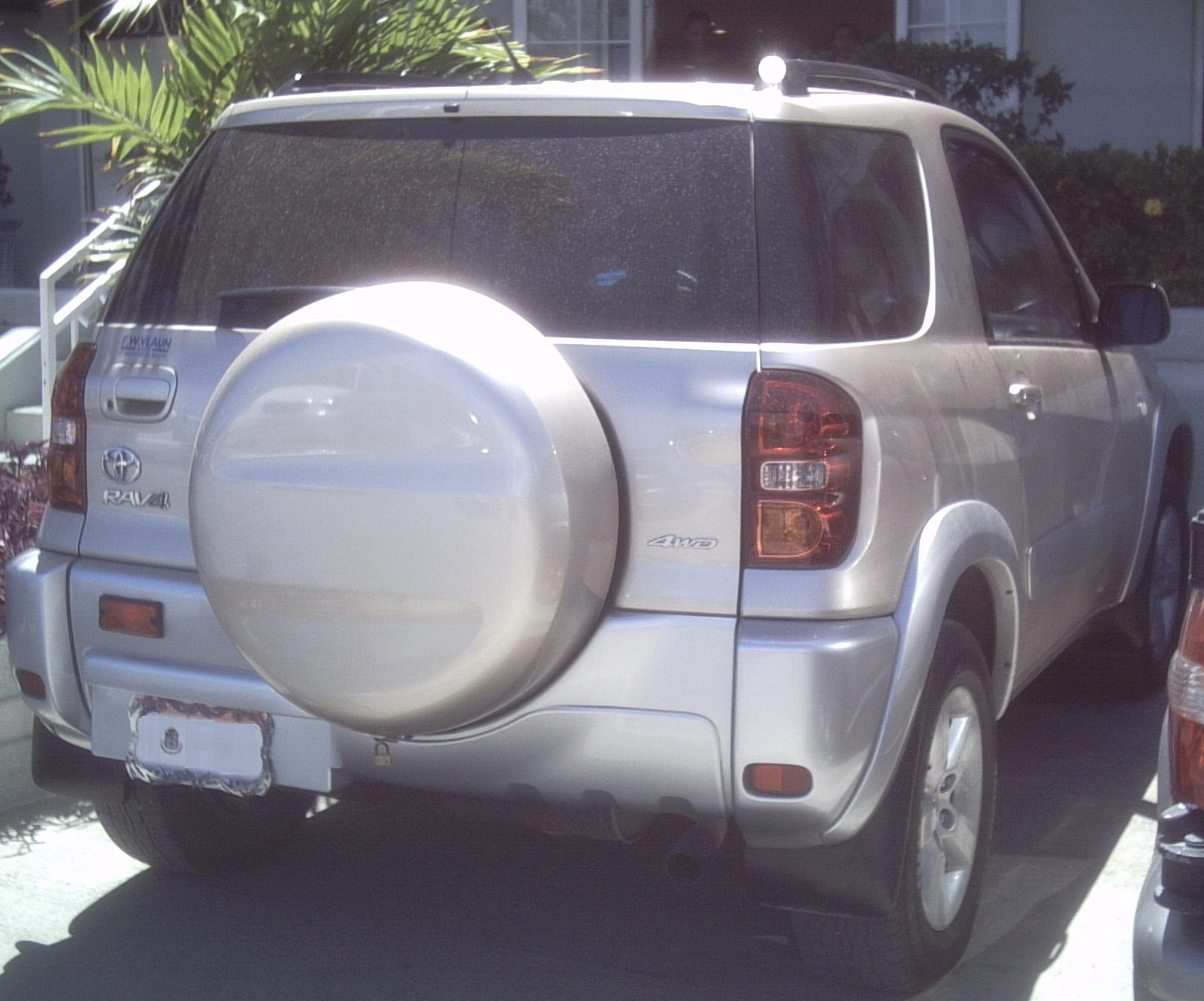
Facelift RAV4 3-door (rear)

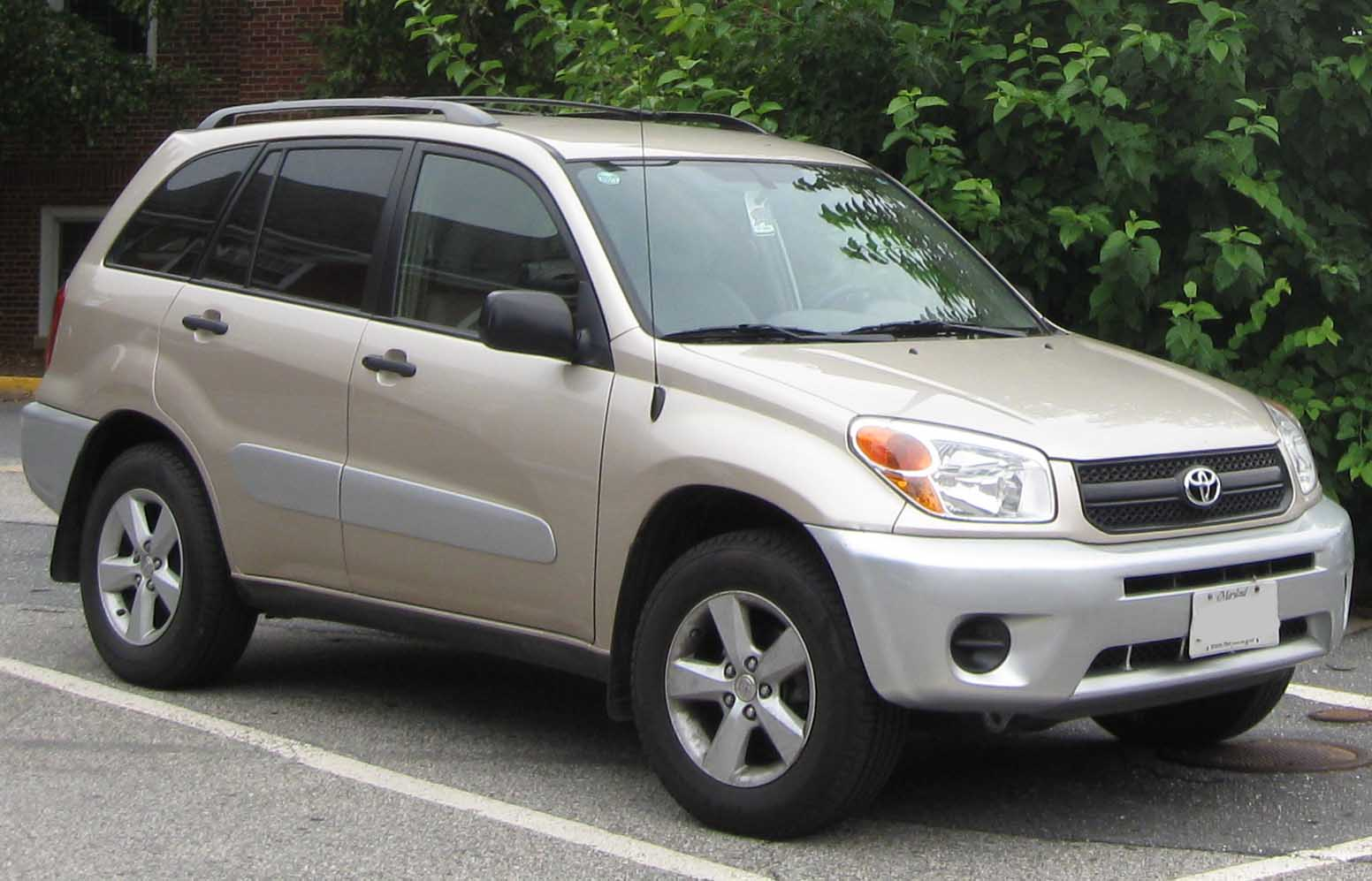
Facelift RAV4 5-door (front, US)

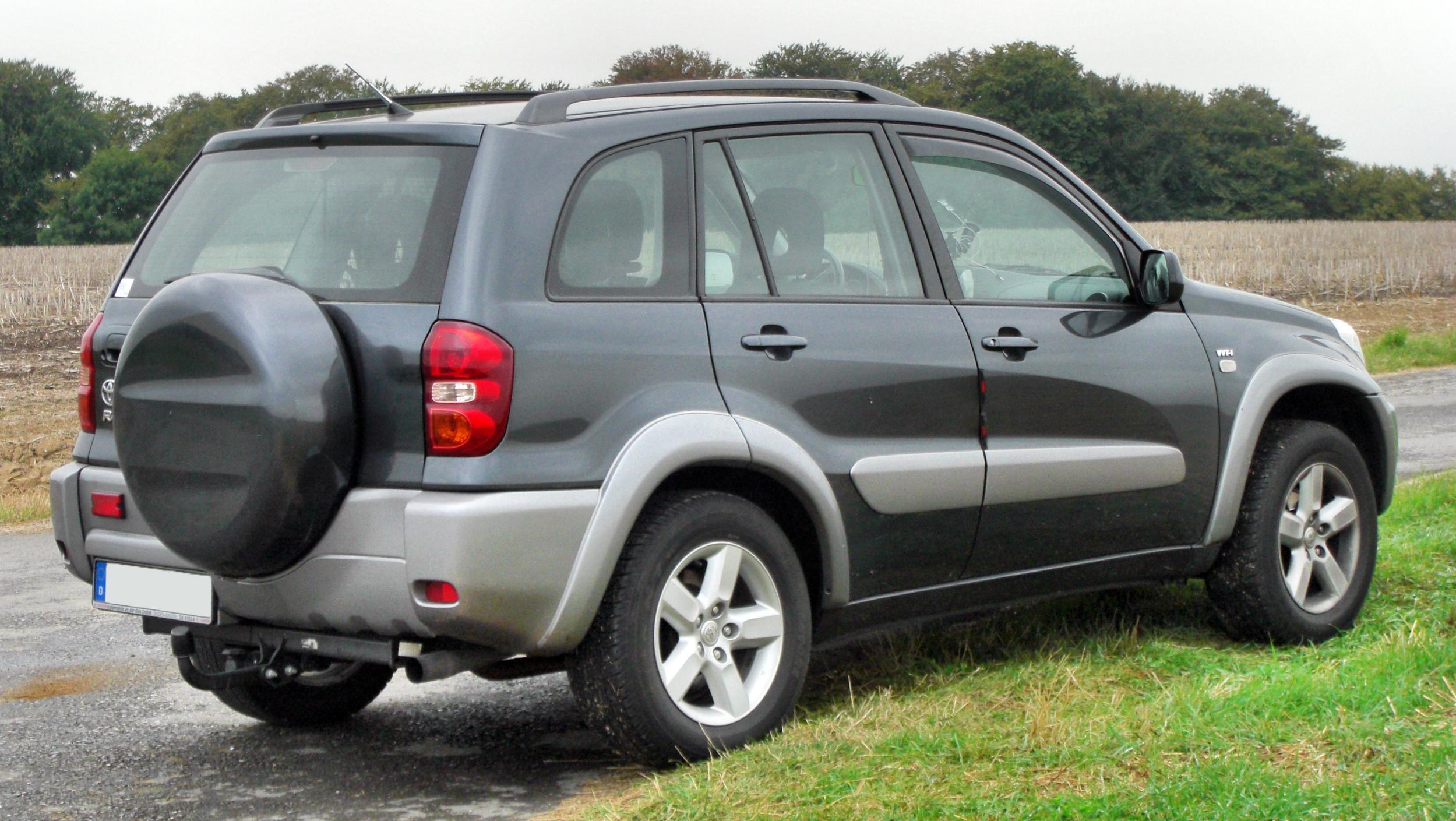
Facelift RAV4 5-door (rear, Europe)

=== Safety ===
IIHS scores (2001 model year)
| Moderate overlap front (original test) | Acceptable |
| Side impact (original test) | Poor |

IIHS scores (2004 model year)
| Moderate overlap front (original test) | Good |
| Side (original test w/ optional side airbags) | Good |
| Side (original test w/o optional side airbags) | Poor |
| Head restraints & seats | Marginal |

ANCAP test results* Toyota RAV4 variants with side curtain airbags (2000)
| Test | Score |
|---|---|
| Overall | 4 /5 stars |
| Frontal offset | 10.19/16 |
| Side impact | 14.92/16 |
| Pole | 2/2 |
| Seat belt reminders | 0/3 |
| Whiplash protection | Not Assessed |
| Pedestrian protection | Marginal |
| Electronic stability control | Optional |

ANCAP test results* Toyota RAV4 5 door hatch with dual frontal airbags (2002)
| Test | Score |
|---|---|
| Overall | 4 /5 stars |
| Frontal offset | 10.19/16 |
| Side impact | 14.92/16 |
| Pole | Not Assessed |
| Seat belt reminders | 0/3 |
| Whiplash protection | Not Assessed |
| Pedestrian protection | Marginal |
| Electronic stability control | Optional |

== Third generation (XA30; 2005) ==
Third generation
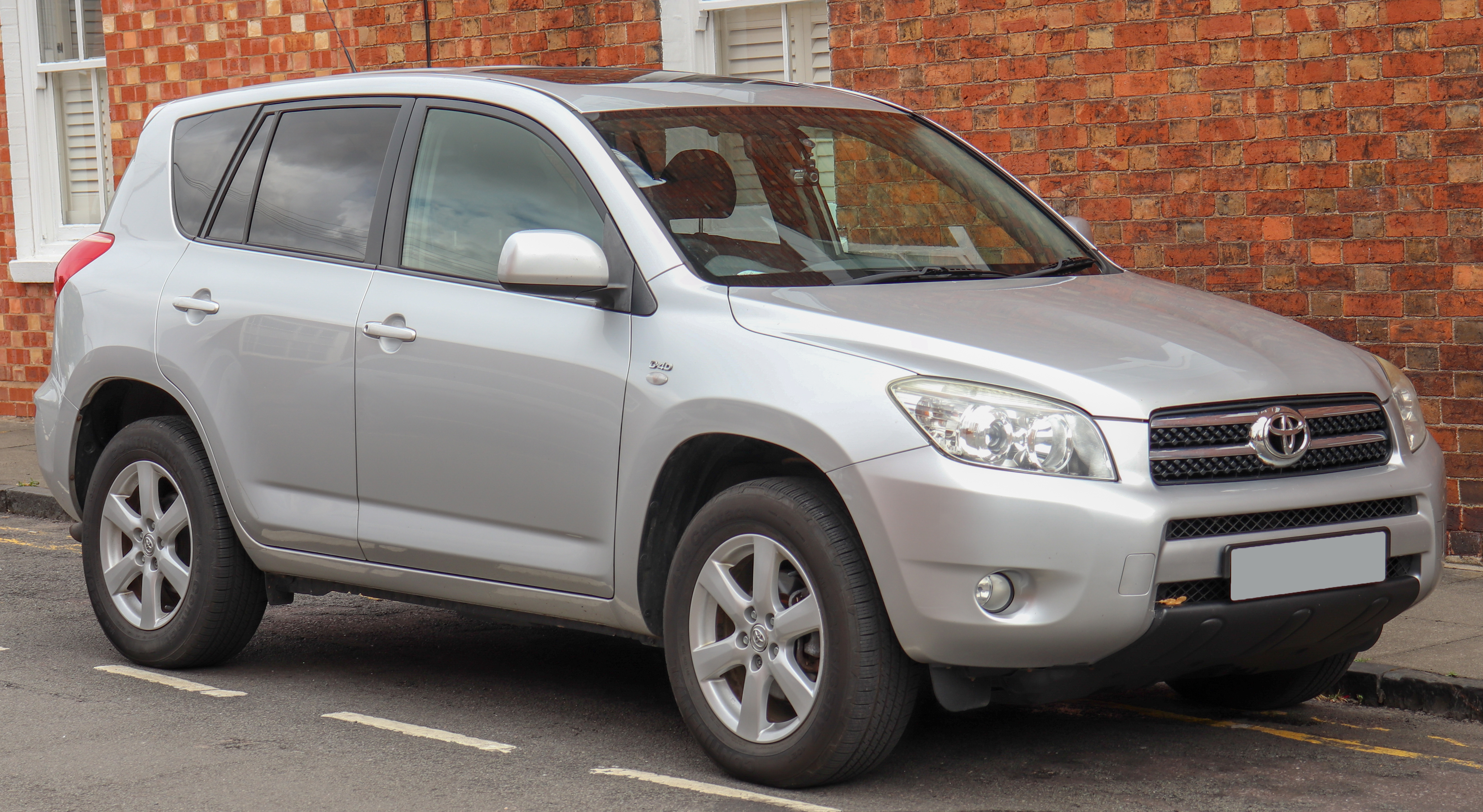
- Pre-facelift Toyota RAV4 SWB

Overview
- Model code: XA30
- Also called: Toyota Vanguard (Japan, August 2007 - 2013 LWB)
- Production: November 2005 – December 2012 (export); November 2005 – May 2016 (Japan); September 2012 – September 2014 (RAV4 EV)
- Model years: 2006–2012 (export); 2006–2016 (Japan)
- Assembly: Japan: Tahara, Aichi (Tahara plant); Toyota, Aichi (Takaoka plant) (2014–2016, Japanese market); Ōbu, Aichi (Nagakusa plant); Canada: Woodstock, Ontario; China: Changchun, Jilin (FAW Toyota)
- Designer: Masaki Motozaki (exterior & interior: 2003)

Body and chassis
- Body style: 5-door SUV
- Platform: Toyota New MC platform

Powertrain
- Engine: Petrol: 2.0 L 1AZ-FE VVT-i I4; 2.0 L 1AZ-FSE VVT-i D-4 I4; 2.0 L 3ZR-FAE Valvematic I4; 2.4 L 2AZ-FE VVT-i I4; 2.5 L 2AR-FE VVT-i I4; 3.5 L 2GR-FE Dual VVT-i V6; Diesel: 2.2 L 2AD-FTV D-4D I4-T; 2.2 L 2AD-FHV D-CAT I4-T
- Transmission: 5/6-speed manual; 4/5/6-speed automatic; CVT-i

Dimensions
- Wheelbase: 2,560–2,660 mm (100.8–104.7 in)
- Length: 4,395–4,620 mm (173.0–181.9 in)
- Width: 1,815–1,855 mm (71.5–73.0 in)
- Height: 1,685–1,755 mm (66.3–69.1 in)
- Curb weight: 1,470–1,520 kg (3,241–3,351 lb)

Chronology
- Predecessor: Toyota Kluger (XU20) (for Toyota Vanguard; Japan, LWB)
- Successor: Toyota Harrier (XU60) (Vanguard)

The Toyota RAV4 was redesigned for the 2006 model year, using an all-new platform, and was first unveiled at the 2005 Frankfurt Motor Show.

The third-generation RAV4 was offered in two versions: a short- or a long-wheelbase model. The short-wheelbase model was sold only in Japan, Europe and New Zealand (diesel only in NZ), with the long-wheelbase RAV4 sold in Australia, New Zealand and North America. In comparison with the previous generation model, the wheelbase of the short-wheelbase model was increased by 70 mm (2.8 in), while exterior dimensions are 145 mm (5.7 in) longer and 80 mm (3.1 in) wider than the previous model. The extended-length version has an additional 21% in interior volume from the last generation, and had an optional third-row for two additional passengers (North America and Japan only). From 2007, the extended-length RAV4 was also sold alongside its shorter counterpart in Japan as the Toyota Vanguard, which uses a revised front-end body work incorporating a revised grille, bumper, bonnet and headlamps.

The third-generation RAV4 went on sale in Japan in 2005 at Netz dealers. As the XA30 series RAV4 was not available with a 3-door option, the previous generation 3-door RAV4 was dropped in the beginning of 2007. The XA30 series RAV4 was sold in Japan until July 2016, where the XA40 was not to be offered. Toyota discontinued the Vanguard in November 2013 in favour of the redesigned XU60 Harrier.

For this generation, the RAV4 could be optioned with either front-wheel drive or four-wheel drive in North America and Japan; while most countries only sold the four-wheel drive version. In the Japanese market four-wheel drive RAV4, between 97 and 98 percent of power is typically distributed to the front wheels, until it senses a loss of traction then up to 45 percent of power will go the rear wheels. The European market model is able to be locked into a 50:50 ratio.

The third-generation RAV4 is also equipped with electric power steering (EPS) system, an optional keyless entry system marketed as Smart Entry and Start System and nine airbags for the first time. In the interior, the RAV4 uses a two-tiered instrument panel which was designed to improve the feel of roominess. Higher trims offered an improved audio system, larger centre screen, and dual-zone climate controls.

Another addition for the third-generation RAV4 is the option of a V6 engine in some markets. It is a 3.5-litre 2GR-FE petrol engine that is rated at 201 kW (273 PS; 270 hp), which is capable of 0–60 mph (0–97 km/h) acceleration in around six seconds.

The vehicles were built in Toyota's Tahara, Aichi assembly plant, and under contract by Toyota Industries in its Nagakusa, Obu, Aichi plant. Beginning in November 2008, vehicles for the North American market were built in the Toyota Motor Manufacturing Canada Inc. at the new West Plant in Woodstock, Ontario. Beginning in March 2009, Chinese models began production by Tianjin FAW Toyota Motor Co. Ltd. in a joint-venture plant in Tianjin, China.

In 2015, the XA30 series RAV4 was awarded the WheelsTV pre-owned vehicle of the year title.

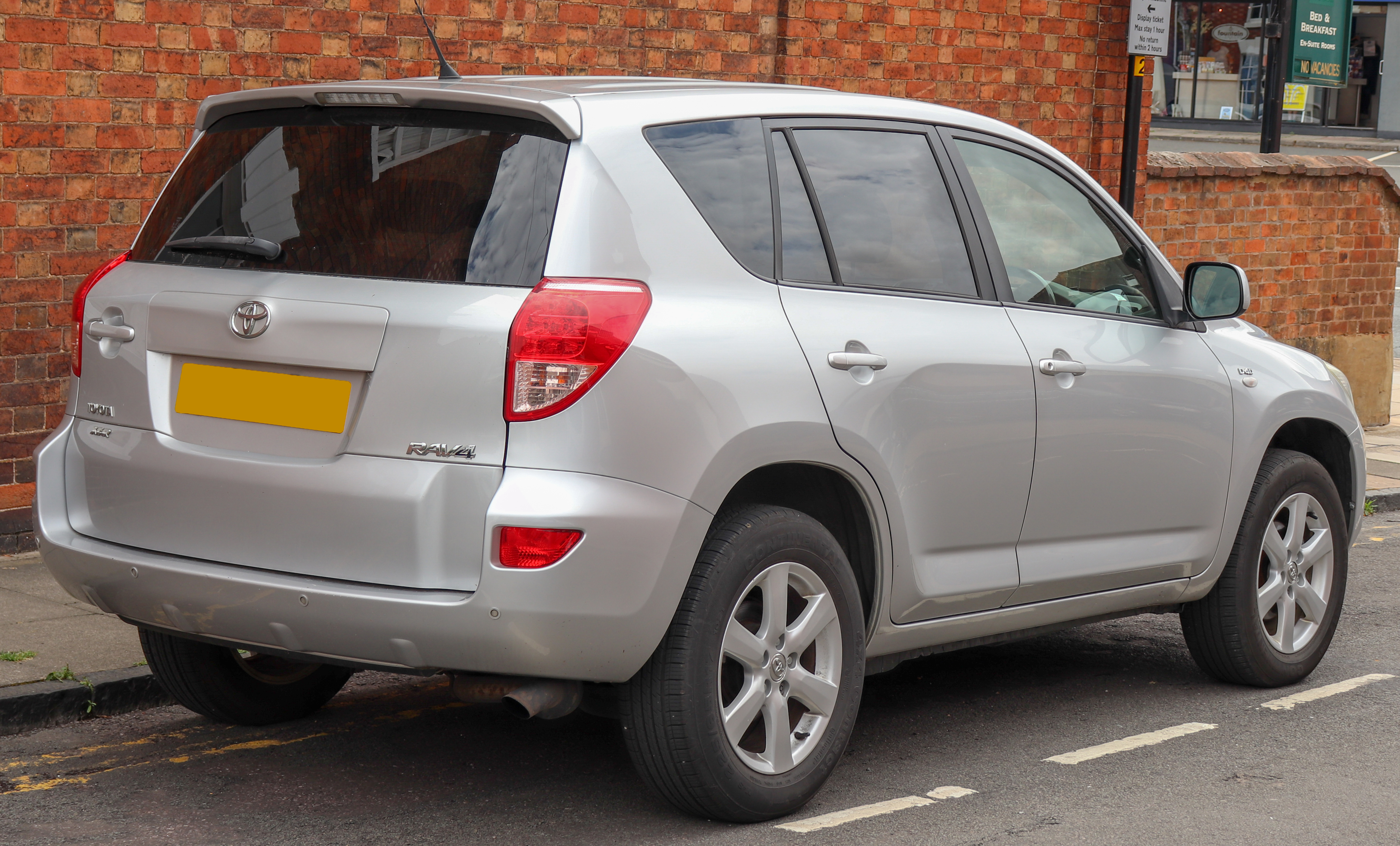
Pre-facelift RAV4 XTR (SWB)

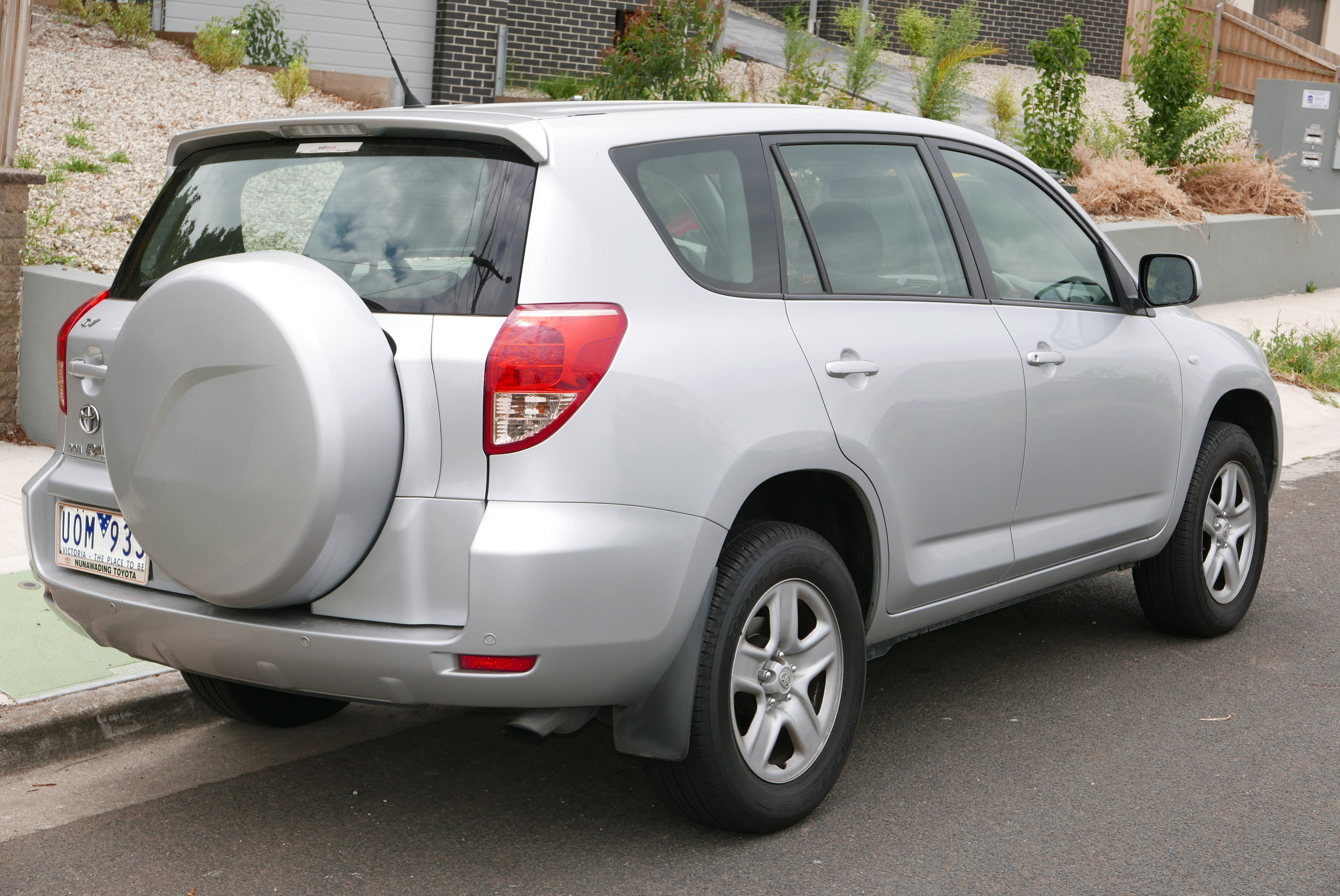
Pre-facelift RAV4 CV (Australia)

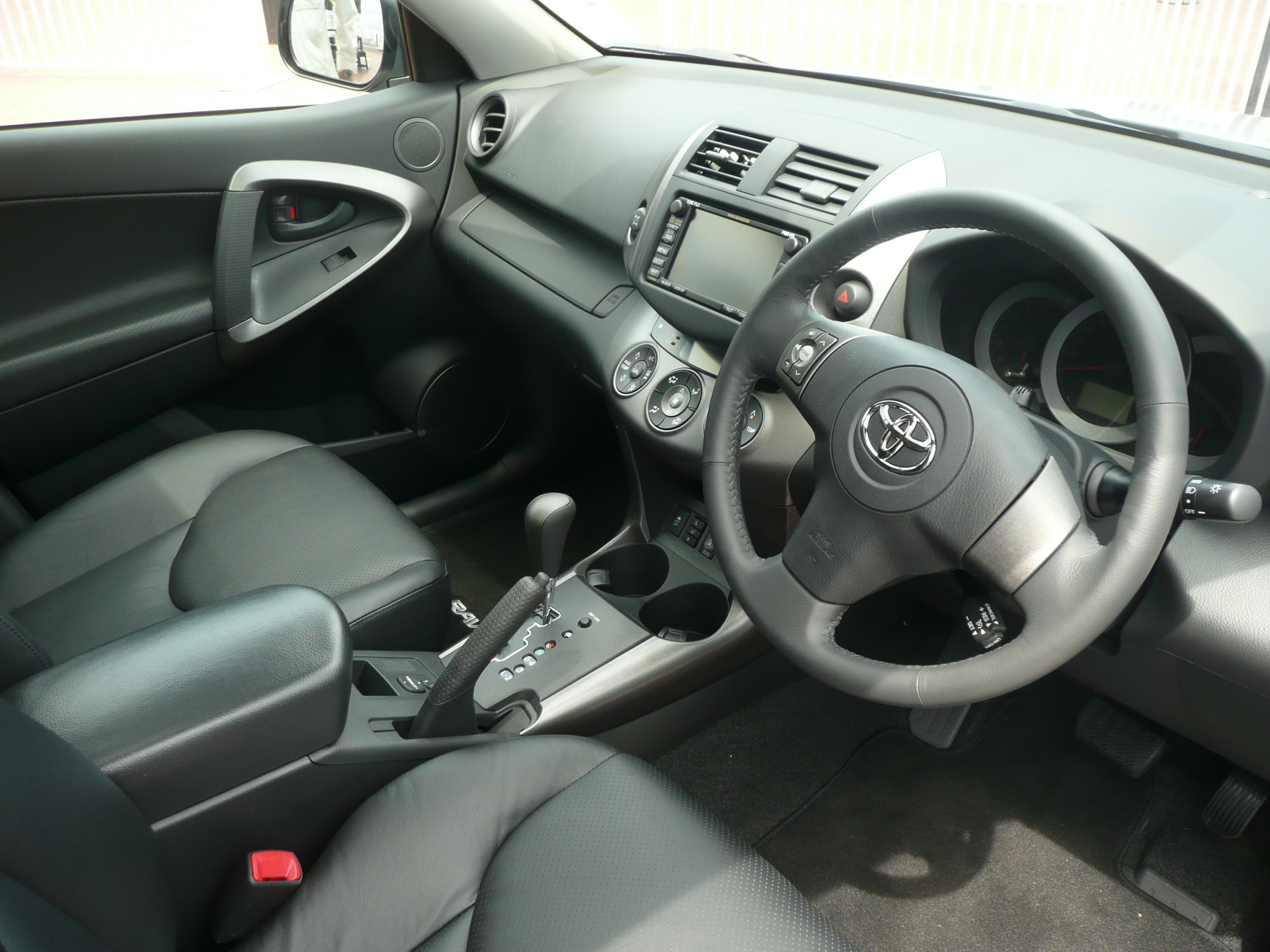
Interior

=== Markets ===
==== Japan ====
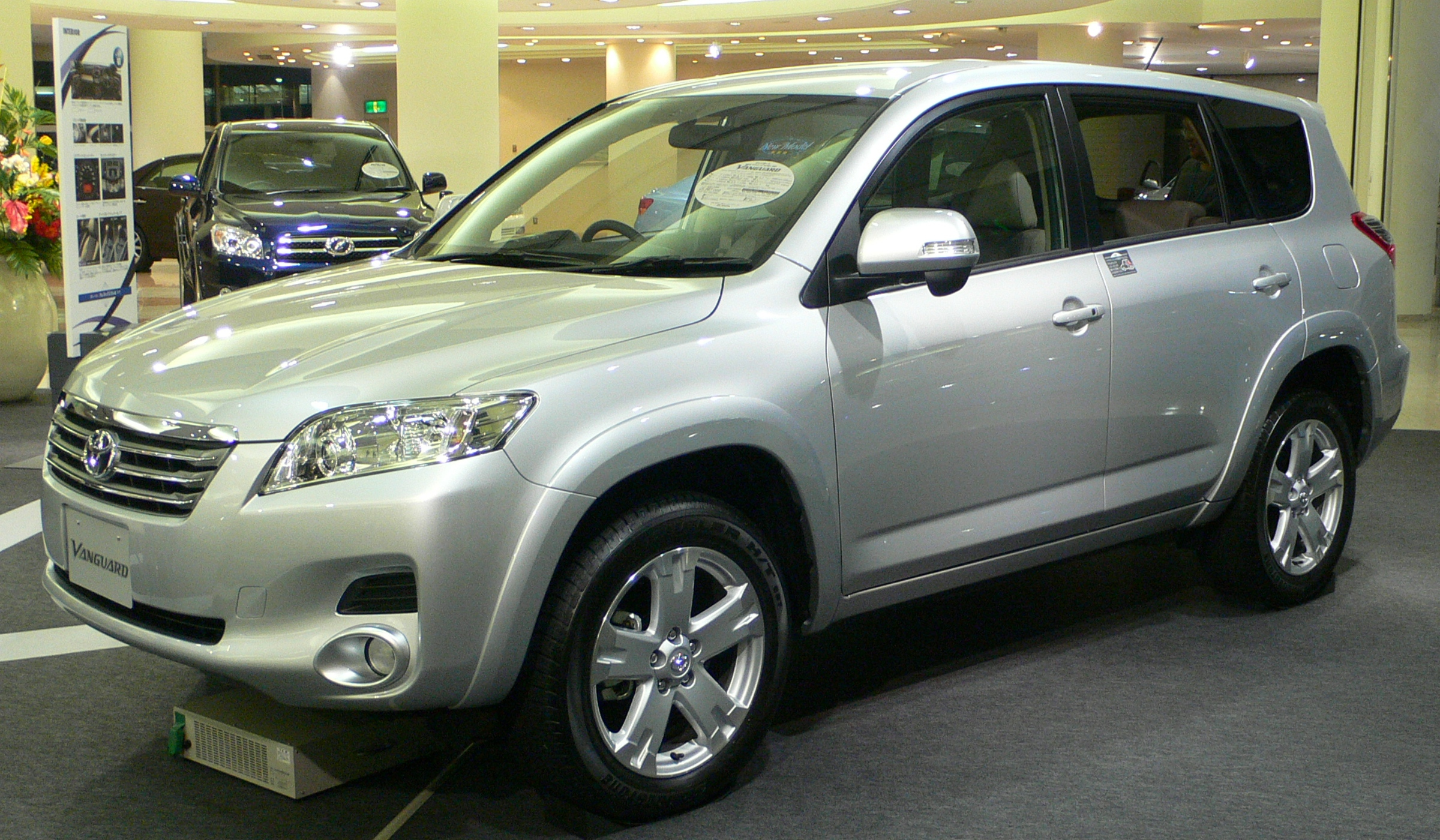
Toyota Vanguard (Japan; pre-facelift)

Model ranges include X, G and Sport, replacing RAV4 L and RAV4 J. The X and G can be ordered with either front-wheel drive or four-wheel drive. The Sport model with over fenders is four-wheel drive only.

The extended-length RAV4 was sold in Japan as the Vanguard, released on 30 August 2007 and offered in 240S and 350S grades. It was sold in five- and seven-passenger versions and slots between the regular RAV4 and Kluger. The Vanguard was sold by Corolla and Toyopet retail sales channels. Booth grades are powered by North American market RAV4. As it was often the case in Japan-only vehicles, the Vanguard comes loaded with high-tech gadgets, including steering-assisted stability control, keyless entry and satellite navigation. The Vanguard received a facelift in 2010.

Unlike the North American variant that came with a 4-speed automatic gearbox, the Japanese RAV4 (or Vanguard) is equipped with a simulated 7-speed transmission from the K112 line also known as Super CVT-i Sports Sequential Shiftmatic. That was along with the upgraded 2AZ-FE that was rated at 125 kW (170 PS; 168 hp).

When the larger XA40 arrived in 2012, the short wheelbase model was kept in production for the Japanese market and sold instead of the new version until 2016.

==== Australia ====
In Australia, the third-generation RAV4 was sold in four-cylinder base CV, Cruiser, Cruiser L and the limited edition "Altitude" trim levels, and CV6, SX6, and ZR6 are 6-cylinder variants. The V6 was available from 2007 until the introduction of the XA40 RAV4 in 2013. Australia did not get the 2.5L 2AR-FE in the 3rd generation RAV4.

==== Middle East ====
In the Middle East, the third-generation RAV4 was available with a 2.4-litre engine. Most markets, including the United Arab Emirates (UAE) and Kingdom of Saudi Arabia (KSA), get the four-wheel drive model with an automatic gearbox, but KSA additionally gets a two-wheel-drive model as well, the base one with a manual gearbox.

==== North America ====
North American models include choices of 2.4-litre 2AZ-FE inline-four or 3.5-litre 2GR-FE V6 engine. The V6 model has 201 kW (273 PS; 270 hp). In model year 2009, a slightly larger 133 kW (181 PS; 178 hp) 2.5-litre 2AR-FE inline-four replaced the previous 124 kW (169 PS; 166 hp) 2.4-litre engine. Either four-cylinder engine came equipped with a four-speed automatic transmission. The North American RAV4 with 3.5-litre 2GR-FE V6 engine is fitted with a five-speed automatic transmission. All US models feature Toyota's Star Safety System which includes Vehicle Stability Control. The new RAV4 topped Toyota SUV sales in the United States for the first time.

No manual transmission or diesel engines are available on North American models.

Facelifted for the 2009 model year, North American models include the choice of a new 2AR-FE inline-four or 2GR-FE V6 engine. In 2009, it was also the first time that the Canadian market received a front-wheel drive model to lower the price of entry.

==== Mexico ====
In Mexico, the third-generation RAV4 was available in Base and Limited trim levels, but on the Limited trim 4WD became an option and the Base model added 17-inch steel wheels but the roof rack was still standard in both trims. For the refresh of 2009 the roof rack in the Base model was eliminated as standard equipment and the Sport trim was added to the line-up. Up to 2008MY all RAV4s in Mexico had four-cylinder engines but for 2009 the Sport model became available with the V6 engine, although the four-cylinder engine was still available. The Limited trim was only available with the V6 engine and four-wheel drive. For 2010, the RAV4 in Mexico has been simplified again to two trims but the Limited trim was dropped and consequently removed the four-wheel drive option, while the Base and Sport trims remained unchanged from 2009.

==== China ====
The XA30 RAV4 commenced production in China in April 2009. Trim levels were the 2.0 Classic, 2.0 Luxury, 2.0 Luxury Navi, 2.4 Luxury and 2.4 Luxury Navi. The 2.0-litre 1AZ-FE and 2.4-litre 2AZ-FE were standard paired to a 5-speed manual and 4-speed automatic gearbox.

The China-specific model had different styling compared to those sold in other countries, with a black strip that was placed in between the radiator and license plate like a moustache. It also had chrome bars below the front and rear bumpers. The license plate was also moved to the bottom bumper area to make way for the RAV4 logo and a rear fog lamp. Front and rear parking sensors are also standard.

=== First facelift (2008) ===
In 2008 (for the 2009 model year), the RAV4 was given a mid-cycle refresh in some markets, featuring a number of changes, including a redesigned front end and tweaked rear end. Much of the interior remains as before, albeit with some changes to the materials used within and improved soundproofing throughout the vehicle. The most notable change for this model year was the replacement of the 2.4-litre 4-cylinder 2AZ-FE petrol engine (124 kW; 166 hp) with the 2.5-litre 4-cylinder 2AR-FE petrol engine (133 kW; 179 hp), which resolved issues with excessive oil consumption and offered improved fuel economy, providing increased power output over the previous engine. Additionally, some safety improvements were made over previous model years.

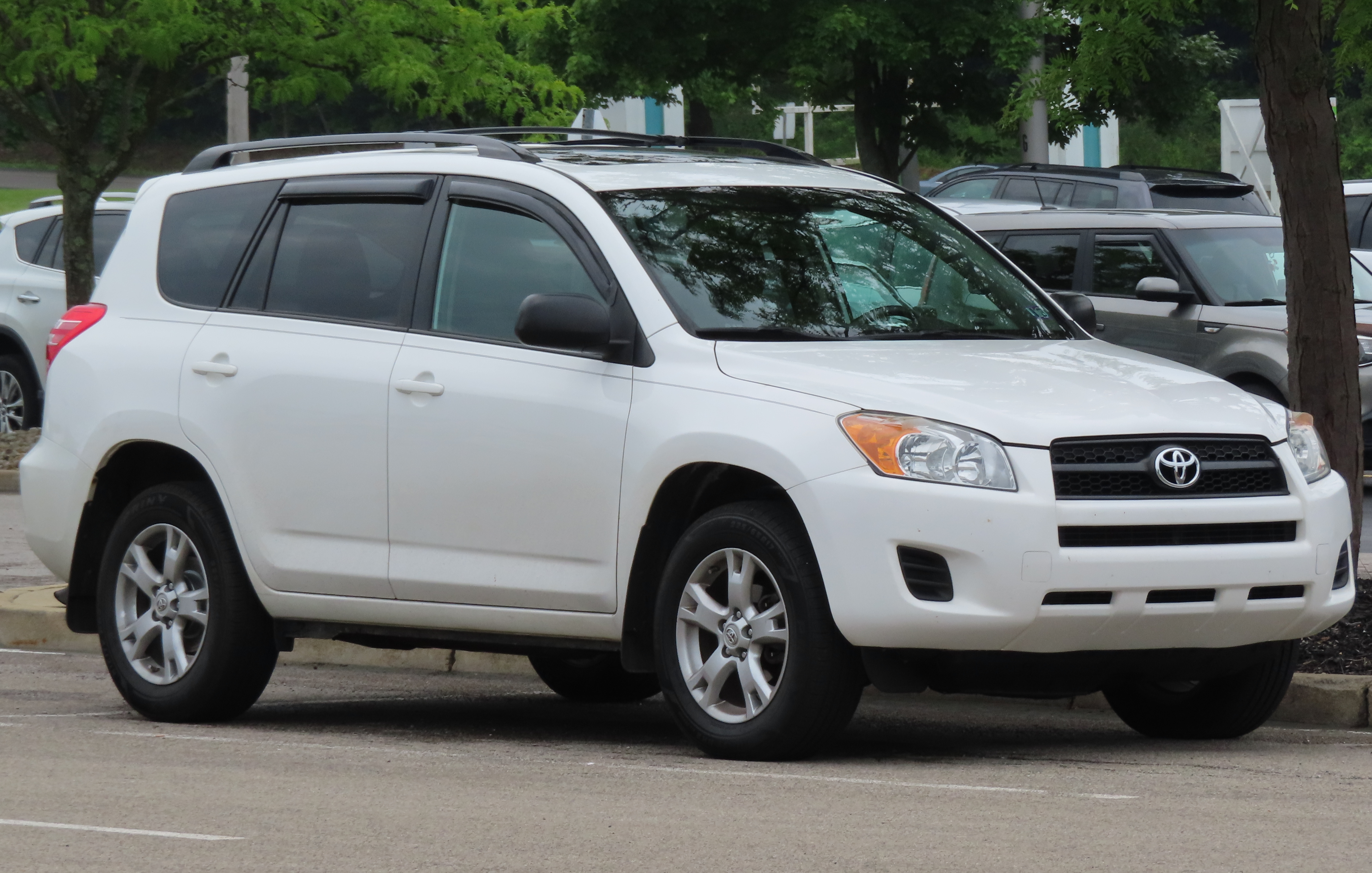
First facelift RAV4 (LWB)

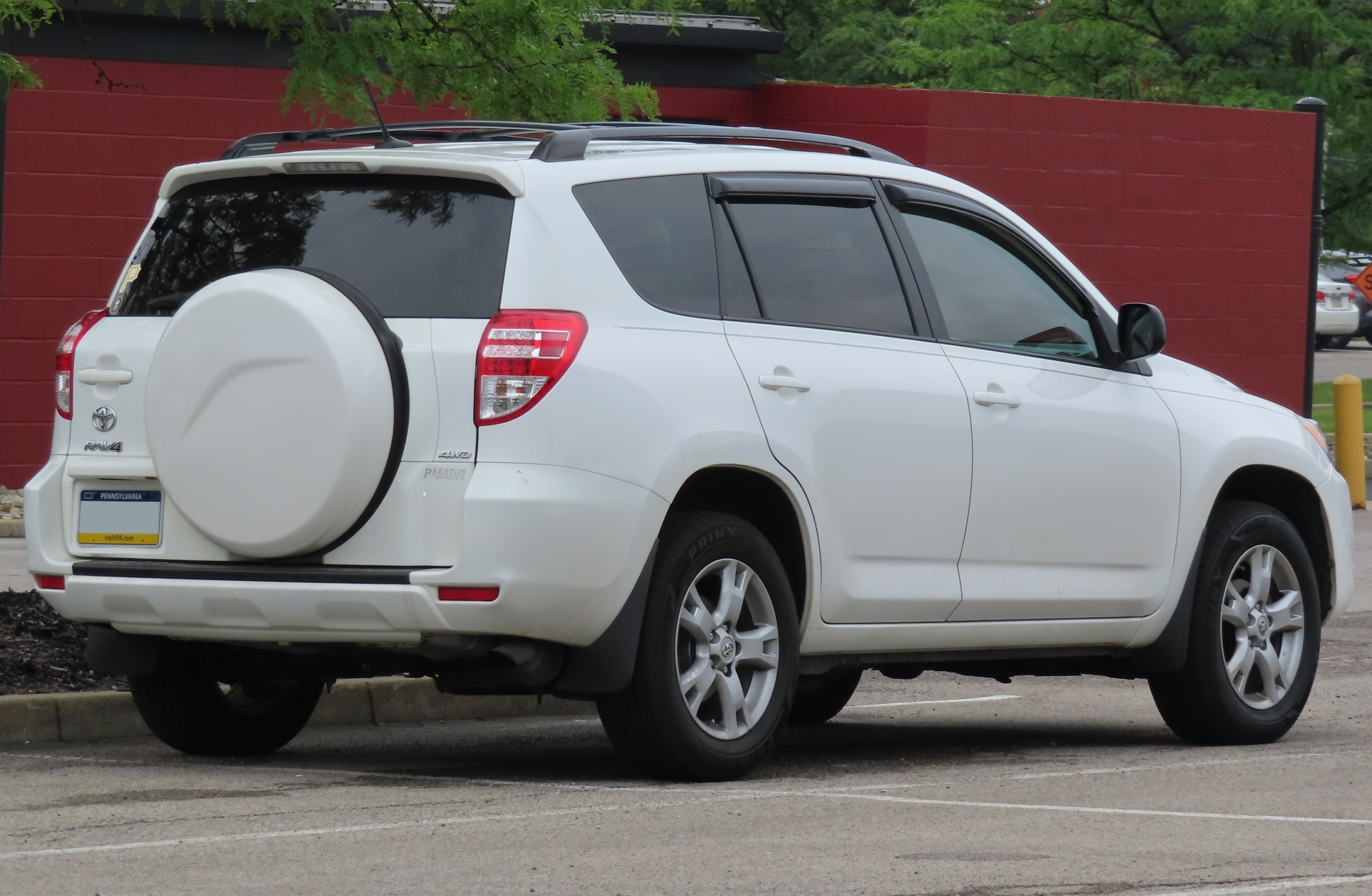
First facelift RAV4 (LWB)

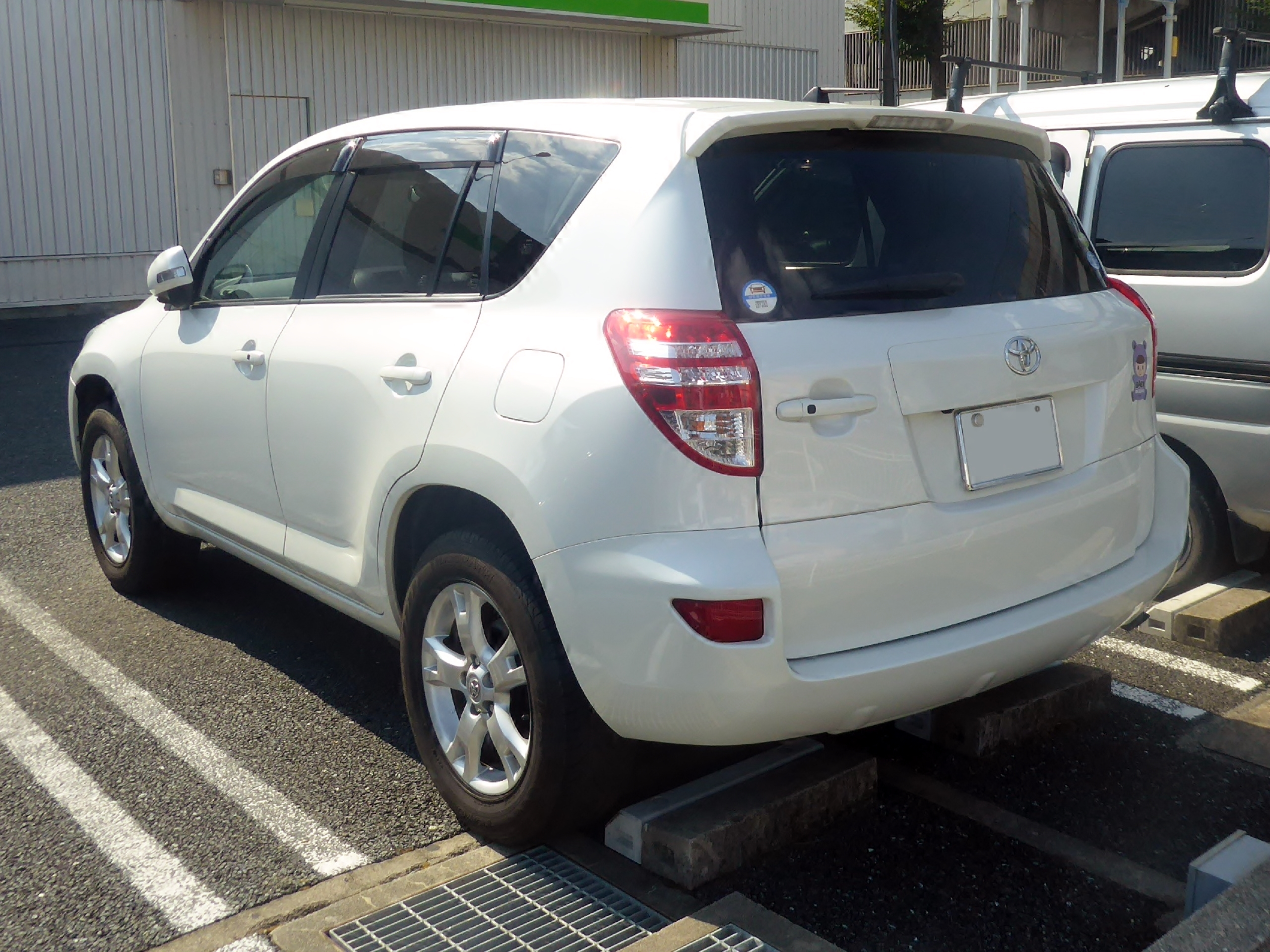
First facelift RAV4 (SWB)

=== Second facelift (2010) ===
In 2010 (for the 2011 model year), the RAV4 underwent another facelift, based on the Vanguard's styling. However, this only was for specific markets.

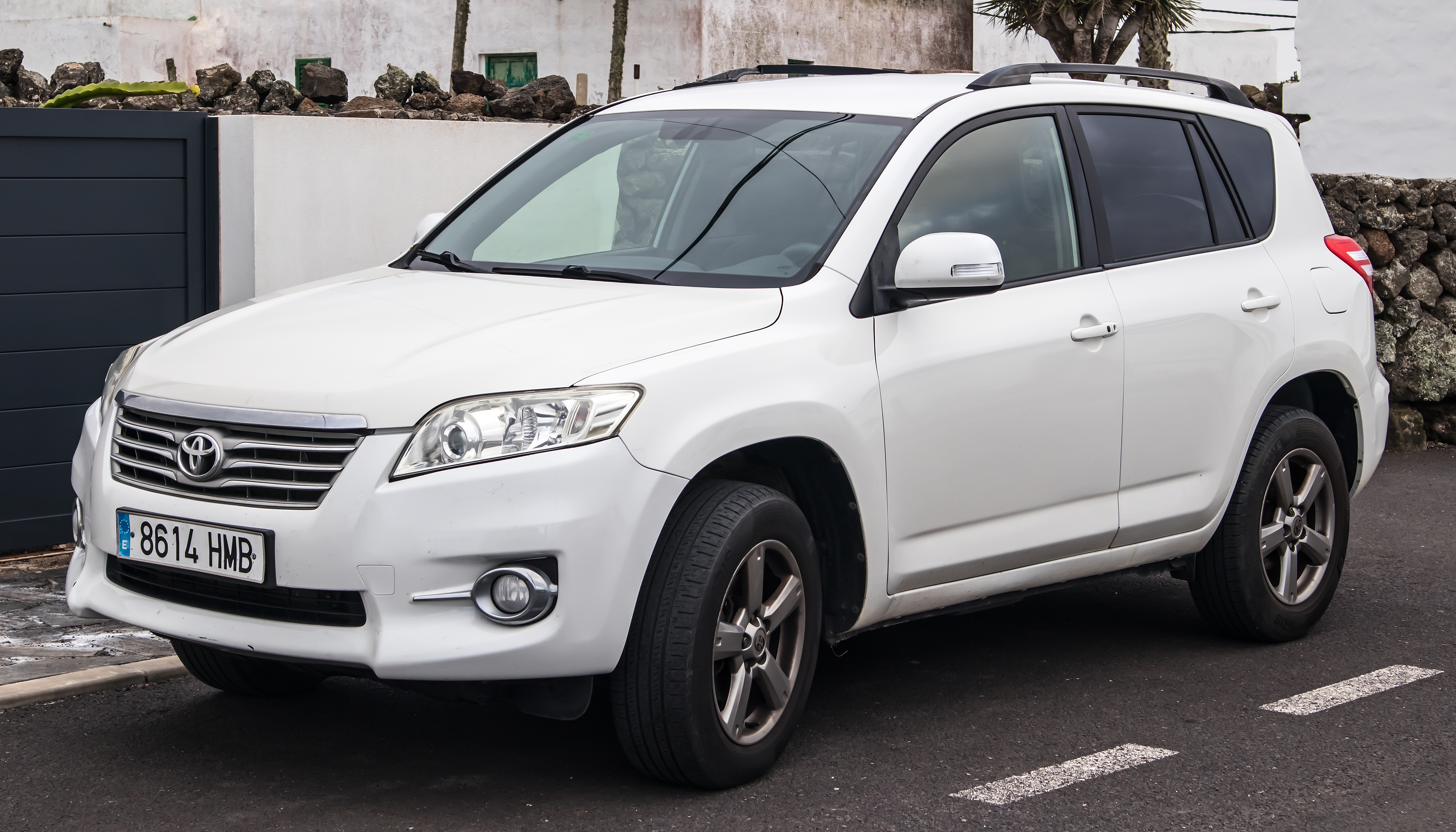
Second facelift RAV4 (SWB)

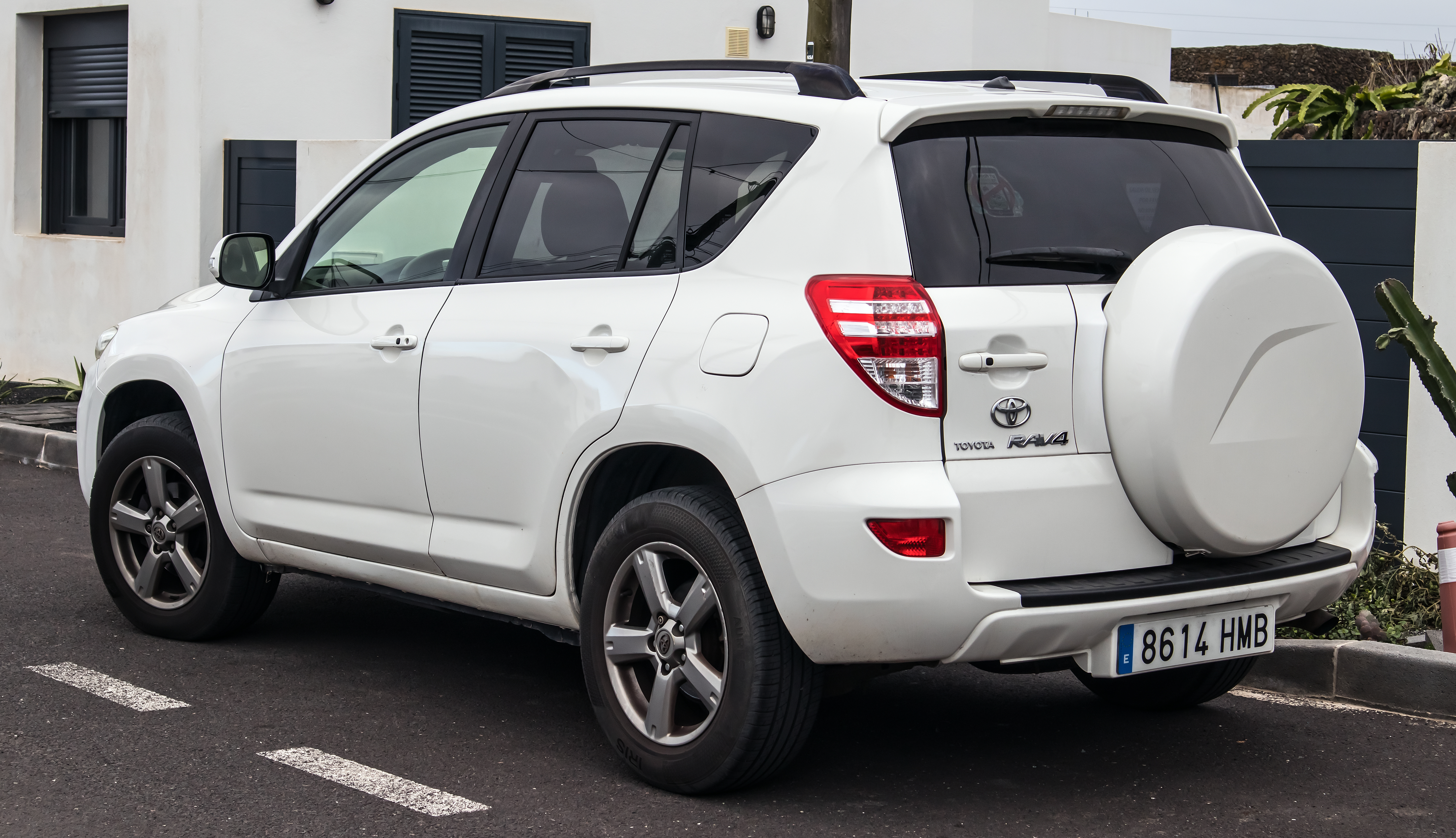
Second facelift RAV4 (SWB)

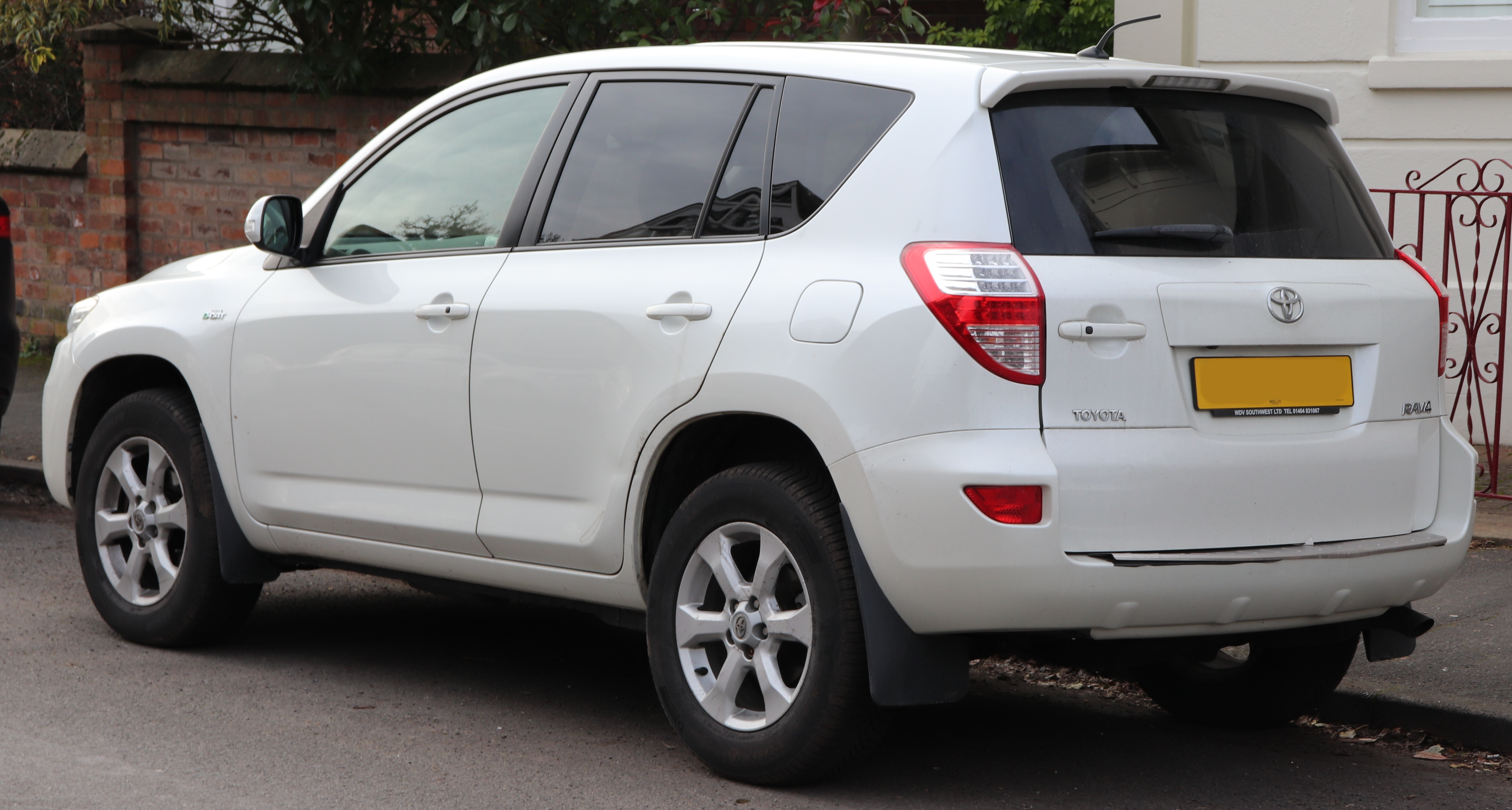
Second facelift RAV4 (without spare wheel, SWB)

=== Body styles ===
Body styles
| Chassis codes (DBA-A) | ACA31W | ACA36W | ACA33L | ACA37L | GSA30 | GSA33 | GSA35 | ALA30 | ALA31 | ALA36 | ZSA30 | ZSA35 |
|---|---|---|---|---|---|---|---|---|---|---|---|---|
| Drive | 4WD | FWD | 4WD | FWD | FWD | 4WD | 4WD | 4WD | 4WD | FWD | FWD | 4WD |
| Engine (Japan) | 2AZ-FE | 2AZ-FE | - | - | - | 2GR-FE | - | - | - | - | - | - |
| Engine (China) | - | - | 2AZ-FE | 1AZ-FE | - | - | - | - | - | - | - | - |
| Engine (Europe) | - | - | - | - | 2GR-FE | - | 2GR-FE | - | 2AD-FTV | 2AD-FTV | 3ZR-FAE | 3ZR-FAE |

=== Engines ===
Engines
| Code | Years | Type/code | Power, torque at rpm |
|---|---|---|---|
| 1AZ-FE (2.0 VVT-i) | 2005–2012 | 1,998 cc (121.9 cu in) (86.0 mm × 86.0 mm) I4 | 112 kW (152 PS; 150 hp) at 6,000 rpm, 194 N⋅m (143 lb⋅ft) at 4,000 rpm |
| 1AZ-FE (2.0 VVT-i) | 2007MY–2008MY (UK) | 1,998 cc (121.9 cu in) (86.0 mm × 86.0 mm) I4 | 112 kW (152 PS; 150 hp) at 6,000 rpm, 194 N⋅m (143 lb⋅ft) at 4,000 rpm |
| 2AZ-FE | 2005–2008 | 2,362 cc (144.1 cu in) (88.5 mm × 96.0 mm) I4 | 124 kW (169 PS; 166 hp) at 6,300 rpm, 224 N⋅m (165 lb⋅ft) at 4,000 rpm |
| 2AR-FE | 2009–2012 | 2,494 cc (152.2 cu in) (90.0 mm × 98.0 mm) I4 | 133 kW (181 PS; 178 hp) at 6,300 rpm, 233 N⋅m (172 lbf⋅ft) at 4,000 rpm |
| 2GR-FE | 2005–2012 | 3,456 cc (210.9 cu in) (94.0 mm × 83.0 mm) V6 | 200 kW (272 PS; 268 hp) at 6,200 rpm, 333 N⋅m (246 lb⋅ft) at 4,700 rpm |
| 3ZR-FAE (2.0 Valvematic) | 2008–2012 | 1,987 cc (121.3 cu in) (80.5 mm × 97.6 mm) I4 | 116 kW (158 PS; 156 hp) at 6,200 rpm, 198 N⋅m (146 lbf⋅ft) at 4,400 rpm |
| 2.0 D-4D | 2005–2006MY | 1,995 cc (121.7 cu in) (82.2 mm × 94.0 mm) I4 | 85 kW (116 PS; 114 hp) at 4,000 rpm, 250 N⋅m (184 lbf⋅ft) at 1,800–3,000 rpm |
| 2.2 D-4D Diesel | 2007MY–2008MY | 2,231 cc (136.1 cu in) (86.0 mm × 96.0 mm) I4 | 100 kW (136 PS; 134 hp) at 3,600 rpm, 310 N⋅m (229 lbf⋅ft) at 2,000–2,800 rpm |
| 2.2 D-4D Diesel 180 (UK) | 2007MY | 2,231 cc (136.1 cu in) (86.0 mm × 96.0 mm) I4 | 130 kW (177 PS; 174 hp) at 3,600 rpm, 400 N⋅m (295 lbf⋅ft) at 2,000–2,600 rpm |
| 2.2 D-4D, 2.2 D-CAT (UK) | 2008–2012 | 2,231 cc (136.1 cu in) (86.0 mm × 96.0 mm) I4 | 110 kW (150 PS; 148 hp) at 3,600 rpm, 340 N⋅m (251 lbf⋅ft) at 2,000–2,800 rpm |
| 2.2 D-CAT | 2008–2012 | 2,231 cc (136.1 cu in) (86.0 mm × 96.0 mm) I4 | 130 kW (177 PS; 174 hp) at 3,600 rpm, 400 N⋅m (295 lbf⋅ft) at 2,000–2,800 rpm |

=== RAV4 EV (second generation) ===
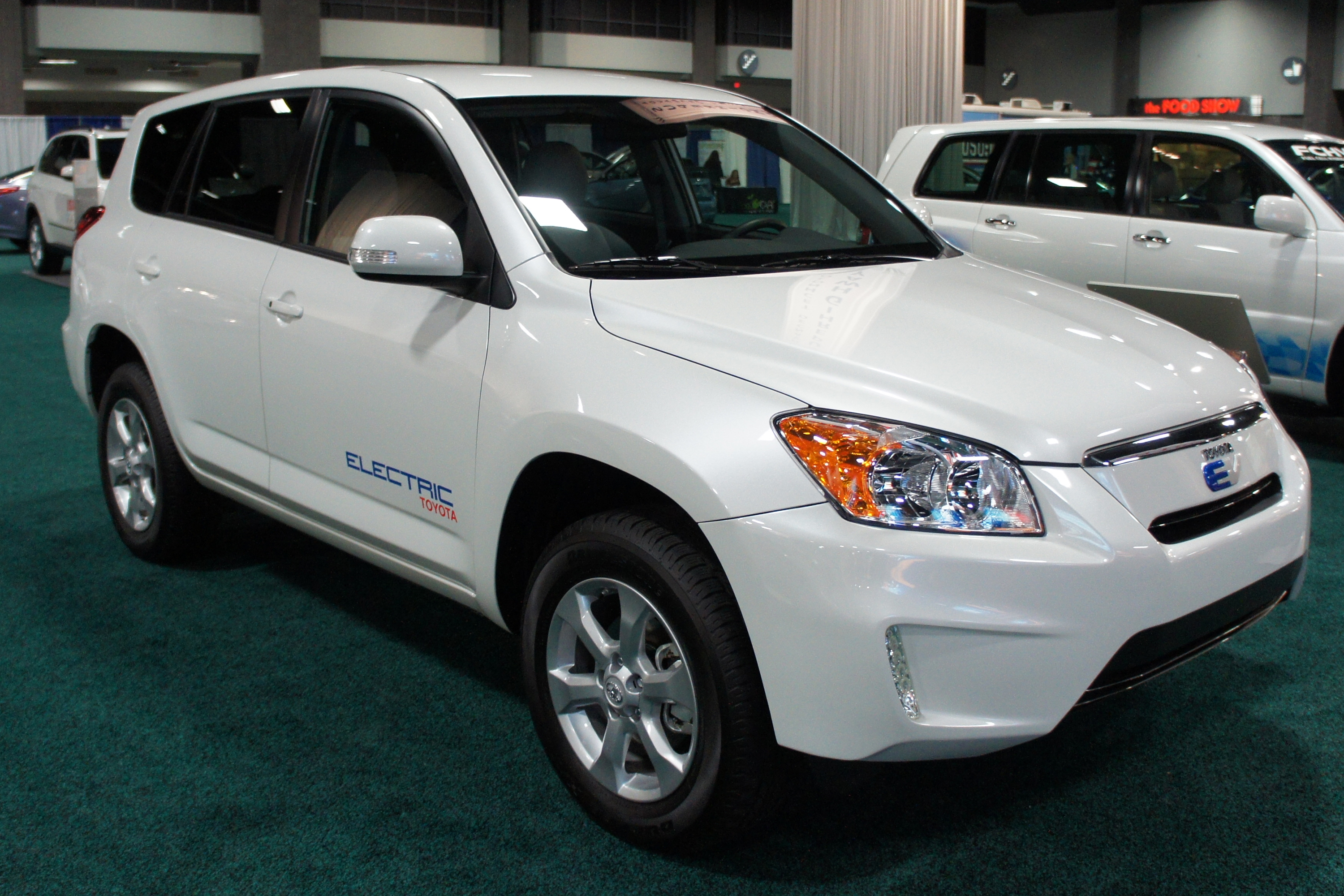
Toyota RAV4 EV

Toyota worked together with Tesla Motors to develop the second generation RAV4 EV; the electric SUV was scheduled for market launch late in the third quarter of 2012. Production was limited to 2,600 units during the first three years, and sales were limited to California only, beginning with the San Francisco Bay Area, Los Angeles/Orange County and San Diego.

The second generation RAV4 EV has a 115 kW (156 PS; 154 hp) motor powered by a 41.8 kWh lithium-ion battery pack that Toyota expects to deliver a US Environmental Protection Agency rated range of 148 km (92 miles) in standard charge mode and 182 km (113 miles) in extended charge mode, for a combined range of 166 km (103 miles) and a combined fuel economy rating of 3.1 L/100 km (91 mpg_{‑imp}; 76 mpg_{‑US}). The RAV4 EV battery pack and electronic components are similar to those used in the Tesla Model S sedan launched in June 2012, because Tesla Motors is the manufacturer of the powertrain. About 2,500 RAV4 EVs were built between 2012 and August 2014, with the battery supply deal between Toyota and Tesla concluding with the end of production.

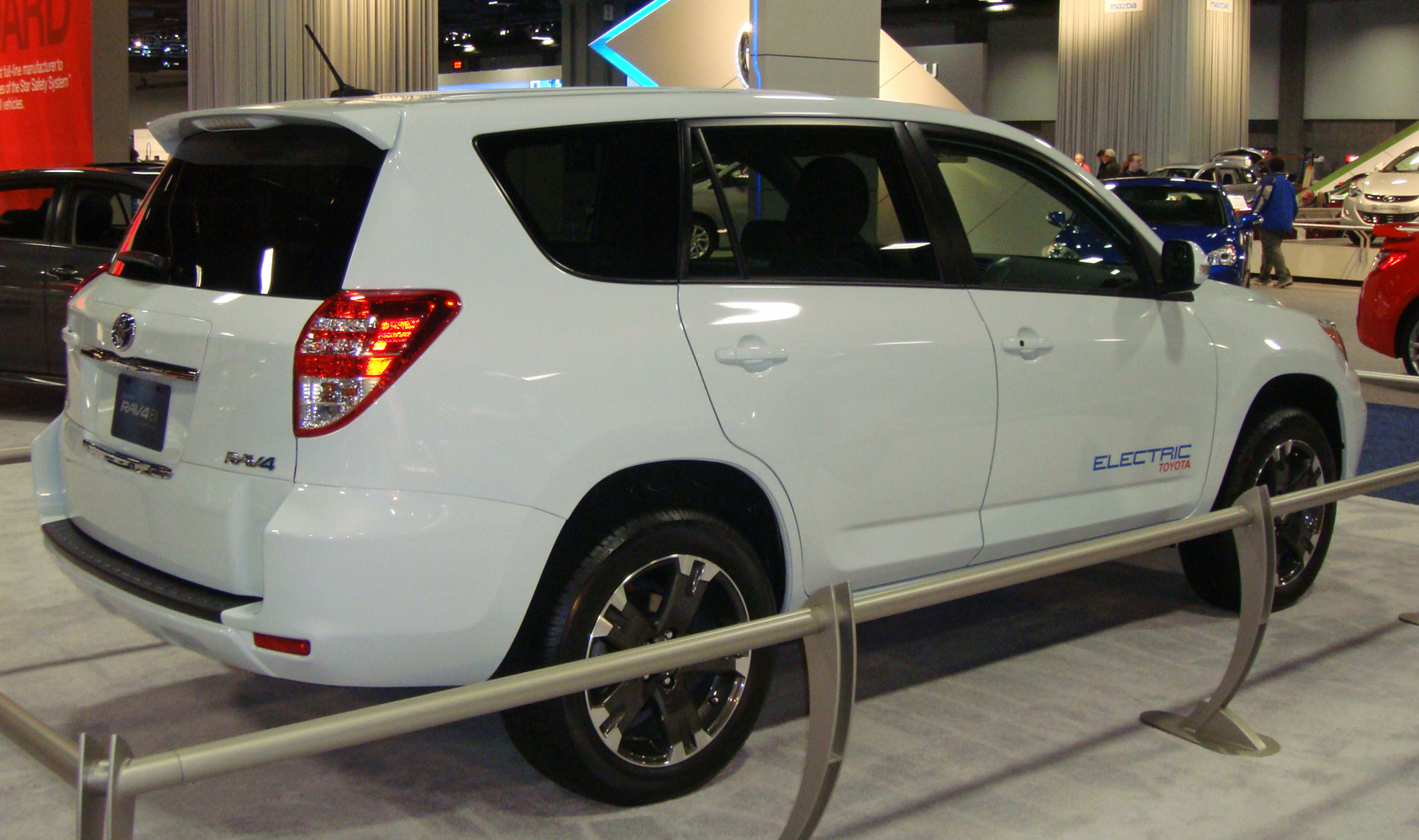
RAV4 EV (rear)

=== Safety ===
==== ANCAP ====
ANCAP test results* Toyota RAV4 variant(s) as tested (2007)
| Test | Score |
|---|---|
| Overall | 4 /5 stars |
| Frontal offset | 11.94/16 |
| Side impact | 16/16 |
| Pole | Not Assessed |
| Seat belt reminders | 2/3 |
| Whiplash protection | Not Assessed |
| Pedestrian protection | Adequate |
| Electronic stability control | Optional |

==== Euro NCAP ====
Euro NCAP test results* Toyota RAV4 D-4D (LHD) (2006)
| Test | Score | Rating |
|---|---|---|
| Adult occupant: | 32 | 4 /5 stars |
| Child occupant: | 39 | 4 /5 stars |
| Pedestrian: | 21 | 3 /4 stars |

==== IIHS ====
IIHS scores (2006 model year)
| Moderate overlap front (original test) | Good |
| Side impact (original test) | Good |
| Roof strength | Acceptable |
| Head restraints and seats | Marginal |

IIHS scores (2009 model year)
| Moderate overlap front (original test) | Good |
| Side (original test) | Good |
| Roof strength | Acceptable |
| Head restraints and seats | Good |

== Fourth generation (XA40; 2012) ==
Fourth generation
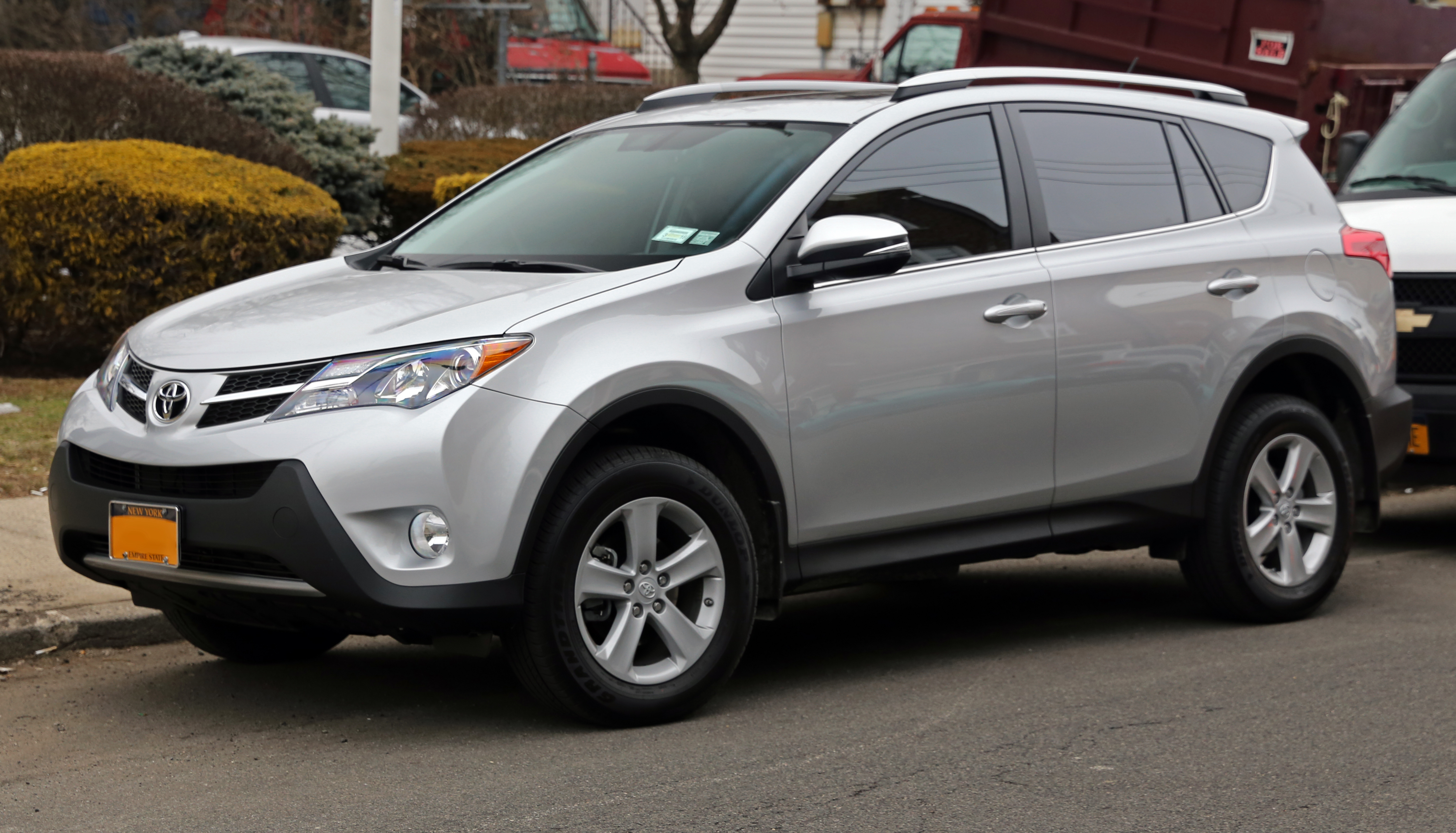
- Pre-facelift Toyota RAV4 XLE

Overview
- Model code: XA40
- Production: December 2012 – November 2018; 2013–2019 (China)
- Model years: 2013–2018
- Assembly: Japan: Ōbu, Aichi (Nagakusa plant); Toyota, Aichi (Takaoka plant); Tahara, Aichi (Tahara plant); Canada: Woodstock, Ontario (TMMC); China: Changchun, Jilin (FAW Toyota); Russia: Saint Petersburg
- Designer: Masaki Okue, Hideki Hayashi, Akira Kubota and Takuya Watabe

Body and chassis
- Body style: 5-door SUV
- Platform: Toyota New MC platform
- Related: Toyota Harrier (XU60); Lexus NX (AZ10)

Powertrain
- Engine: Petrol: 2.0 L 3ZR-FAE Valvematic I4; 2.0 L 3ZR-FE Dual VVT-i I4; 2.5 L 2AR-FE VVT-i I4; Diesel: 2.0 L 2WW-FTV I4; 2.2 L 2AD-FTV/-FHV D-4D turbo I4; Petrol hybrid: 2.5 L 2AR-FXE I4
- Transmission: 6-speed manual; 6-speed U760E/F AutoDrive automatic; CVT; eCVT (hybrid)

Dimensions
- Wheelbase: 2,660 mm (104.7 in)
- Length: 4,570–4,605 mm (179.9–181.3 in)
- Width: 1,845 mm (72.6 in)
- Height: 1,660–1,705 mm (65.4–67.1 in)
- Curb weight: 1,550–1,595 kg (3,417–3,516 lb); 1,710–1,785 kg (3,770–3,935 lb) (hybrid)

The fourth-generation RAV4 was a complete redesign; it was revealed at the November 2012 Los Angeles Auto Show. Unlike the previous generations, it featured a rear liftgate rather than a side-opening rear door and no longer had the spare wheel mounted on the rear door.

The RAV4 no longer offers a V6 engine like the previous generation—all engine choices were inline four-cylinder engines. Also, while the previous XA30 model was offered in regular and extended wheelbase lengths, the XA40 was only sold in a single wheelbase length (corresponding to the long wheelbase XA30).

The full hybrid system combined a 2.5-litre Atkinson cycle petrol engine with an electric motor, a high voltage generator, a 204-cell nickel–metal hydride battery located under the rear seats, a power control unit, and a power split device. RAV4 Hybrids were available in both front and four-wheel drive variants. The four-wheel drive came equipped with a second, 50 kW high-voltage, a rear-mounted electric motor that offers increased traction and a 1,750-pound (790 kg) towing capacity. The rear's electric motor operates independently from the hybrid system front's electric motor, driving the rear wheels alone. US sales began in early January 2013. Trim levels available were the LE, XLE, and Limited.

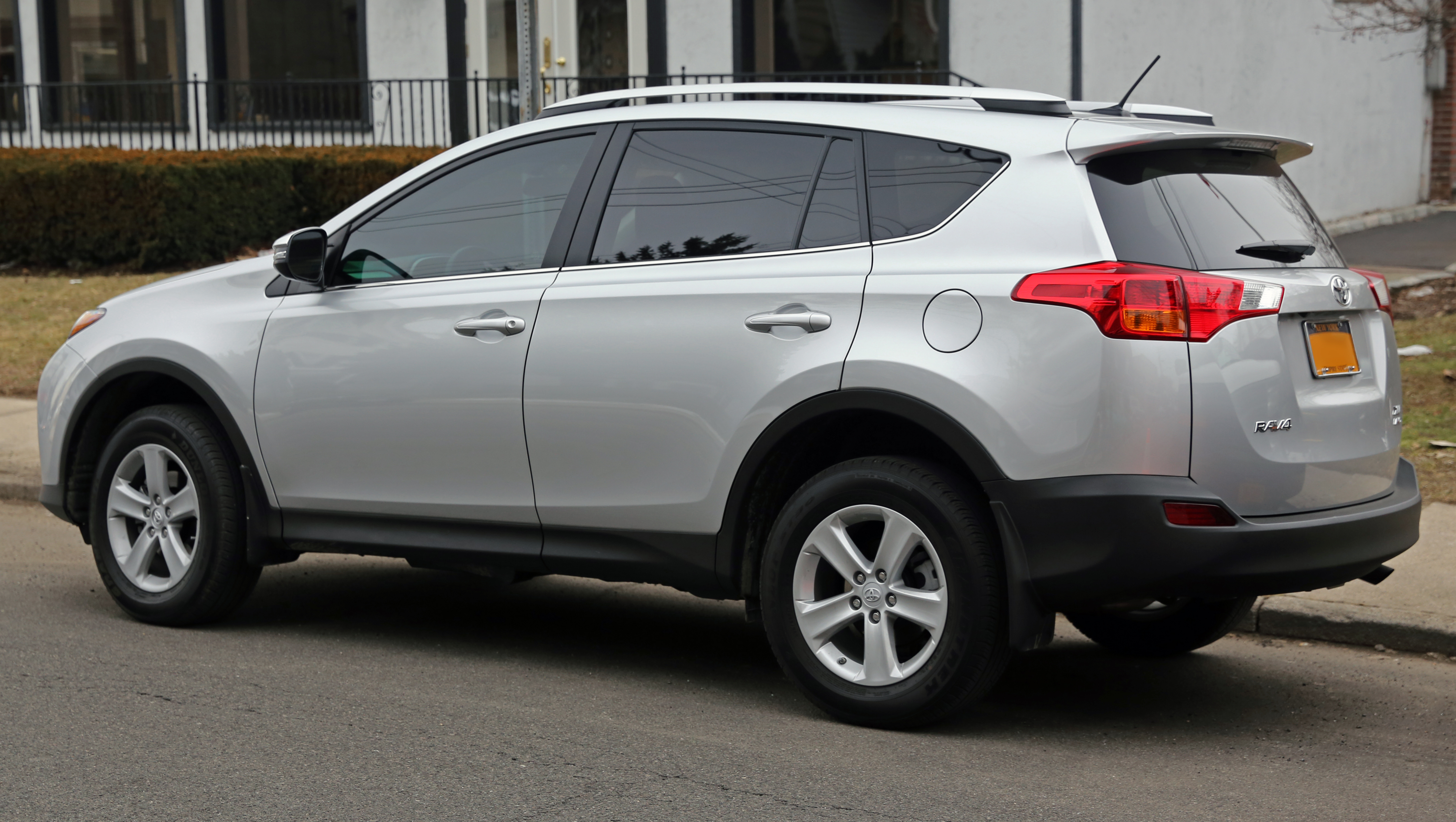
Pre-facelift Toyota RAV4 XLE

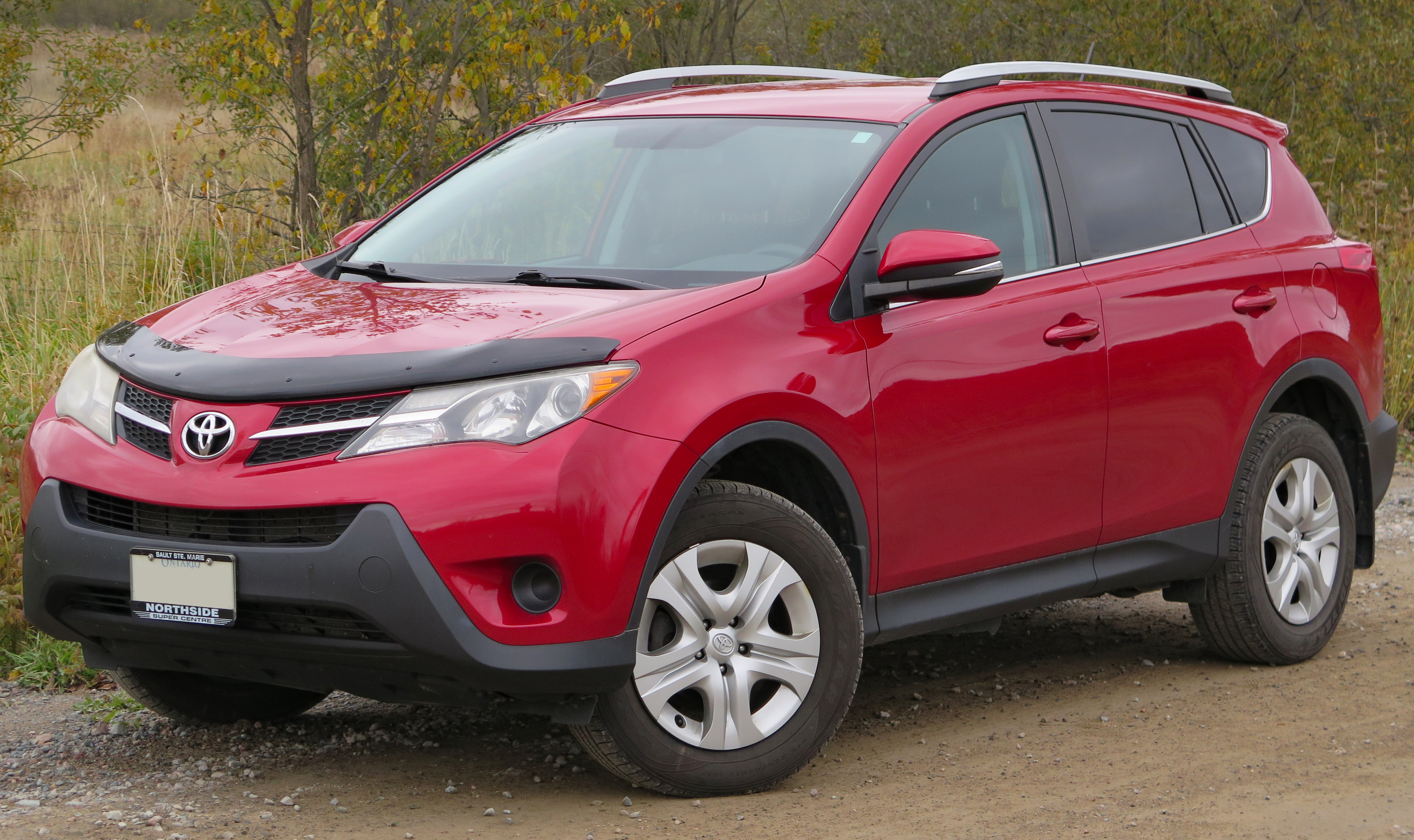
2015 Pre-facelift Toyota RAV4 LE

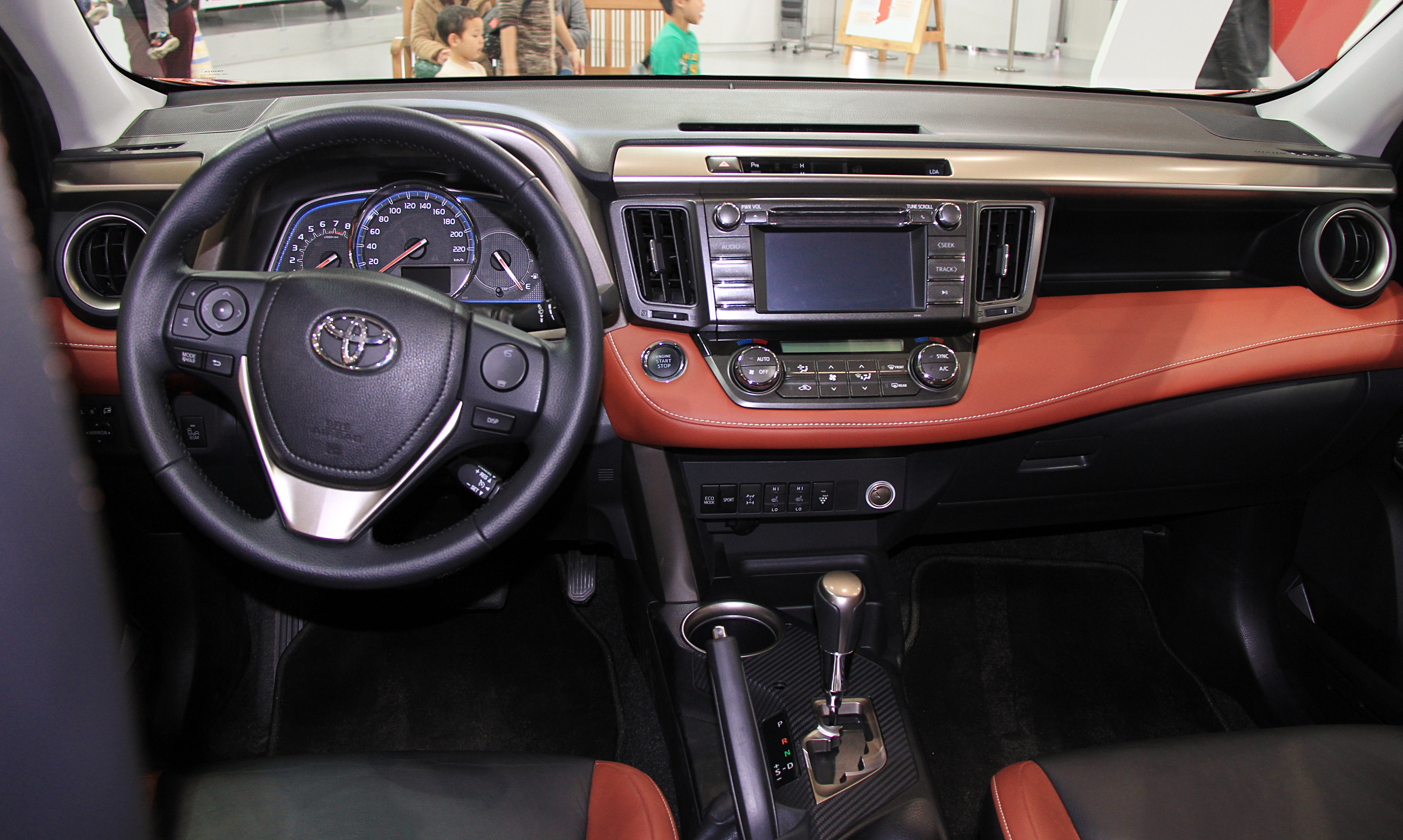
Interior

=== Markets ===
For the Japanese market, the previous generation in short-wheelbase length remained on sale in Japan until 2016 instead of the newer, export only, XA40. The Harrier replaced the long-wheelbase model in Japan, previously badged as the Vanguard.

In Australia, the fourth-generation RAV4 went on sale in February 2013. Engine choices included a 2.0- and 2.5-litre four-cylinder petrol, and 2.0- and 2.2-litre turbo-diesels. Transmissions included a six-speed manual (UK/Australia only), Continuously Variable Transmission (CVT), and six-speed automatic.

The UK model went on sale in 2013. Early European models included a choice of a 2.0-litre petrol or one of three 2.0-litre diesel engines.

The RAV4 manufactured in Woodstock, Ontario, Canada had about 50 percent of its parts coming from Japan.

Taiwanese models included a 2.0-litre Dual VVT-i inline four-cylinder engine with CVT or 2.5-litre Dual VVT-i inline-four engine with six-speed automatic.

Production in China commenced in August 2013 and was sold alongside the XA30 model for a short time. The XA40 RAV4 in China came standard with the 2.0-litre 6ZR-FE and 2.5-litre 5AR-FE petrol engine. 6 speed manual, automatic and CVT gearboxes are standard. Seven trim levels were available.

Production in Russia started in August 2016.

=== Facelift (2015) ===
In 2015, for the 2016 model year, Toyota released a facelift for the XA40 series. The facelift debuted with the RAV4 Hybrid shown at the April 2015 New York International Auto Show. The facelift included redesigned LED front and rear lamps and updated speedometer dials with full colour TFT multi information display.

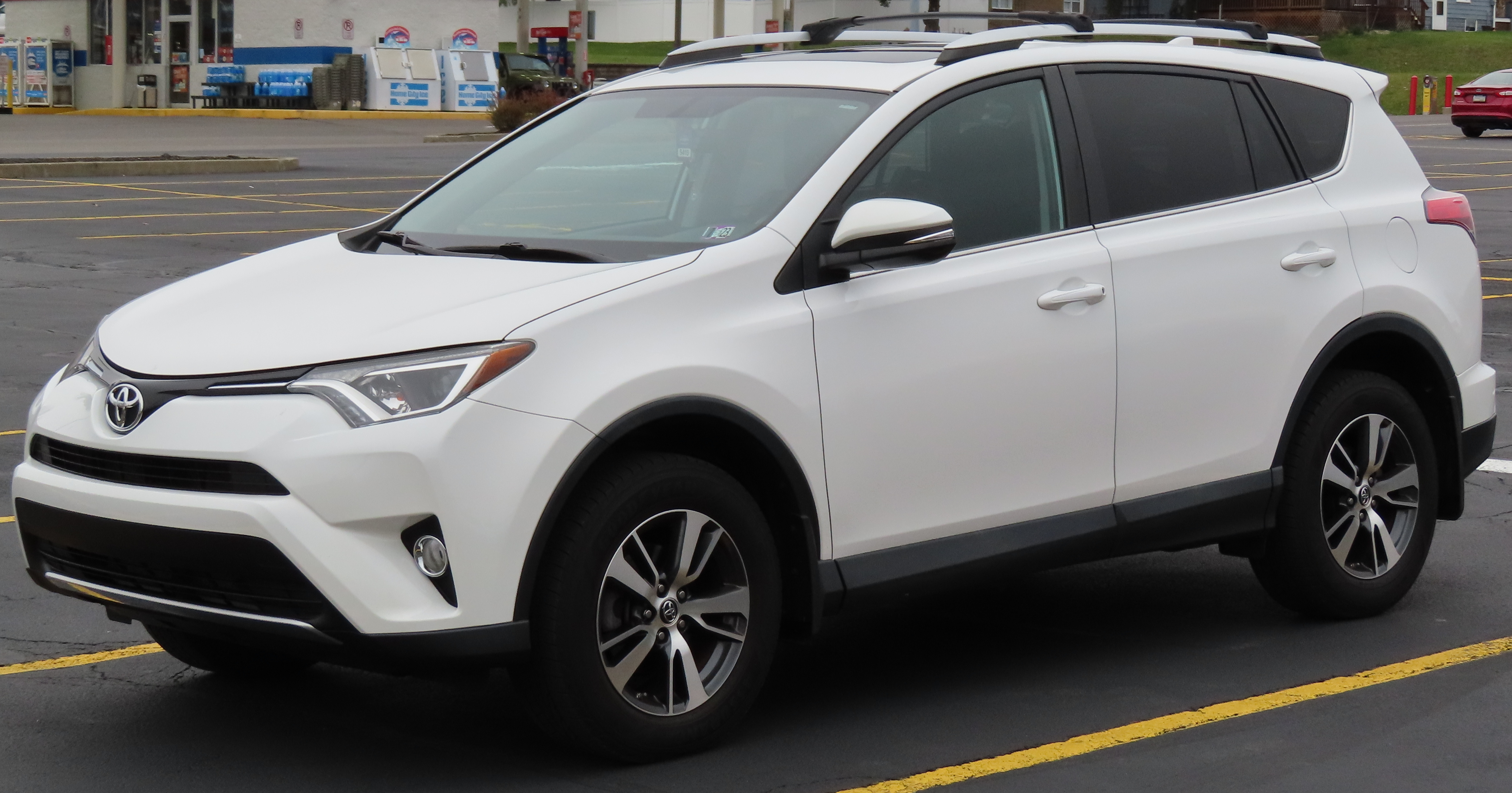
Facelift Toyota RAV4 XLE AWD

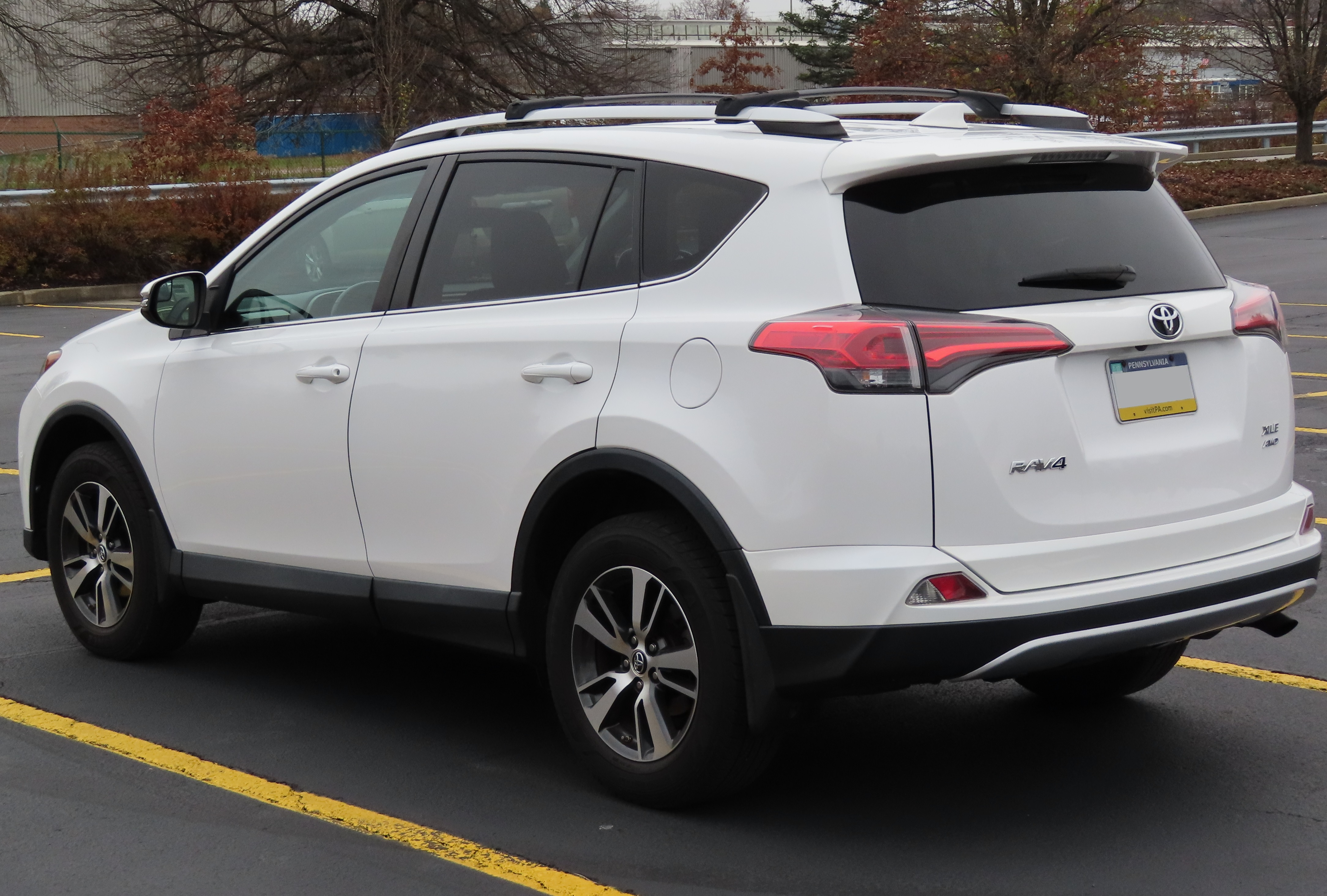
Facelift Toyota RAV4 XLE AWD

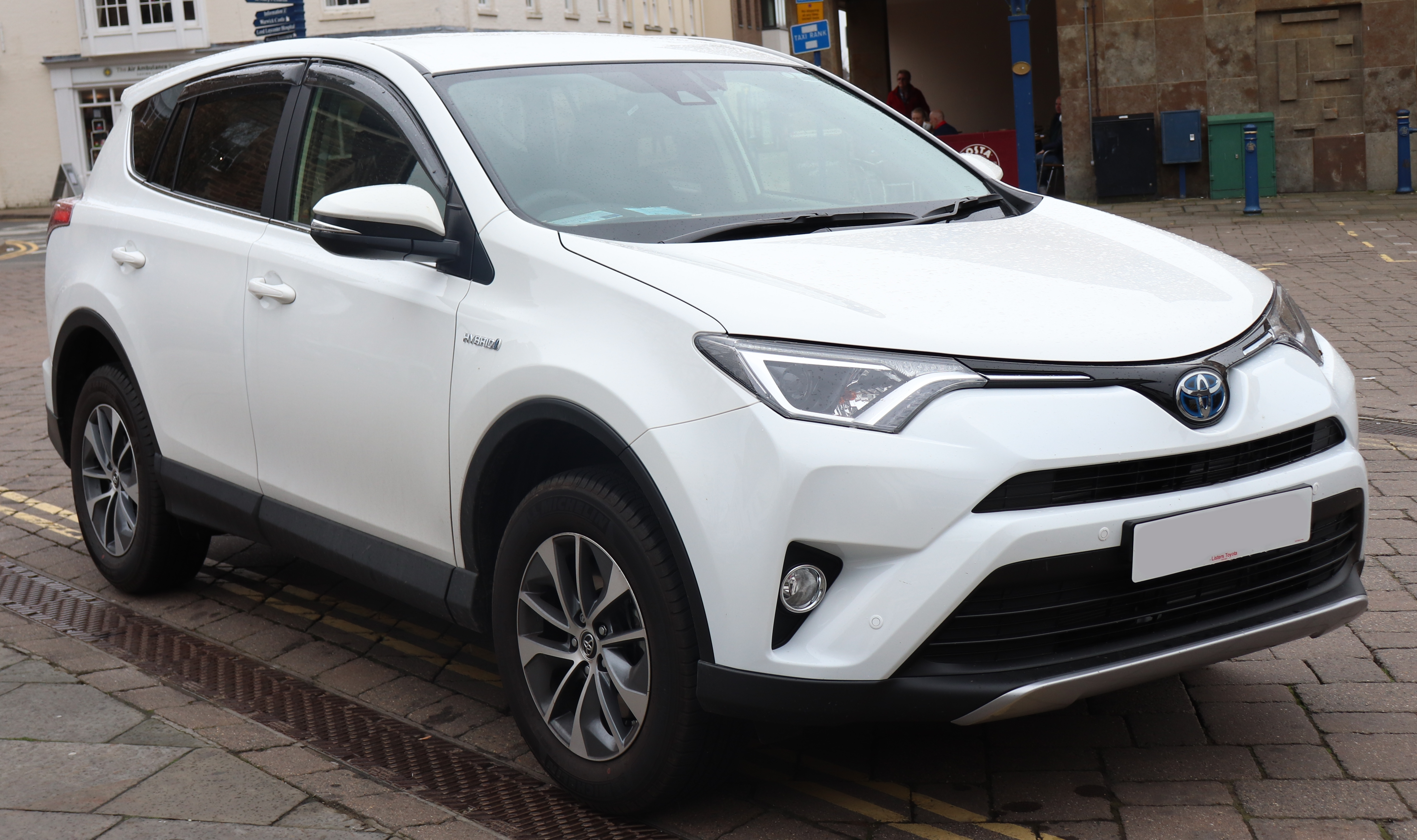
Facelift Toyota RAV4 Hybrid Icon

=== RAV4 Adventure and RAV4 Premium (2013) ===
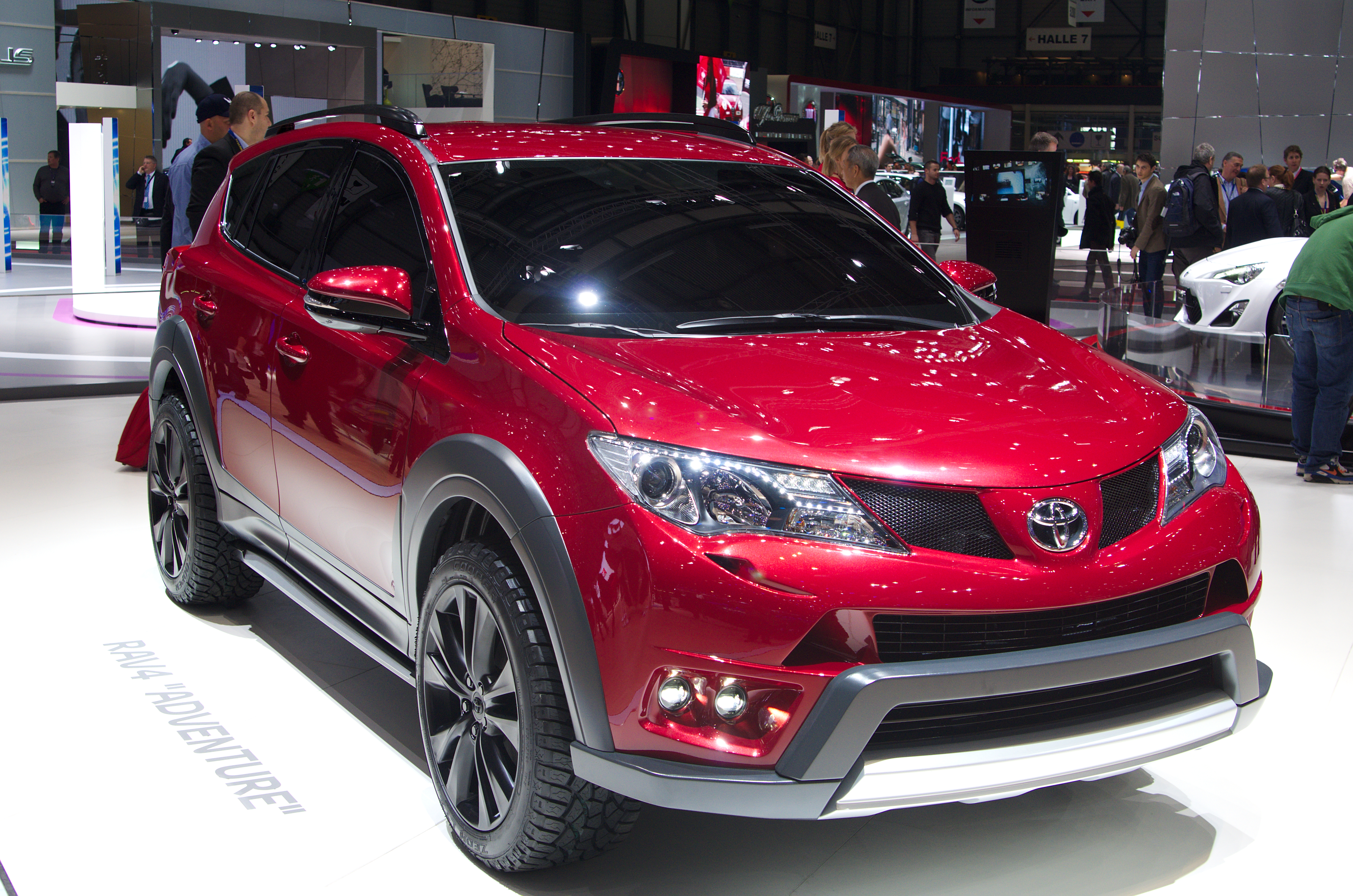
RAV4 Adventure at Geneva, 2013 (concept)

The RAV4 Adventure is a concept vehicle that accentuated the car's look to reinforce its off-road capabilities. It included dark red body colour, extended wheel arches, 20-inch alloy wheels and matte painted front and rear bumpers.

The RAV4 Premium is a concept vehicle with Deep Bronze body colour, bumpers in Deep Bronze, chrome-finished spoiler, chrome inserts in the rear bumper, brushed aluminium skid plates, integrated tailpipe at the rear bumper, 20-inch wheels, leather interior upholstery designed by Toyota's Kansei design department, seats with black piping and V-shaped outline, two-tone double stitching and grey and black leather on the instrument panel and door panels.

Both vehicles were unveiled in March 2013 at the Geneva Motor Show.

A production version of the RAV4 Adventure was added to the US lineup in September 2017.

=== Engines ===
Petrol engines
| Model | Year(s) | Displacement | Fuel type | Power | Torque | 0–100 km/h (62 mph) | CO2 Emissions |
|---|---|---|---|---|---|---|---|
| 2.0 FWD | 2012–2018 | 1,987 cc (121.3 cu in) | Petrol | 111 kW (151 PS; 149 hp) | 195 N⋅m (144 ft⋅lb) | 9.9 s | 167 g/km |
| 2.0 Multidrive AWD | 2012–2018 | 1,987 cc (121.3 cu in) | Petrol | 111 kW (151 PS; 149 hp) | 195 N⋅m (144 ft⋅lb) | 10.7 s | 166 g/km |
| 2.5 AWD | 2012–2018 | 2,494 cc (152.2 cu in) | Petrol | 131 kW (178 PS; 176 hp) | 233 N⋅m (172 ft⋅lb) | 8.6 s | 169 g/km; 23 city/29 hwy |
| 2.5 Hybrid AWD | 2015–2018 | 2,494 cc (152.2 cu in) | Petrol/Electric Motor | 145 kW (197 PS; 194 hp) combined | 279 N⋅m (206 ft⋅lb) combined | 8.1 s | 115 g/km; 33 city/31 hwy |

Diesel engines
| Model | Year(s) | Displacement | Power | Torque | 0–100 km/h (0–62 mph) | CO2 Emissions |
|---|---|---|---|---|---|---|
| 120D 4x2 | 2012–2018 | 1,998 cc (121.9 cu in) | 91 kW (124 PS; 122 hp) | 310 N⋅m (229 ft⋅lb) | 10.5 s | 127 g/km |
| 120D AWD | 2013–2018 | 1,998 cc (121.9 cu in) | 91 kW (124 PS; 122 hp) | 310 N⋅m (229 ft⋅lb) | 13.6 s | 136 g/km |
| 150D AWD | 2012–2018 | 2,231 cc (136.1 cu in) | 110 kW (150 PS; 148 hp) | 340 N⋅m (251 ft⋅lb) | 9.6 s | 147 g/km |
| 150D Autodrive AWD | 2012–2018 | 2,231 cc (136.1 cu in) | 110 kW (150 PS; 148 hp) | 340 N⋅m (251 ft⋅lb) | 10.0 s | 173 g/km |

=== Safety ===
==== ANCAP ====
ANCAP test results* Toyota RAV4 all variants (2013)
| Test | Score |
|---|---|
| Overall | 5 /5 stars |
| Frontal offset | 13.56/16 |
| Side impact | 16/16 |
| Pole | 2/2 |
| Seat belt reminders | 3/3 |
| Whiplash protection | Good |
| Pedestrian protection | Adequate |
| Electronic stability control | Standard |

ANCAP test results* Toyota RAV4 all variants (2015)
| Test | Score |
|---|---|
| Overall | 5 /5 stars |
| Frontal offset | 13.56/16 |
| Side impact | 16/16 |
| Pole | 2/2 |
| Seat belt reminders | 3/3 |
| Whiplash protection | Good |
| Pedestrian protection | Adequate |
| Electronic stability control | Standard |

ANCAP test results* Toyota RAV4 all variants (2016)
| Test | Score |
|---|---|
| Overall | 5 /5 stars |
| Frontal offset | 13.56/16 |
| Side impact | 16/16 |
| Pole | 2/2 |
| Seat belt reminders | 3/3 |
| Whiplash protection | Good |
| Pedestrian protection | Adequate |
| Electronic stability control | Standard |

==== Euro NCAP ====
Euro NCAP test results* Toyota RAV4 2.2 diesel mid-grade (LHD) (2012)
| Test | Points | % |
|---|---|---|
| Overall: | 5 /5 stars | |
| Adult occupant: | 32.3 | 89% |
| Child occupant: | 40.5 | 82% |
| Pedestrian: | 24 | 66% |
| Safety assist: | 6 | 66% |

==== IIHS ====
In the Insurance Institute for Highway Safety (IIHS) evaluations, the 2013 and 2014 model year RAV4 achieved a "good" crashworthiness rating for head restraints and seats, roof strength, side, and moderate overlap front, while achieving a "poor" rating in the IIHS Small Overlap Frontal Test. Modifications were made starting in the 2015 model year which increased the small overlap front rating to "good".

The small overlap test, introduced in 2012 by the IIHS, simulates a frontal collision on 25 percent of the driver's side. Since its adoption, the IIHS has noticed several automakers making non-symmetrical modifications to their vehicles, including the RAV4. Another small overlap test was conducted on a number of vehicles, including a 2015 RAV4, but was conducted on the passenger side instead. The RAV4 fared the worst and would have received a "poor" rating if the IIHS were to provide ratings for passenger-side protection. The crash test's intrusion was 330 mm (13 in) further into the vehicle on the passenger's side than on the driver's side and caused the passenger door to open during the crash.

Insurance Institute for Highway Safety (IIHS)
| Moderate overlap frontal offset | Good |
| Small overlap frontal offset (driver) 2013–14 | Poor |
| Small overlap frontal offset (driver) 2015–19 | Good |
| Small overlap frontal offset (passenger) | Poor |
| Side impact | Good |
| Roof strength | Good |

==== Latin NCAP ====
The Japan-made RAV4 in its most basic Latin American market configuration with 3 airbags received 5 stars for adult occupant and 4 stars for toddlers from Latin NCAP 1.0 in 2015.

Latin NCAP 1.5 test results Toyota RAV 4 + 3 Airbags (2015, similar to Euro NCAP 2002)
| Test | Points | Stars |
|---|---|---|
| Adult occupant: | 16.41/17.0 | 5 /5 stars |
| Child occupant: | 36.56/49.00 | 4 /5 stars |

== Fifth generation (XA50; 2018) ==
Fifth generation
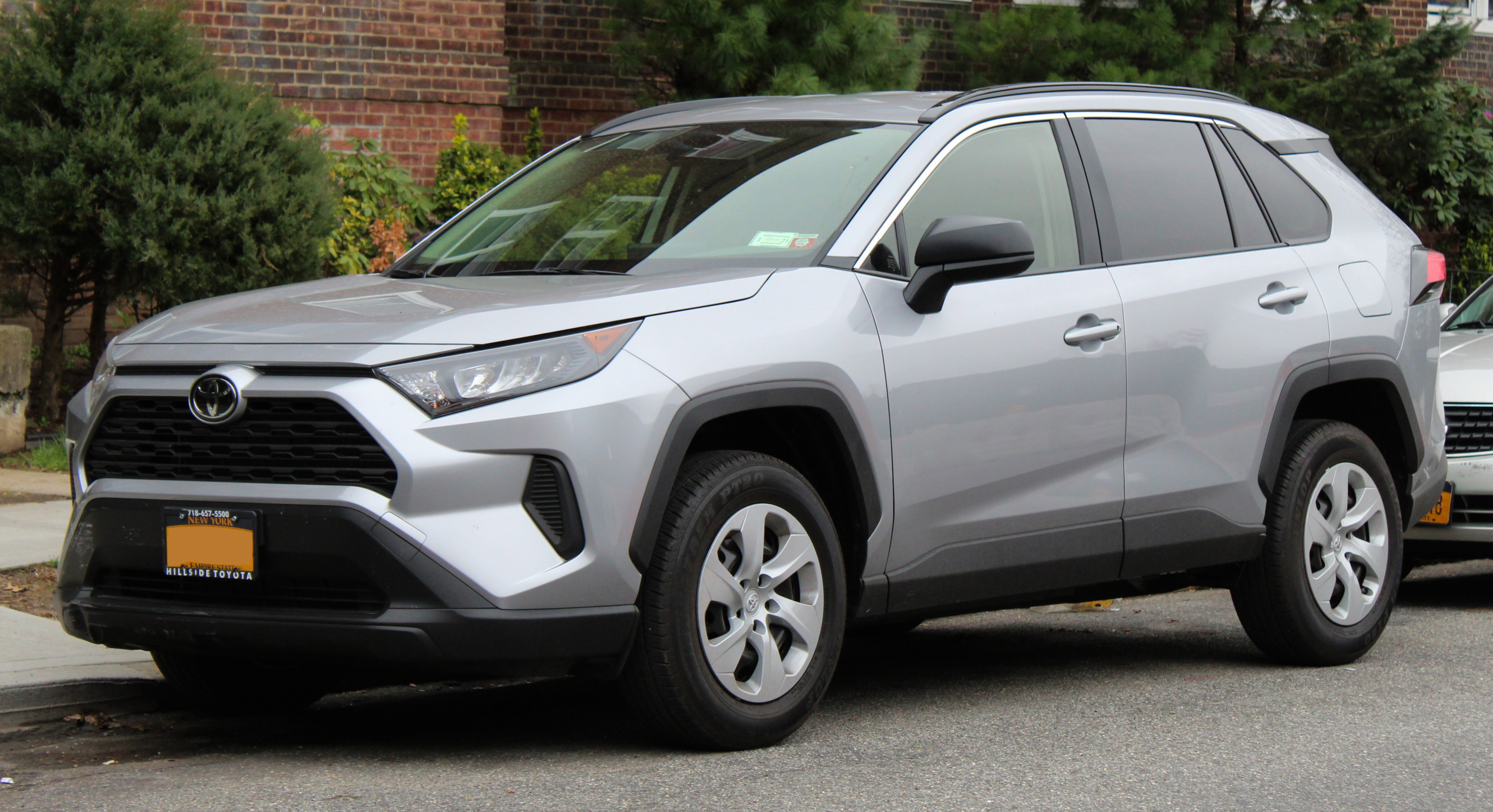
- Pre-facelift Toyota RAV4 LE

Overview
- Model code: XA50
- Also called: Toyota Wildlander (GAC Toyota, China); Suzuki Across (Europe, plug-in hybrid)
- Production: November 2018 – December 2025; 2018–2022 (Russia)
- Model years: 2019–2025
- Assembly: Japan: Ōbu, Aichi (Toyota Industries Nagakusa plant); Toyota, Aichi (Takaoka Plant); Canada: Woodstock, Ontario; Cambridge, Ontario (TMMC); China: Changchun, Jilin (FAW Toyota); Guangzhou (GAC Toyota); United States: Georgetown, Kentucky (TMMK); Russia: Saint Petersburg (TMMR; 2018–2022)
- Designer: Hideo Koyama, Daisuke Iguchi, Shun Kawaguchi, Junya Furuta and Tatsuya Sonoda

Body and chassis
- Body style: 5-door SUV
- Platform: TNGA: GA-K
- Related: Toyota Camry (XV70); Toyota Harrier/Venza (XU80); Mitsuoka Buddy; Lexus NX (AZ20)

Powertrain
- Engine: Petrol: 2.0 L M20A-FKS I4; 2.0 L M20C-FKS I4 (Wildlander, China); 2.0 L M20D-FKS I4 (China); 2.5 L A25A-FKS I4; 2.5 L A25C-FKS I4 (Wildlander, China); 2.5 L A25G-FKS I4 (China); Petrol hybrid: 2.5 L A25A-FXS I4; 2.5 L A25D-FXS I4 (Wildlander, China); 2.5 L A25F-FXS I4 (China); Petrol plug-in hybrid (PHEV): 2.5 L A25A-FXS I4; 2.5 L A25D-FXS I4 (Wildlander, China); 2.5 L A25F-FXS I4 (China)
- Electric motor: Permanent magnet synchronous: 88 kW (118 hp) 3NM (front, hybrid); 134 kW (180 hp) 5NM (front, PHEV); 40 kW (54 hp) 4NM (rear)
- Power output: 126 kW (169 hp) (2.0 L); 151 kW (202 hp) (2.5 L); 163 kW (219 hp) (hybrid, combined); 225 kW (302 hp) (PHEV, combined)
- Transmission: 6-speed manual; 8-speed AWF8F35/UA80E "Direct Shift" automatic; K120 CVT with physical first gear; Aisin Seiki T110 eCVT with sequential shift mode (hybrid)
- Hybrid drivetrain: Power-split (hybrid); PHEV (plug-in hybrid/Across)
- Battery: 1.6 kWh nickel–metal hydride (hybrid); 18.1 kWh lithium-ion (plug-in hybrid)
- Plug-in charging: 6.6 kW AC (Prime); V2L: 1.5 kW (Prime)

Dimensions
- Wheelbase: 2,690 mm (105.9 in)
- Length: 4,570–4,600 mm (179.9–181.1 in)
- Width: 1,855 mm (73.0 in)
- Height: 1,660 mm (65.4 in)
- Curb weight: 1,530–1,640 kg (3,373–3,616 lb); 1,680–1,720 kg (3,704–3,792 lb) (hybrid)

The fifth-generation RAV4 was unveiled at the March 2018 New York International Auto Show. The design was previewed by the FT-AC concept shown at the December 2017 Los Angeles Auto Show. It is built on the same TNGA-K (GA-K) platform as the XV70 series Camry. Both 4-cylinder petrol-powered and petrol-electric hybrid (Hybrid Synergy Drive) variants would remain available. No diesel engine option is offered for this and later generations.

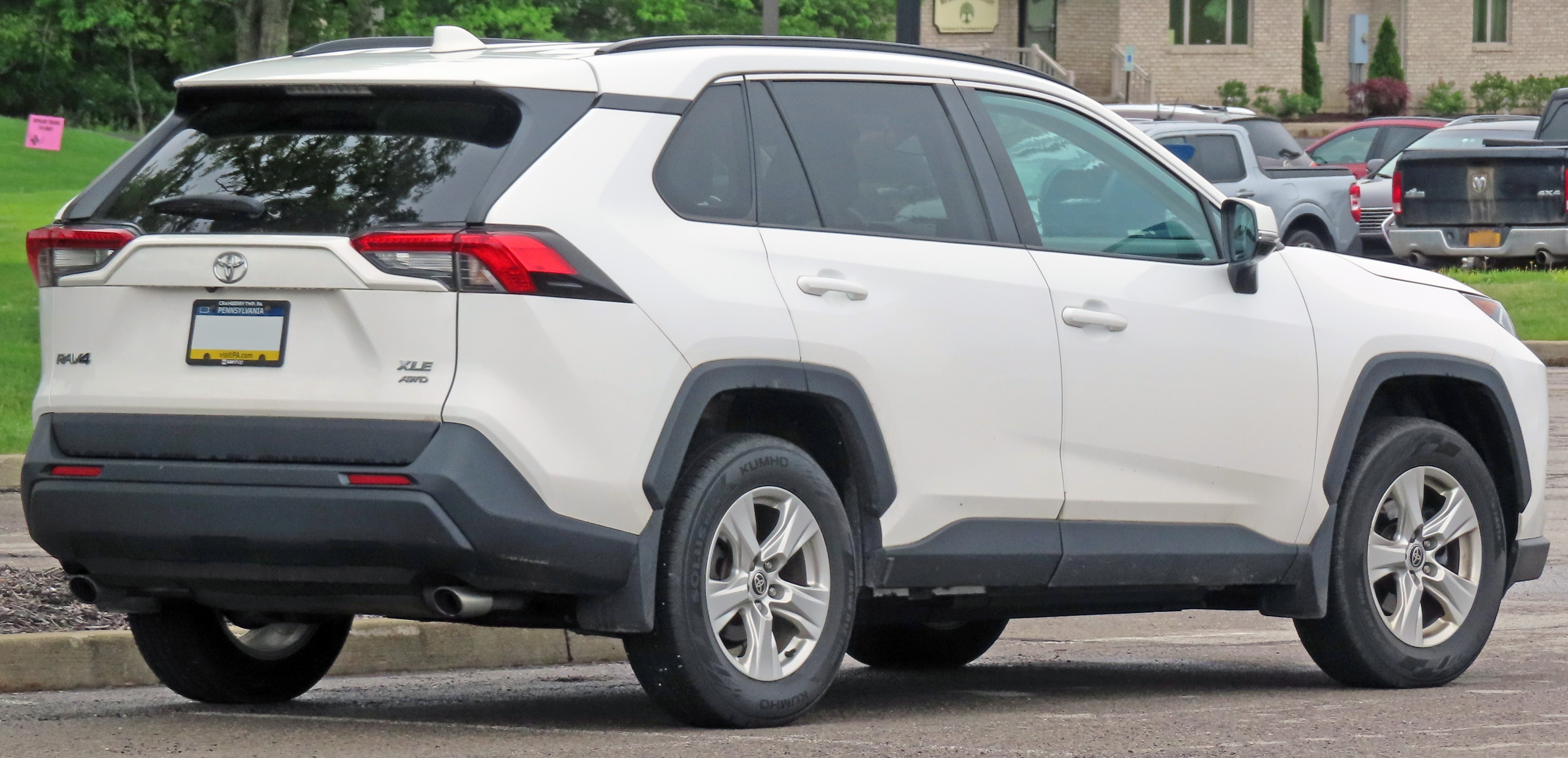
Pre-facelift Toyota RAV4 XLE AWD (AXAA54, US)

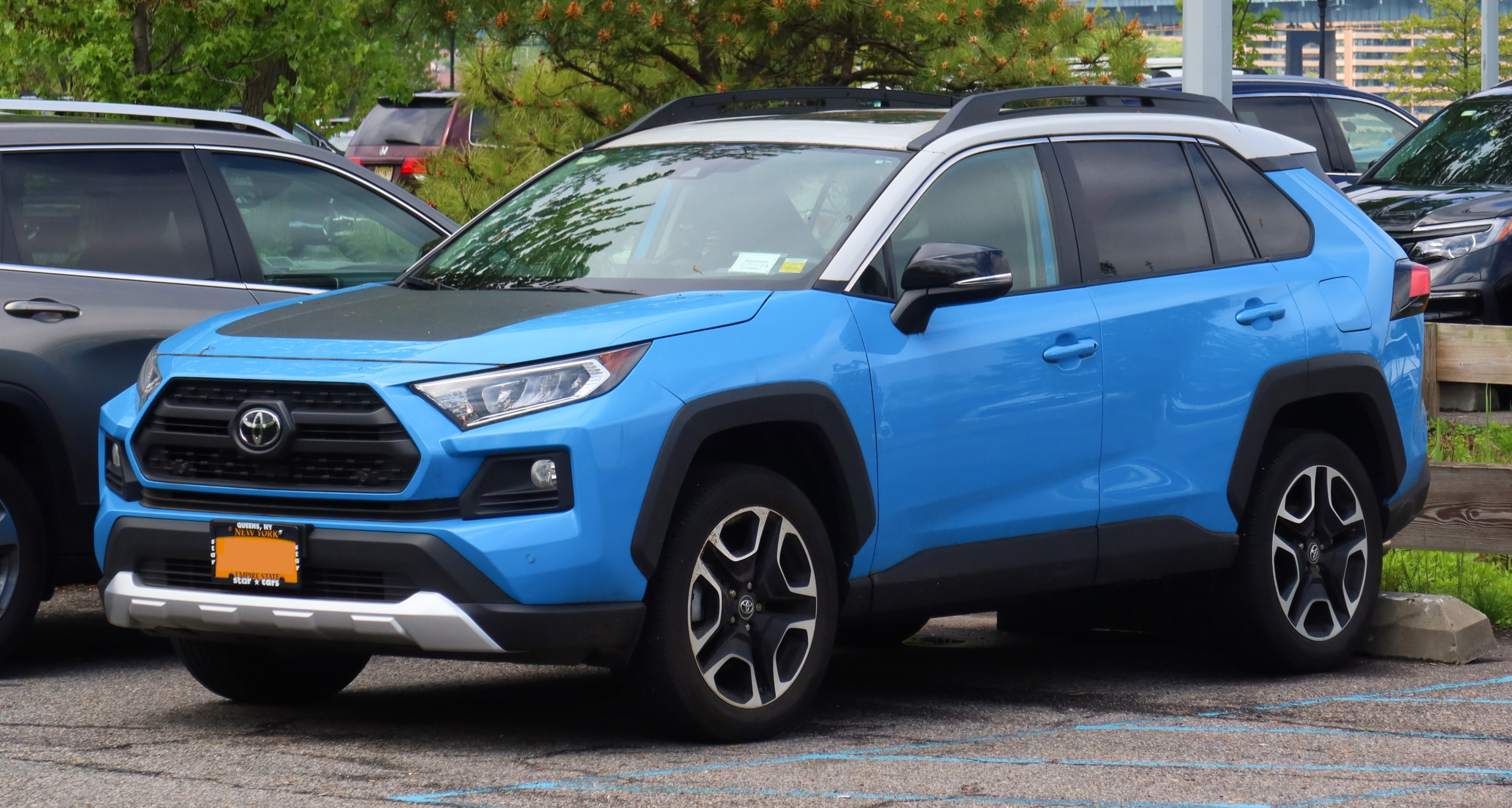
Pre-facelift RAV4 Adventure

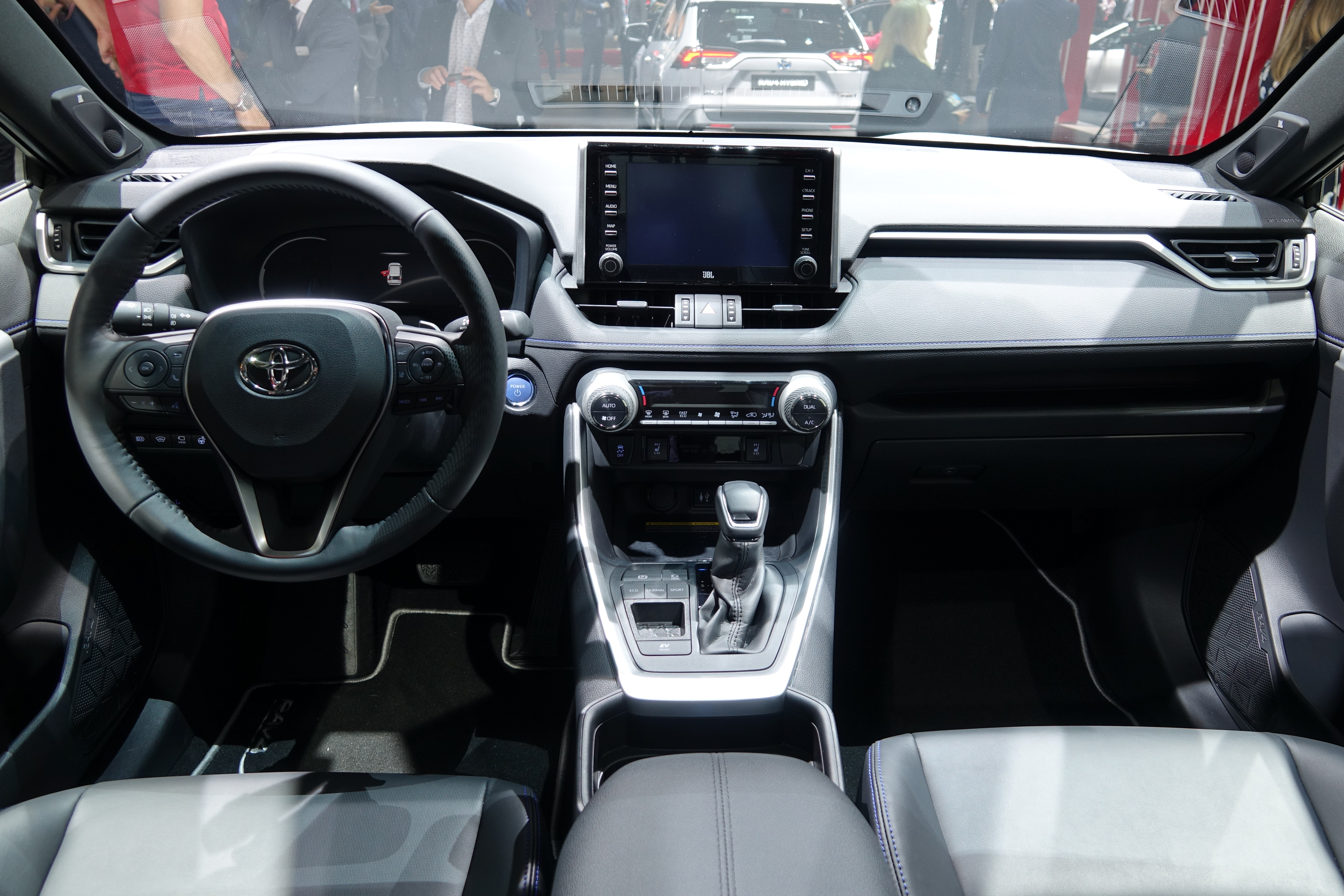
Interior

Development of the model was led by chief engineer Yoshikazu Saeki. Built on the GA-K platform, the unibody chassis of the fifth-generation RAV4 is 57 percent more rigid than the previous generation. The model incorporates a multi-link rear suspension which is claimed to provide more ideal damping for handling, less interior cabin noise, and enhanced ride comfort.

For improved forward visibility around the A-pillar, Toyota positioned the side mirrors lower on the doors. The lowered beltline and the enlarged rear quarter glass also increased the side visibility from inside the car. Forward visibility is also enhanced by the positioning of the lower instrument panel and tucked-in windshield wipers.

The fifth-generation RAV4 also introduced a newly developed four-wheel drive system, marketed as "Dynamic Torque Vectoring AWD". Claimed to be a world-first adoption, it is a torque vectoring type, which independently distributes torque to the left and right rear wheels according to driving conditions. A disconnect mechanism, marketed as "Rear Driveline Disconnect", is incorporated to transmit driving force only to the front wheels when 4WD is deemed unnecessary.

For hybrid models, all-wheel drive variants utilize the "E-Four"/"AWD-i" system. The updated system increases the total torque to the electronically driven rear wheels by 30 percent compared to the AWD system used in the previous generation. A new control system allows torque distribution to the front and rear wheels to be changed from between 100:0 to 20:80. A standard AWD system without torque vectoring is also available for petrol models.

=== Markets ===
==== Australia ====
The fifth-generation RAV4 went on sale in Australia on 8 May 2019 and is available in four trim levels: GX, GXL, Cruiser and Edge. The GX, GXL and Cruiser trims have two engine options: the 2.0 L petrol and the 2.5 L hybrid, while the Edge trim has only one engine option: the 2.5 L petrol. The GX trim is available with either 6-speed manual transmission or CVT, while the GXL and Cruiser trims as well as the GX, GXL and Cruiser hybrid variants are only available with CVT. The Edge trim is available with 8-speed automatic transmission.

==== China ====
The fifth-generation RAV4 was also launched in China on 22 November 2019 at the Guangzhou International Motor Show. It is produced and sold by FAW Toyota. Another Chinese market variant with different front and rear fascias produced and sold by GAC Toyota is called the Toyota Wildlander (Chinese: 威兰达; pinyin: Wēilándá). The PHEV version of the Wildlander was unveiled on 19 April 2021.

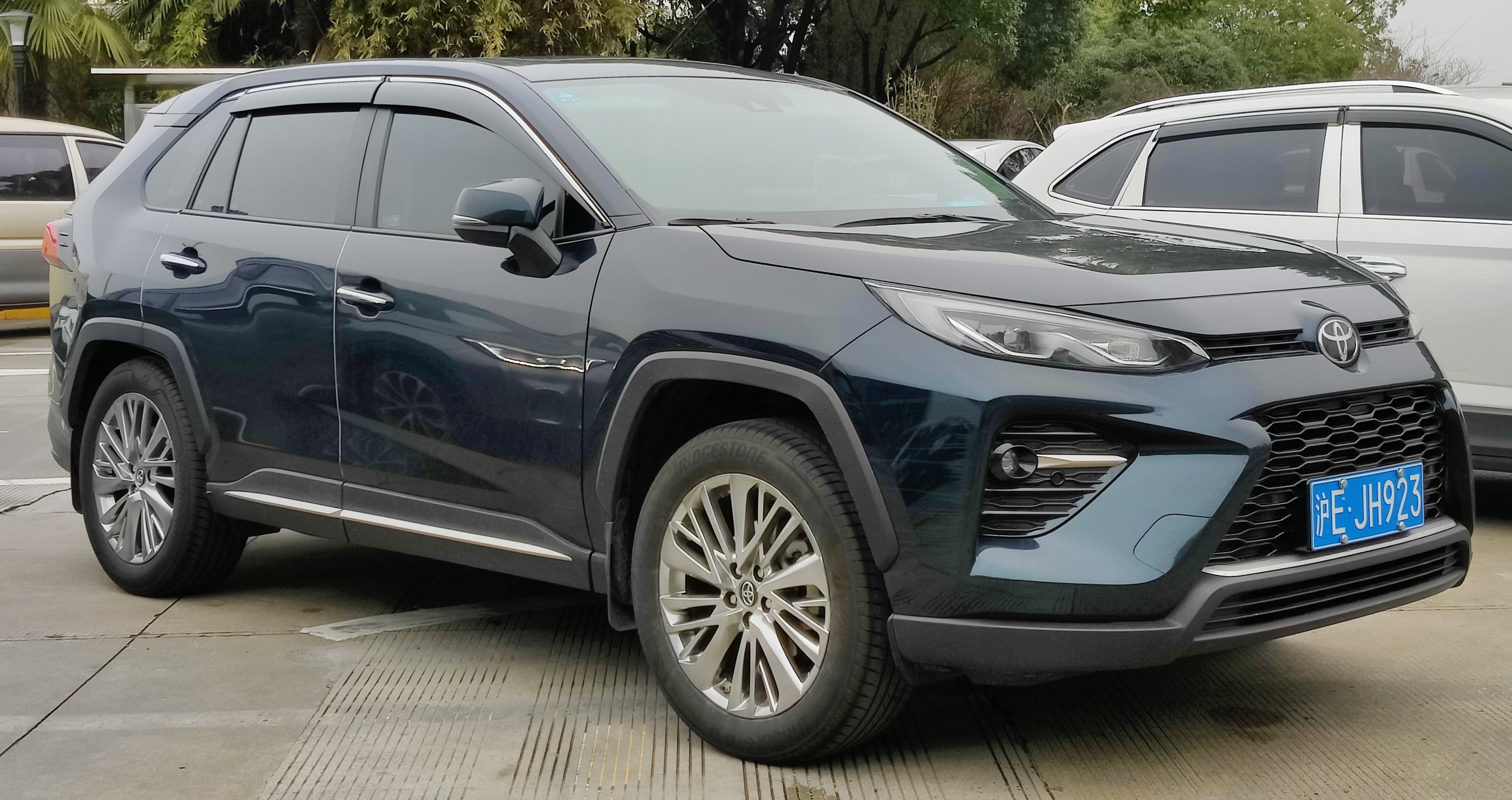
Toyota Wildlander

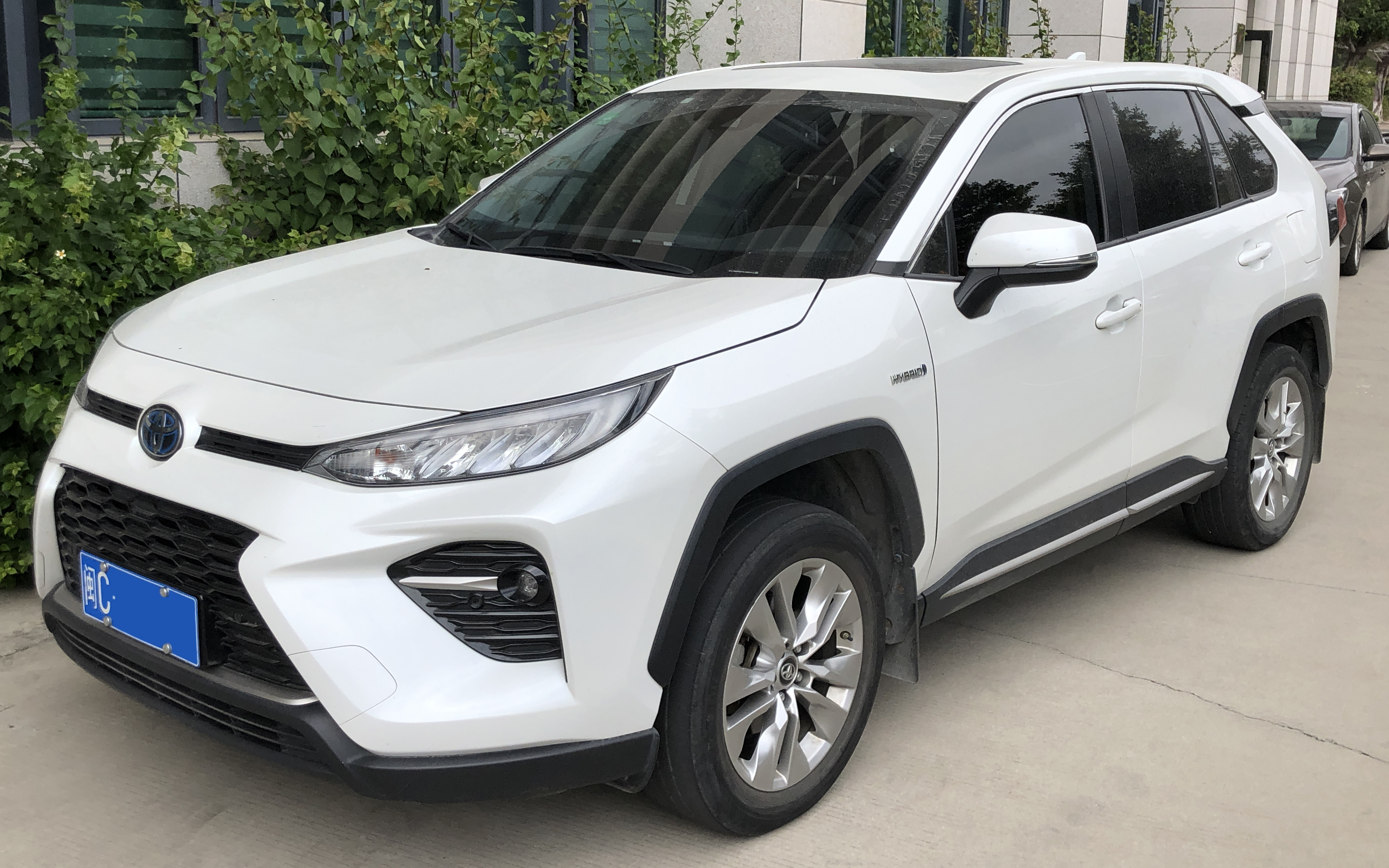
Toyota Wildlander Hybrid

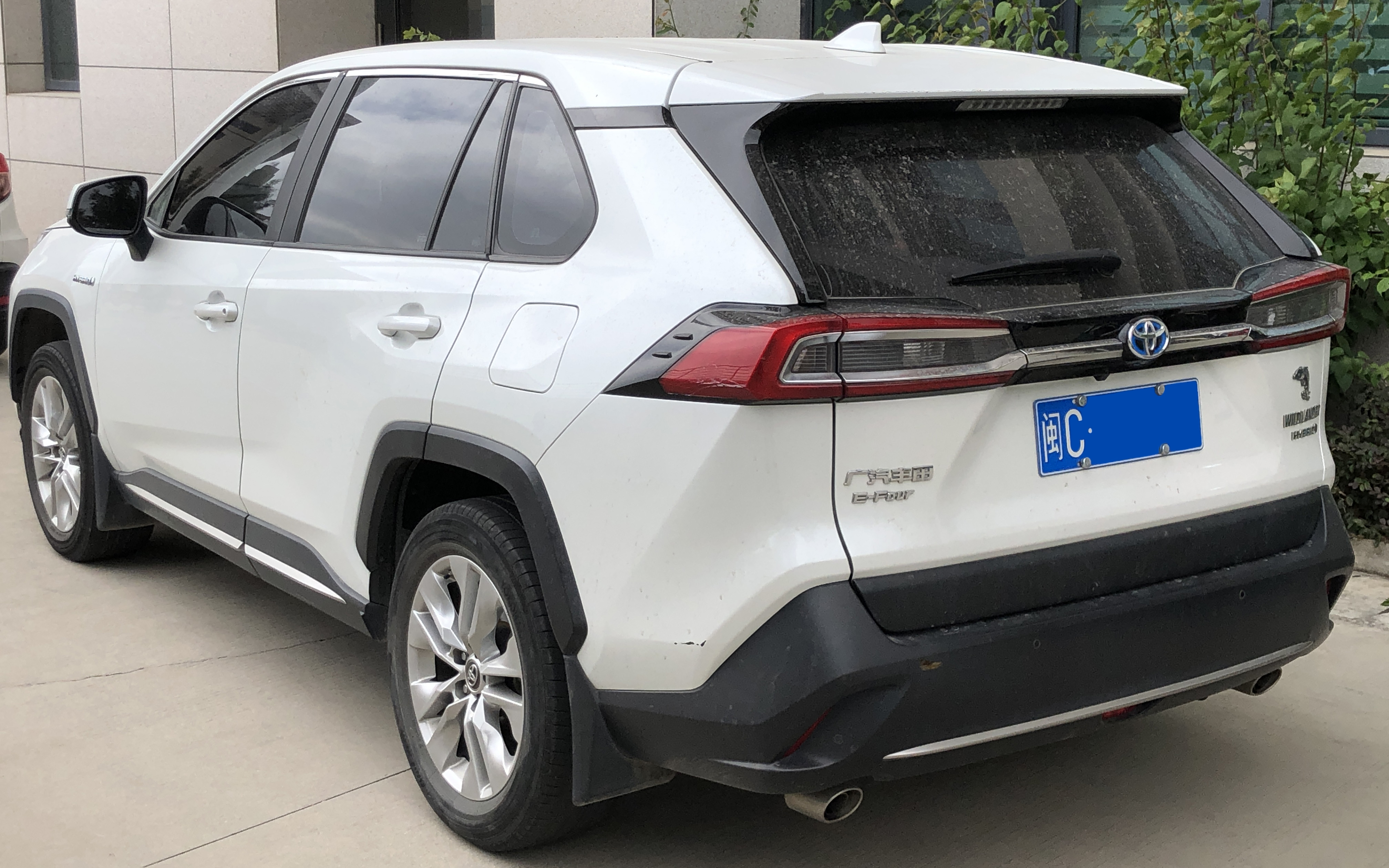
Toyota Wildlander Hybrid

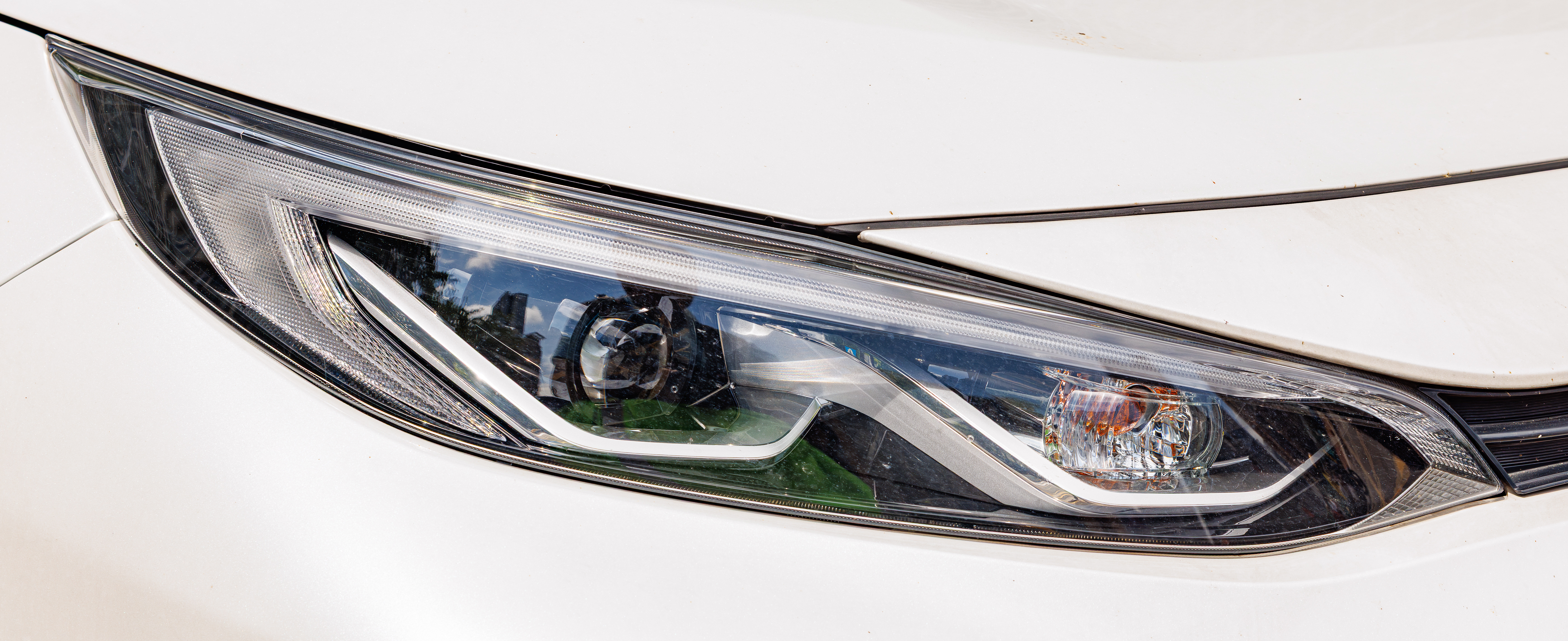
Headlamp (Wildlander; Pre-facelift)

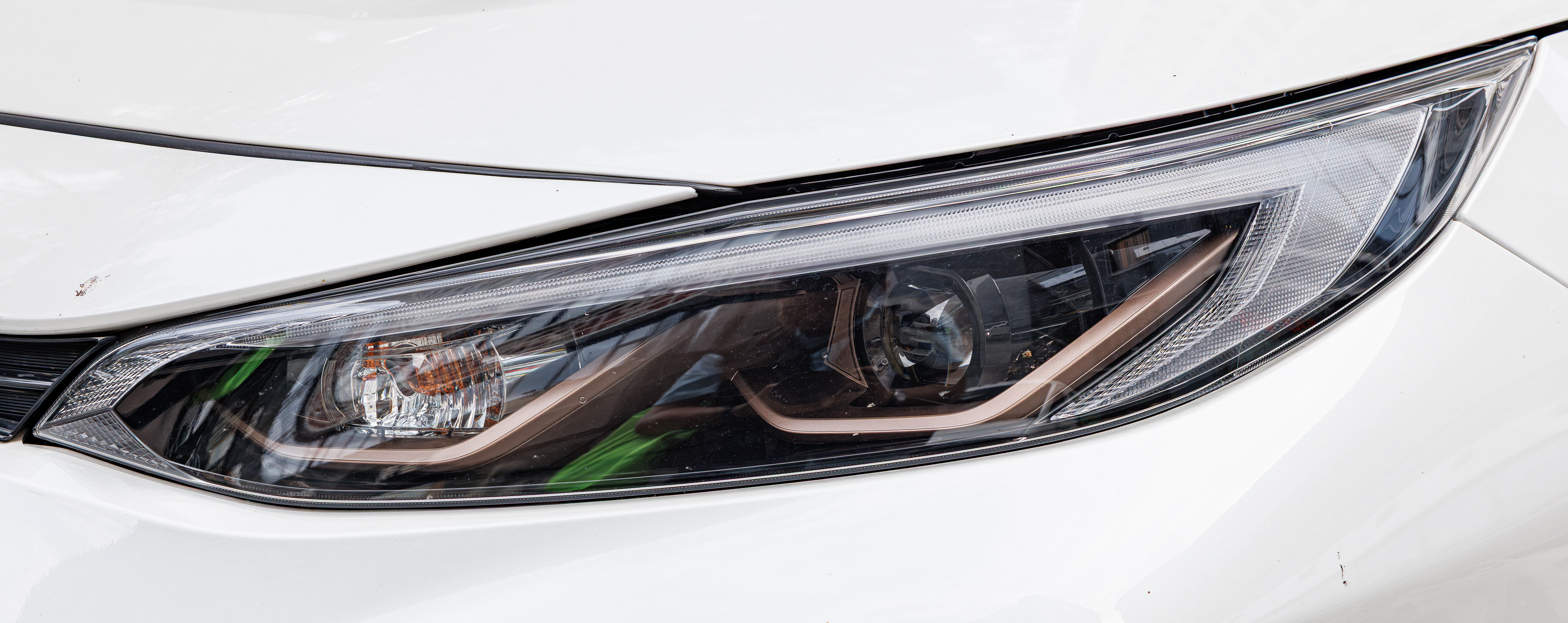
Headlamp (Wildlander; Facelift)

==== Europe ====
In the United Kingdom, the fifth-generation RAV4 is available exclusively in its hybrid version, either front-wheel drive or with four-wheel drive. It is available in four grades — Icon, Design, Excel and Dynamic. Ireland was the first market to release the Hybrid version of the fifth-generation RAV4 with delivery in late December 2018.

The GR Sport grade was added in October 2022.

==== Japan ====
The fifth-generation RAV4 was unveiled in Japan in November 2018, and went on sale in 10 April 2019. It marked the reintroduction of the RAV4 nameplate in Japan after almost three years of hiatus. Monthly sales target in Japan was set at 3,000 units, while grade levels available during launch are X, G, "Z package", Adventure. Until 2020, the model was only available in Corolla Store and Netz dealership chains.

The plug-in hybrid version called the RAV4 PHV was added in June 2020. It was offered in 2 grades: Hybrid X, and Hybrid G. The Hybrid version of the Adventure grade was added in December 2021.

The front-wheel-drive option was removed in November 2024.

==== North America ====
The RAV4 went on sale in the United States in December 2018, while the RAV4 Hybrid went on sale in March 2019. It is available in five petrol trim levels which include the LE, XLE, XLE Premium, Adventure and Limited, and four hybrid trim levels which include the LE, XLE, XSE and Limited. Both Adventure and Limited grades are equipped with Dynamic Torque Vectoring AWD. It has Multi Terrain Select providing operators an ability to maximize traction when driving on sand, mud, rock, or dirt. North American market RAV4 is equipped with a 2.5-litre petrol engine paired with an 8-speed Direct Shift automatic. A 7-inch multi-touch screen is available standard, as well as the Toyota Safety Sense 2.0.

For the North American market, the RAV4 and RAV4 Hybrid models are built in two plants in Woodstock, Ontario, while the RAV4 Hybrid is also produced in Georgetown, Kentucky. The RAV4 Prime plug-in hybrid is built at Toyota Industries' Nagakusa plant in Japan.

In 2019, for the 2020 model year, the TRD Off-Road trim level was added to the lineup, making a total of ten trim levels available. In 2020, for the 2021 model year the XLE Premium Hybrid trim level is added to the lineup. Toyota also added new TRD-stamped stainless steel front skid plate for the TRD Off-Road. The SE Hybrid grade is added in 2021 for the 2022 model year. The Woodland Edition model was added in 2022 for the 2023 model year with standard hybrid powertrain, TRD bronze-coloured wheels, and roof rails. For the 2023 model year, all RAV4 trims also received upgrade to Toyota Safety Sense 2.5.

In 2024, for the 2025 model year, the Adventure and TRD Off-Road trim levels were discontinued.

==== Saudi Arabia ====
In the Kingdom of Saudi Arabia, the fifth-generation RAV4 was launched in April 2019, with availability in eight exterior colour choices and three interior (light grey, beige, and black). It is equipped with 17 in (43 cm) or 18 in (46 cm) alloy wheels, and the hybrid version has a fuel efficiency of 22.2 km/l (62.7 mpg_{‑imp}; 52.2 mpg_{‑US}).

==== South Africa ====
The fifth-generation RAV4 has been available in South Africa since March 2019 in five variants: 2.0 GX 2WD, 2.0 GX CVT 2WD, 2.0 GX-R CVT AWD, 2.5 VX CVT 2WD and 2.5 VX AT AWD, with the 2.5 GX Hybrid available since September 2021. The 2.0 GX 2WD trim is also available with 6-speed manual transmission. As of March 2022, the GX Hybrid was dropped in favour of the facelifted GX-R and VX e-Four Hybrids.

==== Southeast Asia ====
The fifth-generation RAV4 was also launched in Singapore on 10 January 2019 at the Singapore Motorshow and in the Philippines on 8 February 2019.

In Malaysia, the fifth-generation RAV4 was launched in the country on 18 June 2020 and available in two engine options, the 2.0 M20A-FKS and 2.5 A25A-FKS, both in single trim only. As of August 2020, the 2.0-litre engine option was dropped.

In Indonesia, the fifth-generation RAV4 was unveiled at the 2nd Gaikindo Jakarta Auto Week on 10 March 2023, with sales commencing later at the 30th Gaikindo Indonesia International Auto Show on 10 August 2023. Imported from Japan, it is offered in a single grade level (GR Sport) and only powered by the 2.5-litre A25A-FXS plug-in hybrid powertrain.

=== RAV4 Hybrid ===
A hybrid variant of the RAV4 was announced available alongside the standard petrol variant and made available in March 2019. It comes standard with four-wheel drive and the hybrid system uses a 1.6 kWh nickel-metal-hydride battery pack (model AHAH54L) or 0.9 kWh lithium-ion battery pack (model AHAL54L). Fuel economy is estimated by the EPA in to be:

- city: 5.7 L/100 km; 49 mpg_{‑imp} (41 mpg_{‑US})
- highway: 6.4 L/100 km; 44 mpg_{‑imp} (37 mpg_{‑US})
- combined: 6.0 L/100 km; 47 mpg_{‑imp} (39 mpg_{‑US}).
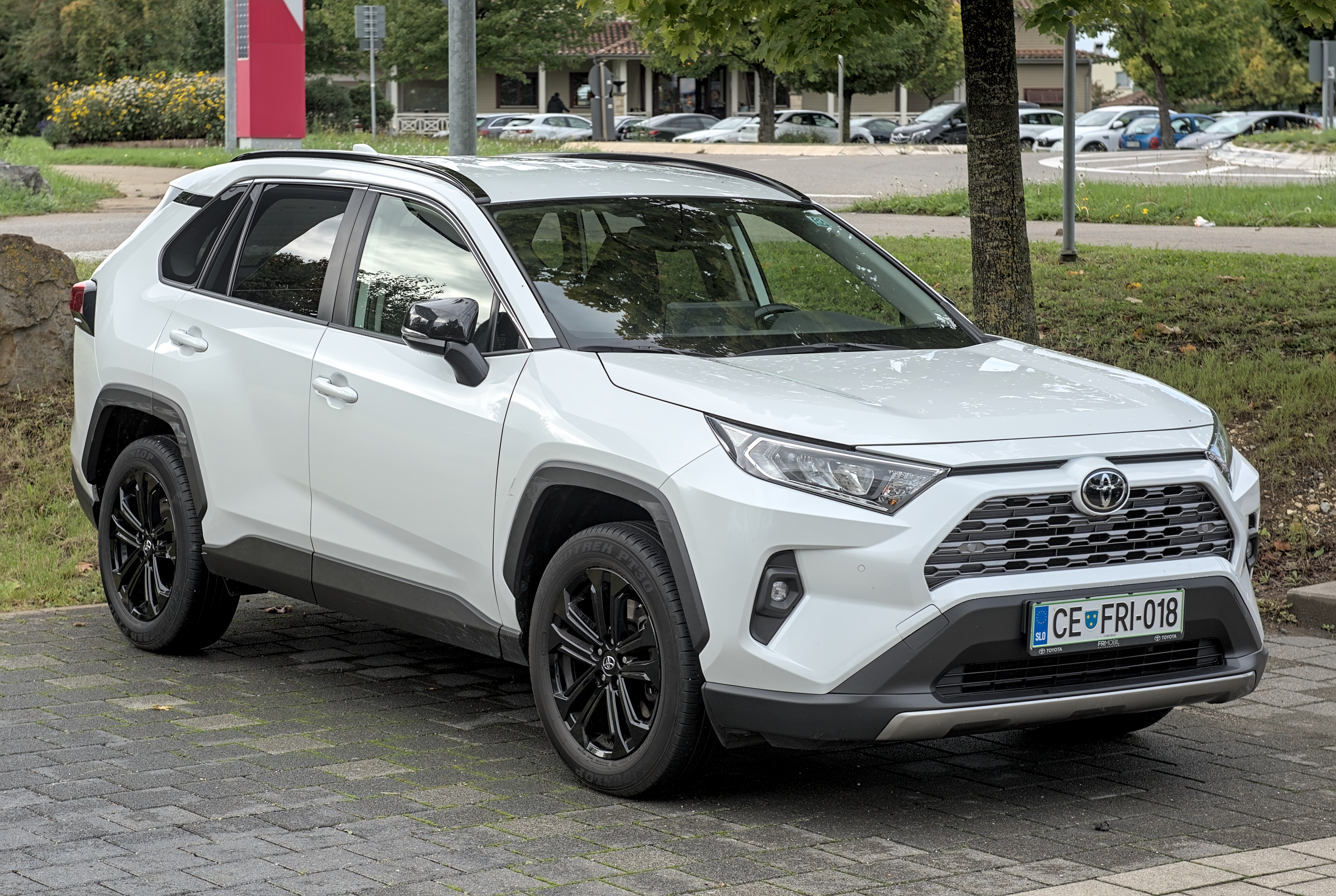
Pre-facelift RAV4 Hybrid

=== Plug-in hybrid electric ===
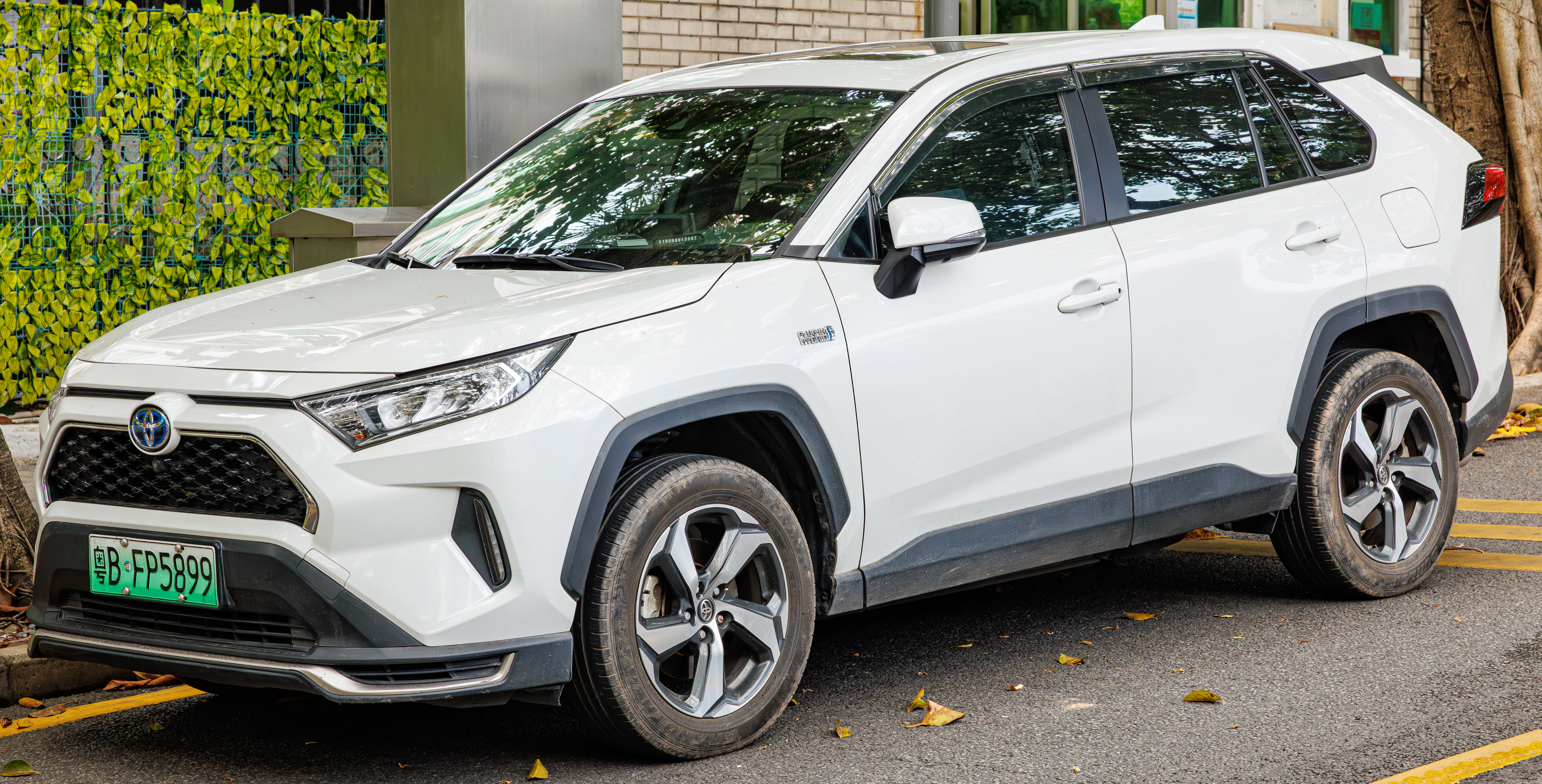

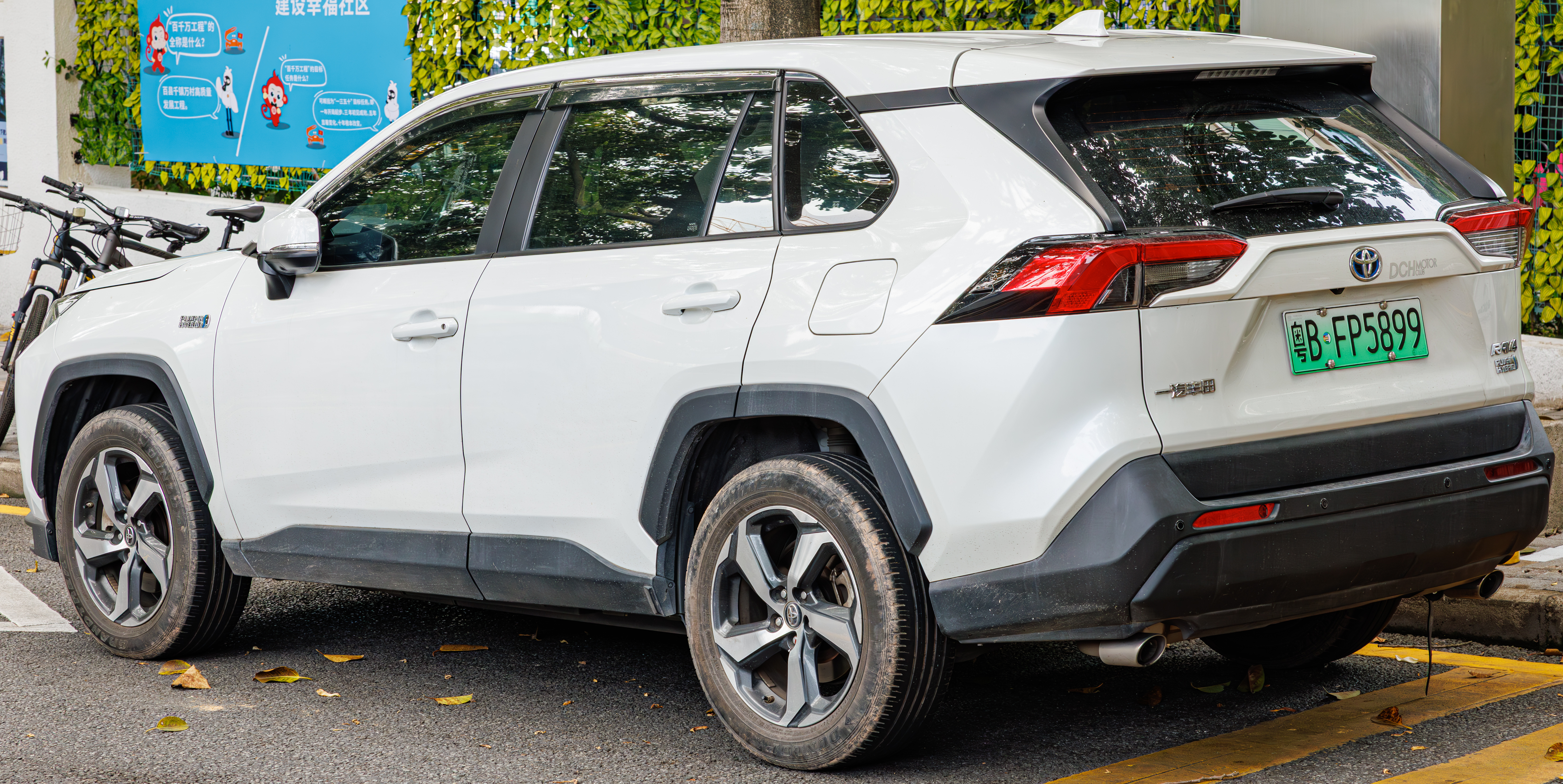
Pre-facelift Toyota RAV4 Prime

A plug-in hybrid electric (PHEV) variant of the RAV4 was unveiled at the December 2019 Los Angeles Auto Show. The vehicle, called the RAV4 PHEV (RAV4 Prime in North America until model year 2025), is powered by a differently-tuned 2.5-litre A25A-FXS engine with the same power output as the standard hybrid version but with uprated torque to 228 N⋅m (168 lb⋅ft) at 2,800 rpm. It has a total power output of 225 kW (302 hp), which is 62 kW (83 hp) higher than the regular hybrid version. The RAV4 PHEV has a claimed acceleration from 0–60 mph (0–97 km/h) in 5.8 seconds and 0–100 km/h (0–62 mph) in 6.2 seconds, which, at the time of its introduction, made it the second quickest acceleration time in Toyota's lineup after the GR Supra sports car.

The sales have begun in Japan since 8 June 2020, initially sold as the RAV4 PHV. The "PHV" nameplate was later dropped in October 2022.

In October 2022, the RAV4 PHV was renamed to RAV4 Z.

In 2024, for the 2025 model year, the RAV4 Prime was renamed to RAV4 Plug-in Hybrid for the North American market.

=== 2021 facelift ===
In September 2021 (for the 2022 model year) Toyota revealed the updated RAV4 with new LED projector type headlights, alloy wheels which can be had in either silver or black, USB-C charging ports, while the European market gains the new Adventure variant which has been offered in other markets like Japan, United States and Australia. Plug-in hybrids are still available with up to 306 PS and it has a claimed all-EV range of 75 km (47 miles). In 2022 (for the 2023 model year) Toyota upgraded the infotainment system to a new unit with their newest software, which included adding support for Apple CarPlay and Android Auto.

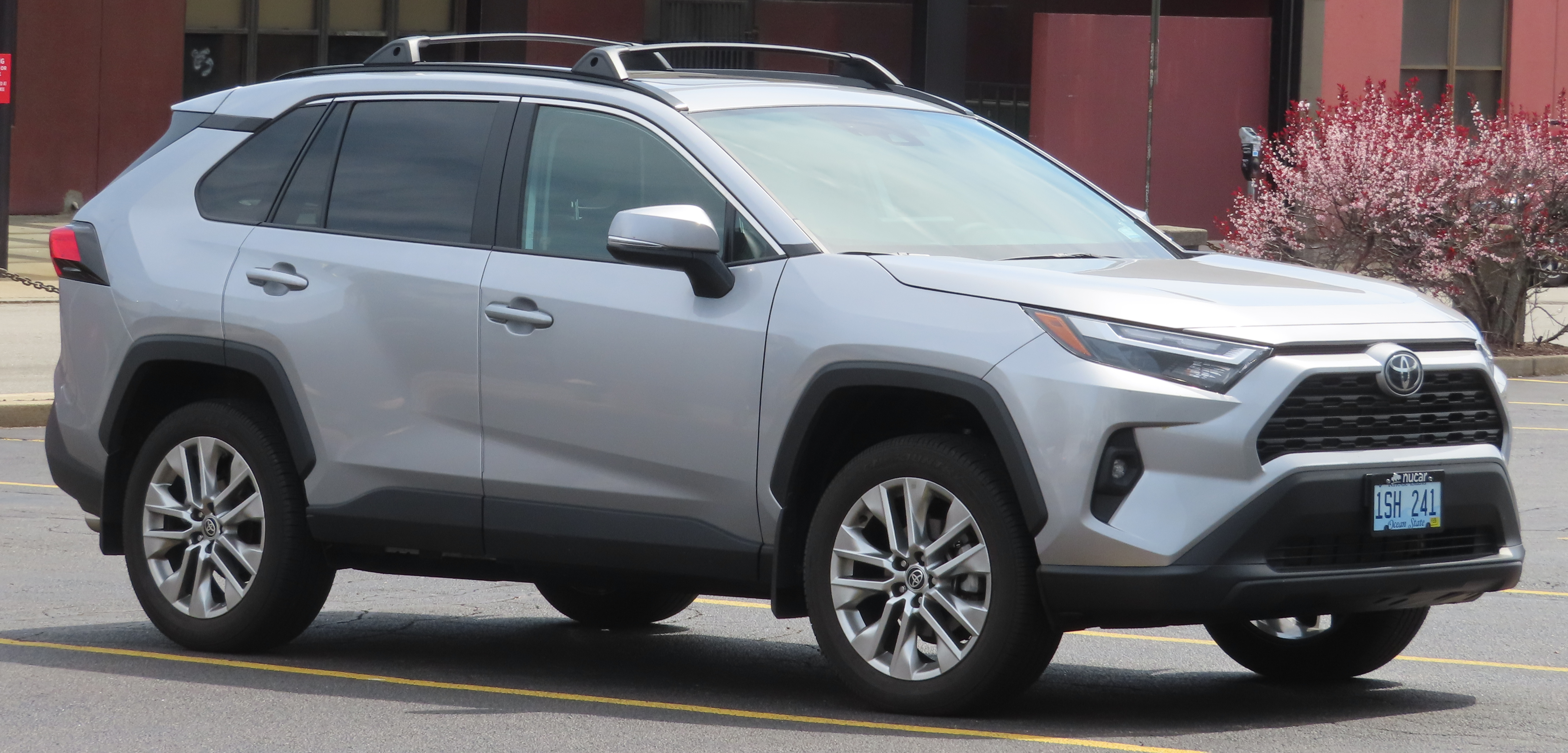
Facelift RAV4 XLE (AXAA54, US)

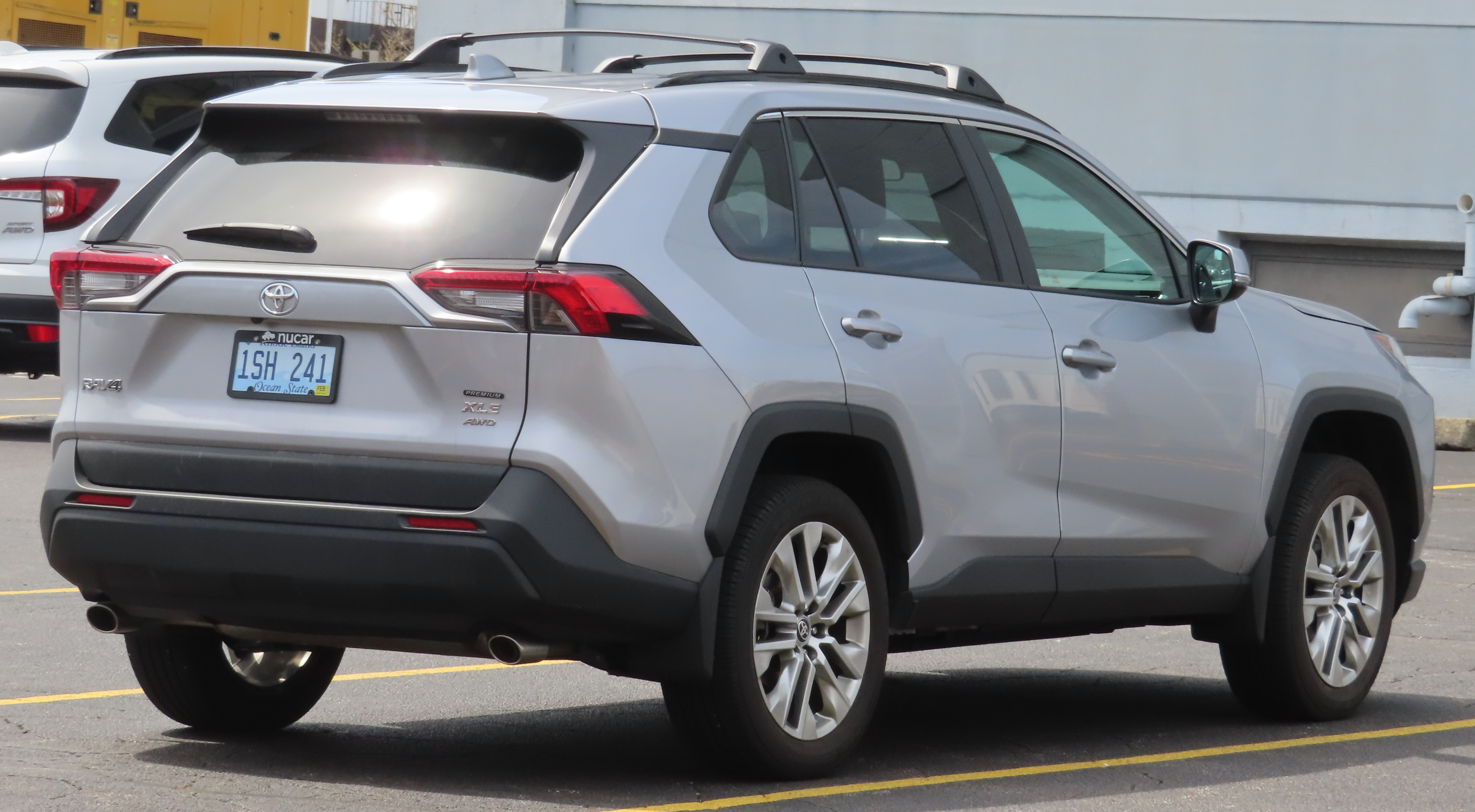
Facelift RAV4 XLE (AXAA54, US)

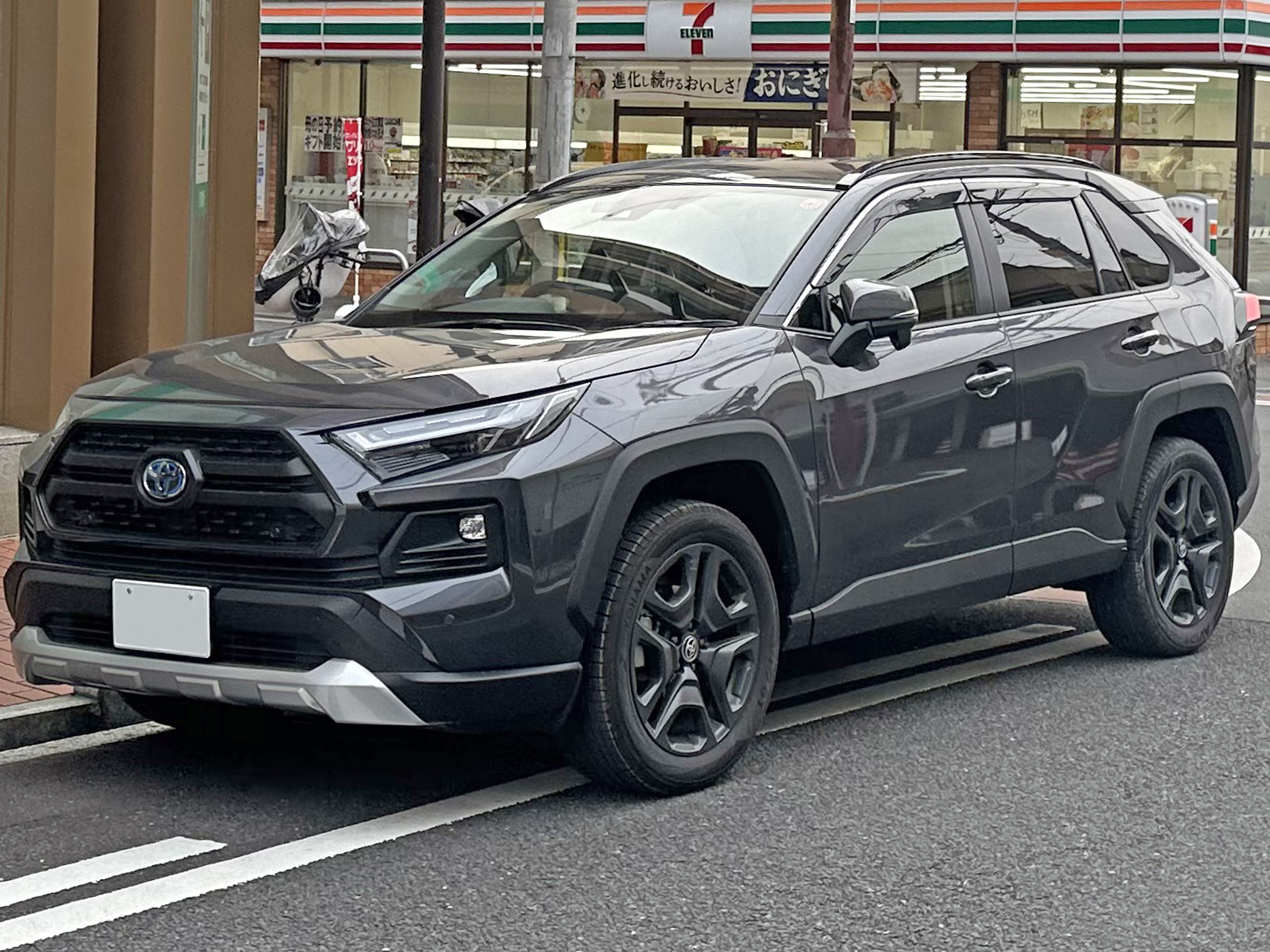
Facelift RAV4 Hybrid Adventure (AXAH54, Japan)

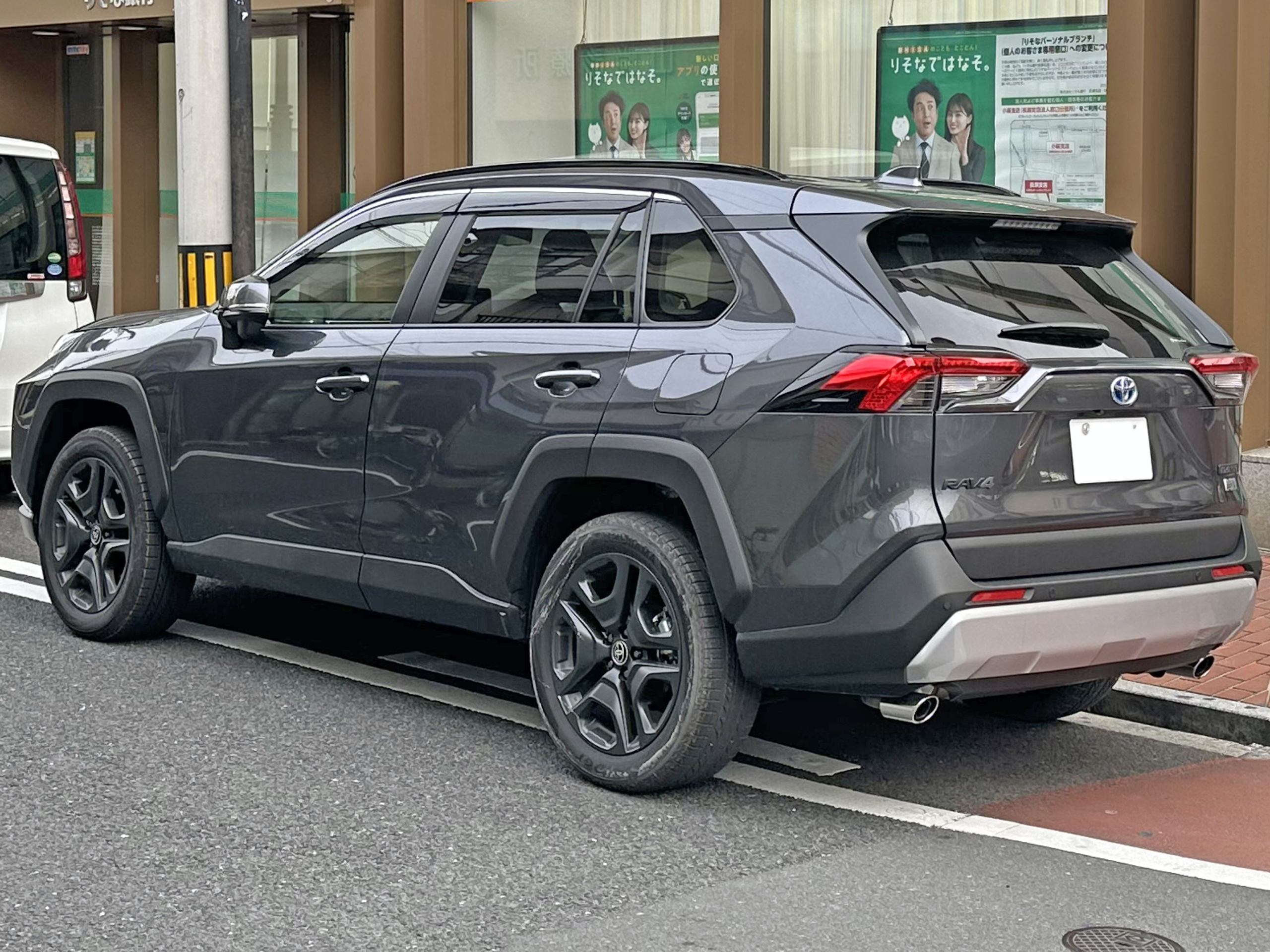
Facelift RAV4 Adventure (AXAH54, Japan)

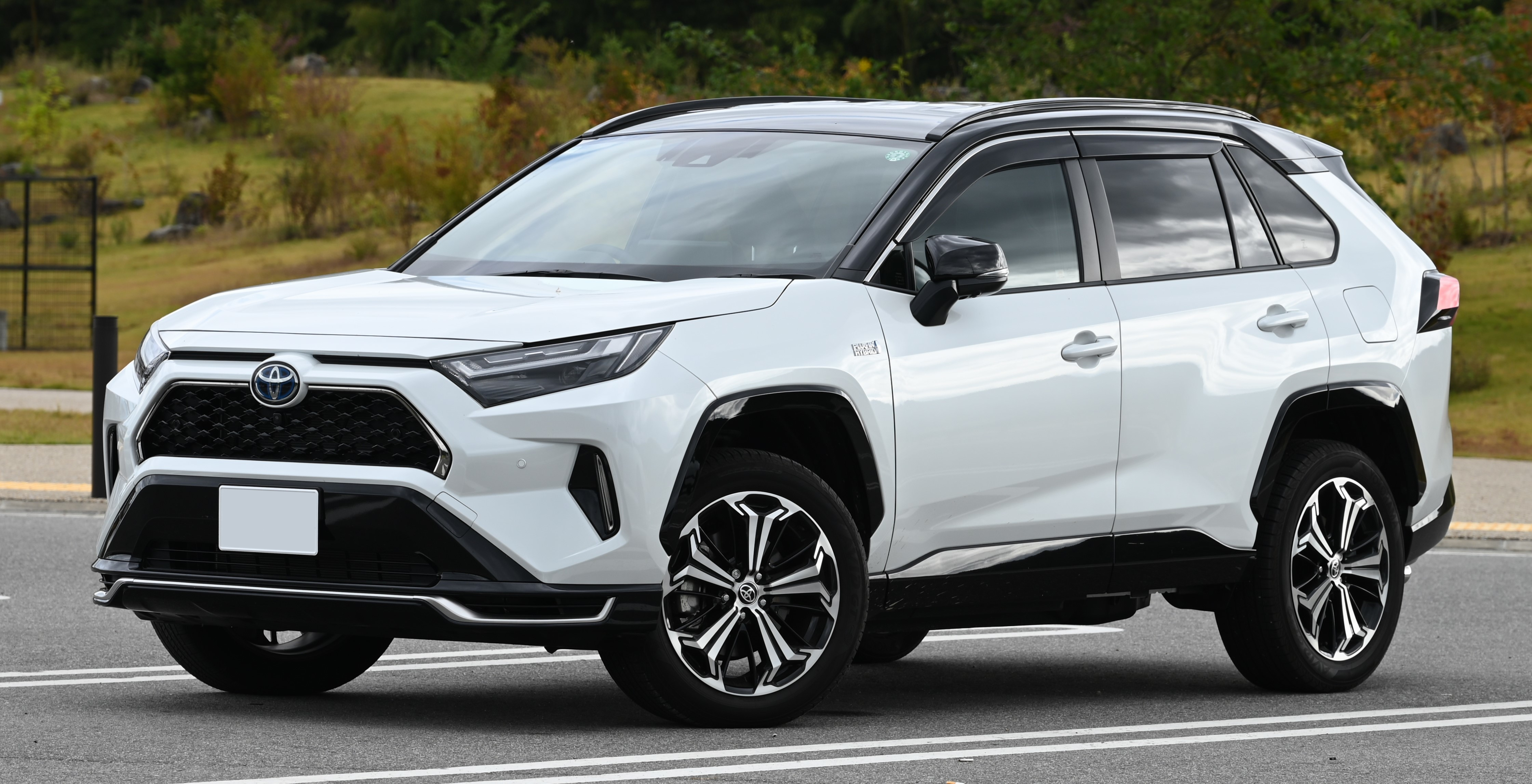
Facelift RAV4 PHEV (AXAP54, Japan)

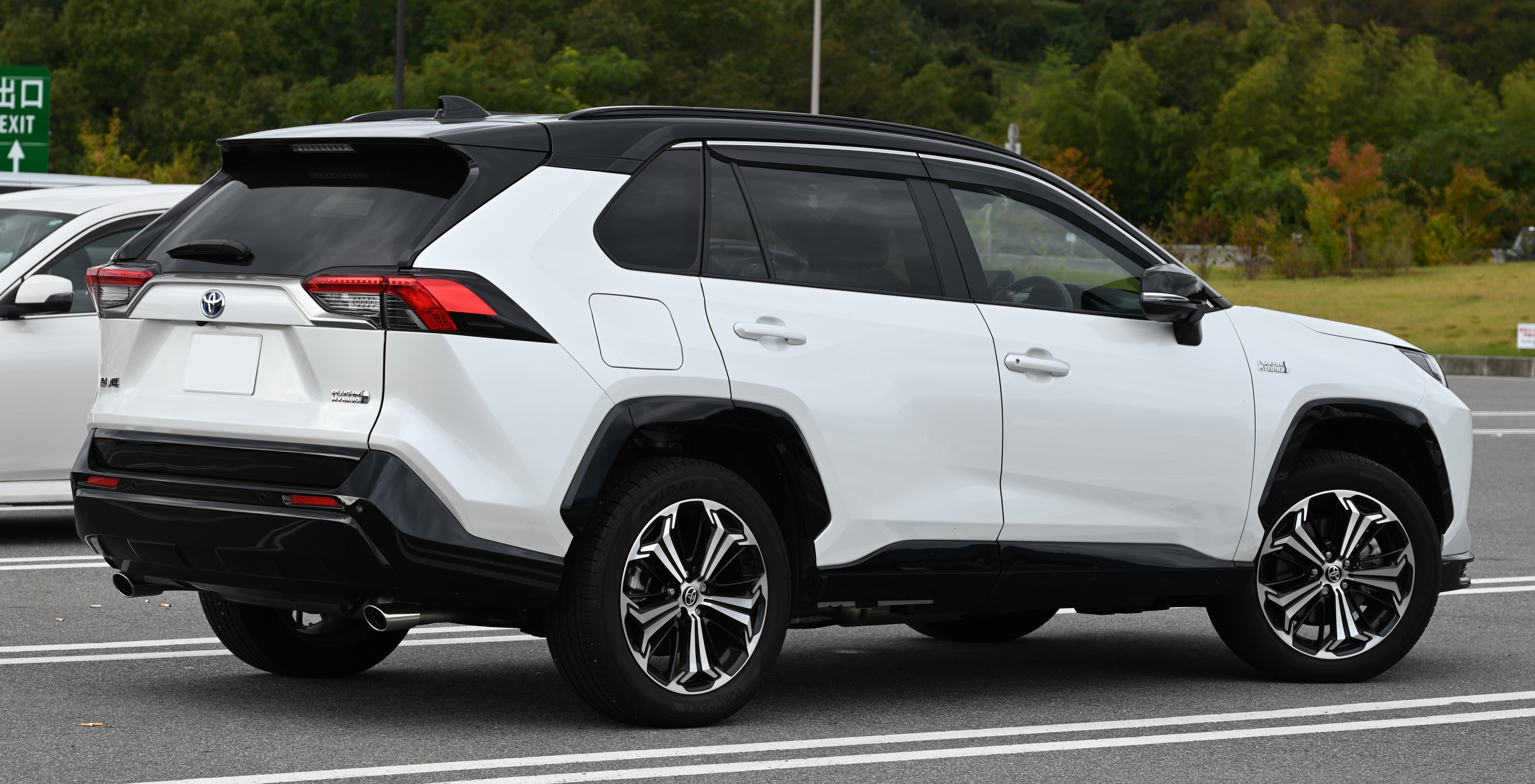
Facelift RAV4 PHEV (AXAP54, Japan)

==== RAV4 GR Sport ====
In October 2022, the RAV4 GR Sport was launched in Europe with a firmer suspension, a sportier look and new 19-inch wheels.

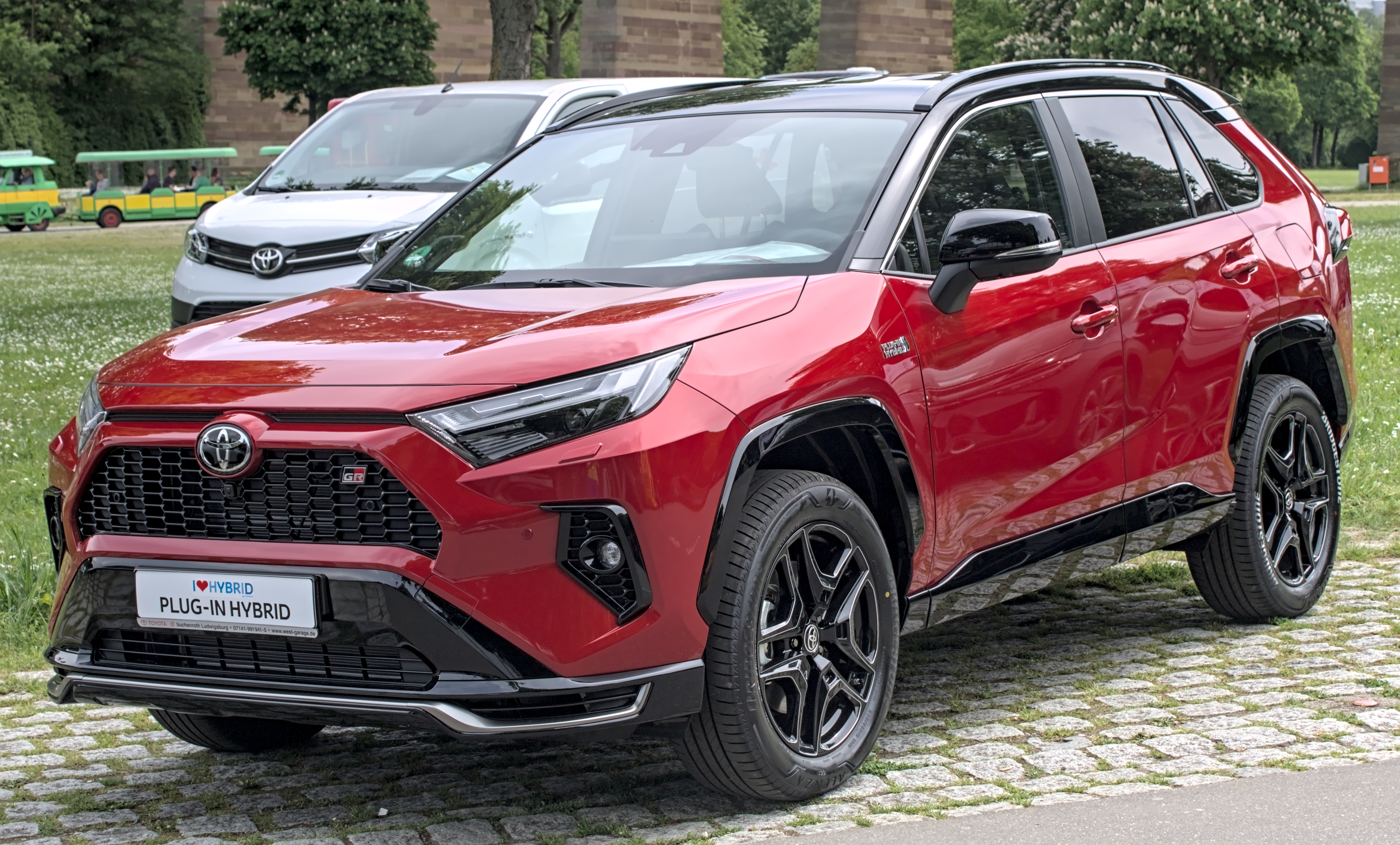
2023 Toyota RAV4 PHEV GR Sport (Europe)

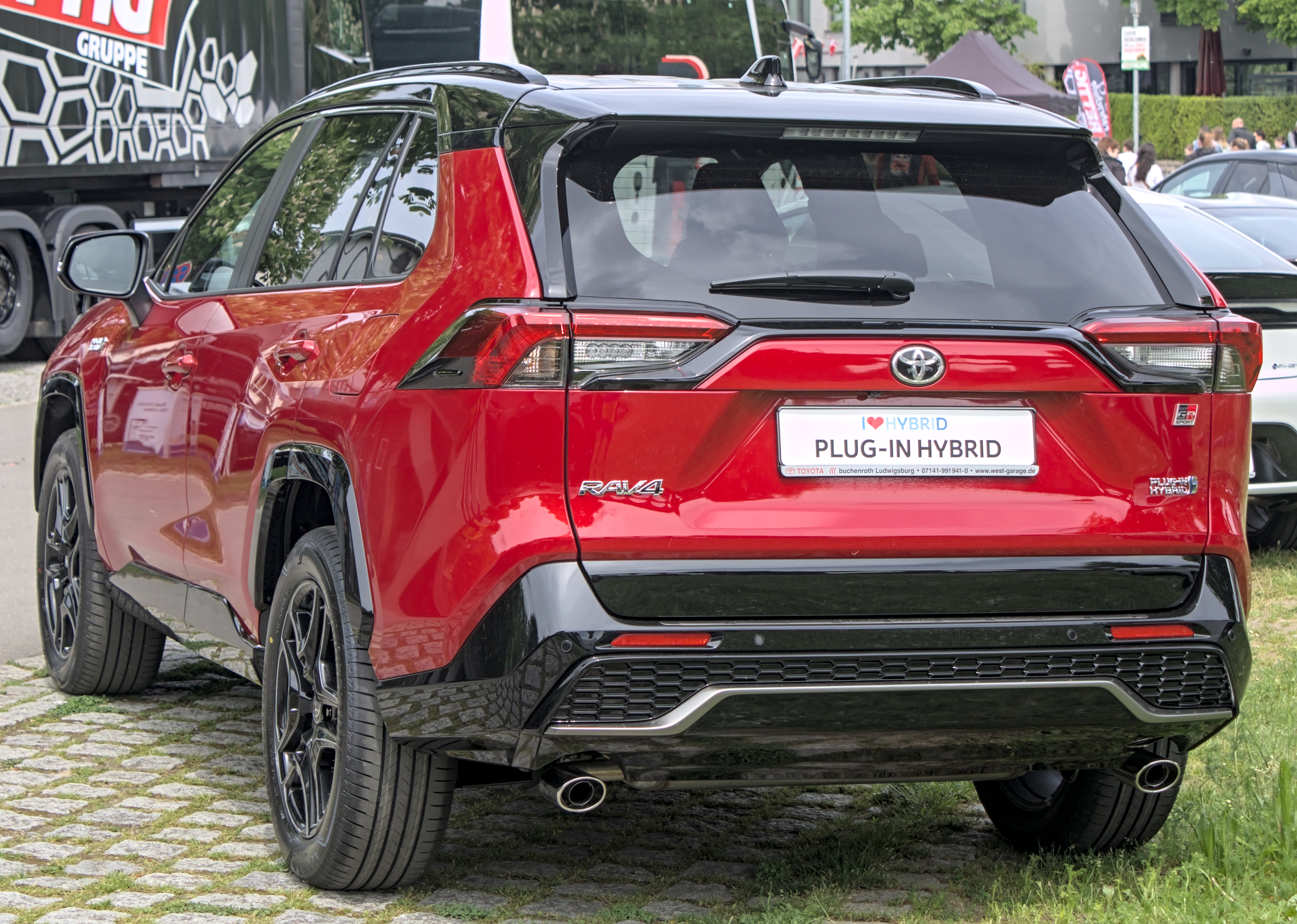
Rear view of RAV4 PHEV GR Sport (Europe)

=== Suzuki Across ===
A Suzuki-badged version of the RAV4 PHEV called Suzuki Across was introduced in July 2020, exclusively for the European market. The model was introduced to help Suzuki meet fleet-wide average CO_{2} emission targets in the European Union in 2021, as the Across offers a low 22 g/km (1.2 oz/mi) CO_{2} emission figure. The Suzuki variant receives slim LED headlights, which appear to be identical to the Chinese market Toyota Wildlander, and a rounder front grille that differentiates the Across from the Toyota RAV4.

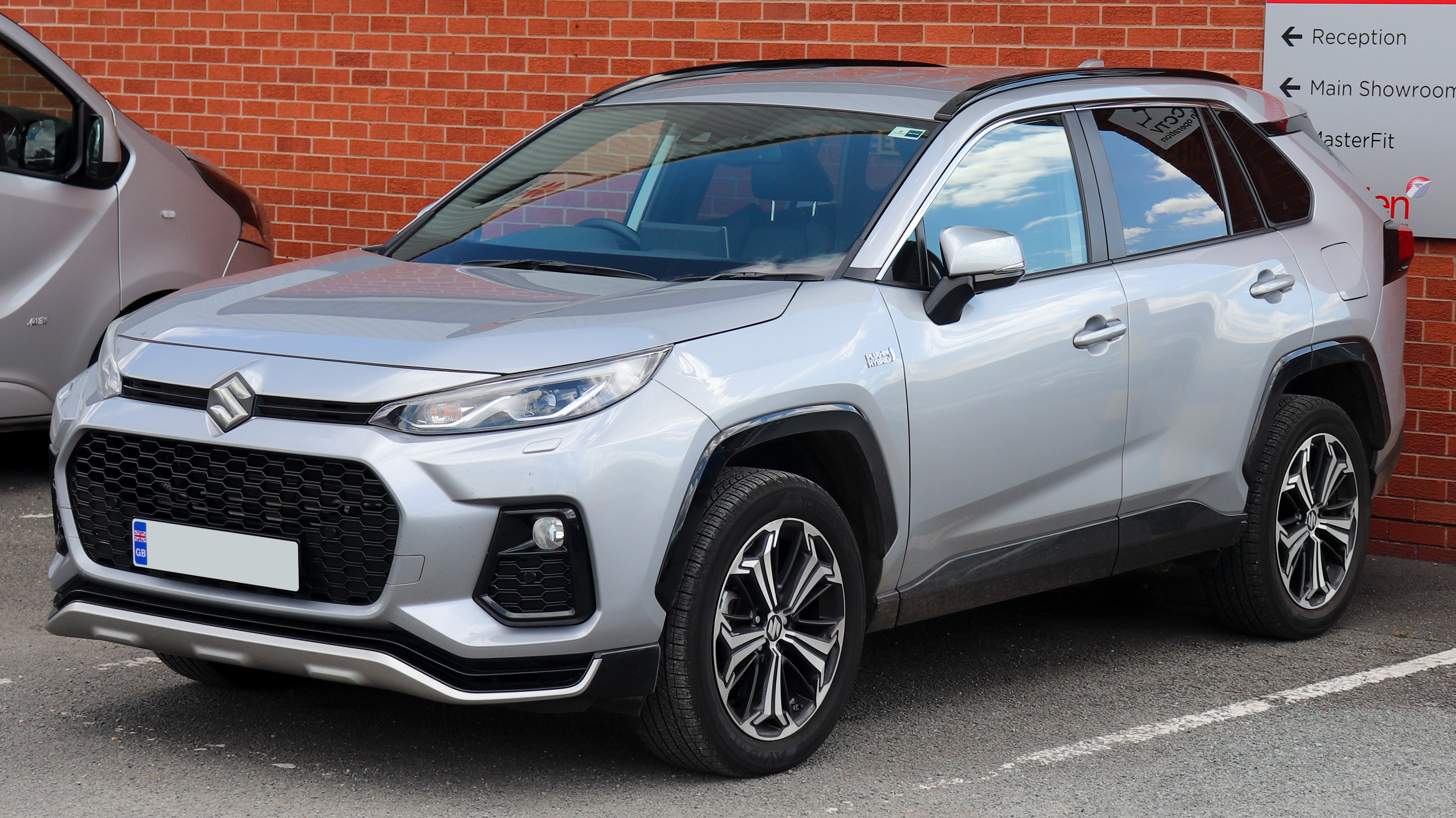
2020 Suzuki Across (UK)

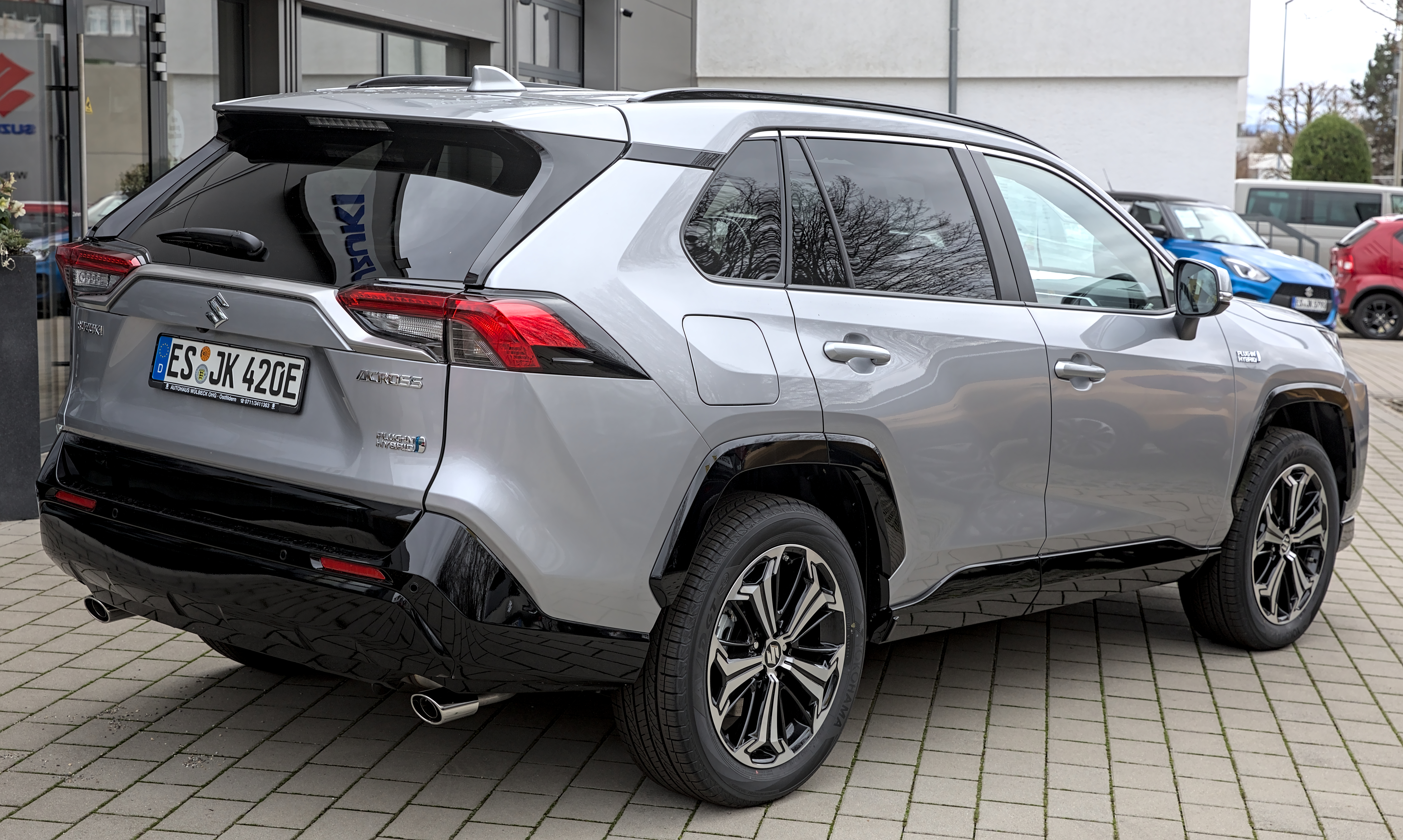
Rear view

==== 2022 update ====
The Suzuki Across received a minor update in November 2022, receiving the new touchscreen infotainment and digital instrument cluster from the facelifted Toyota RAV4.

=== Mitsuoka Buddy ===
An aftermarket modified version of the RAV4, the Mitsuoka Buddy, made its debut in October 2020 for Japan only. The front fascia harkens back to the Chevrolet K5 Blazer and the rear is similar to the Cadillac cars of the 1970s. Engine options are 2.0-litre petrol and 2.5-litre hybrid.

Production was discontinued in September 2024. However, the Buddy was re-released in October 2025. Available in sole Hybrid DX variant, sales are limited to 150 units.

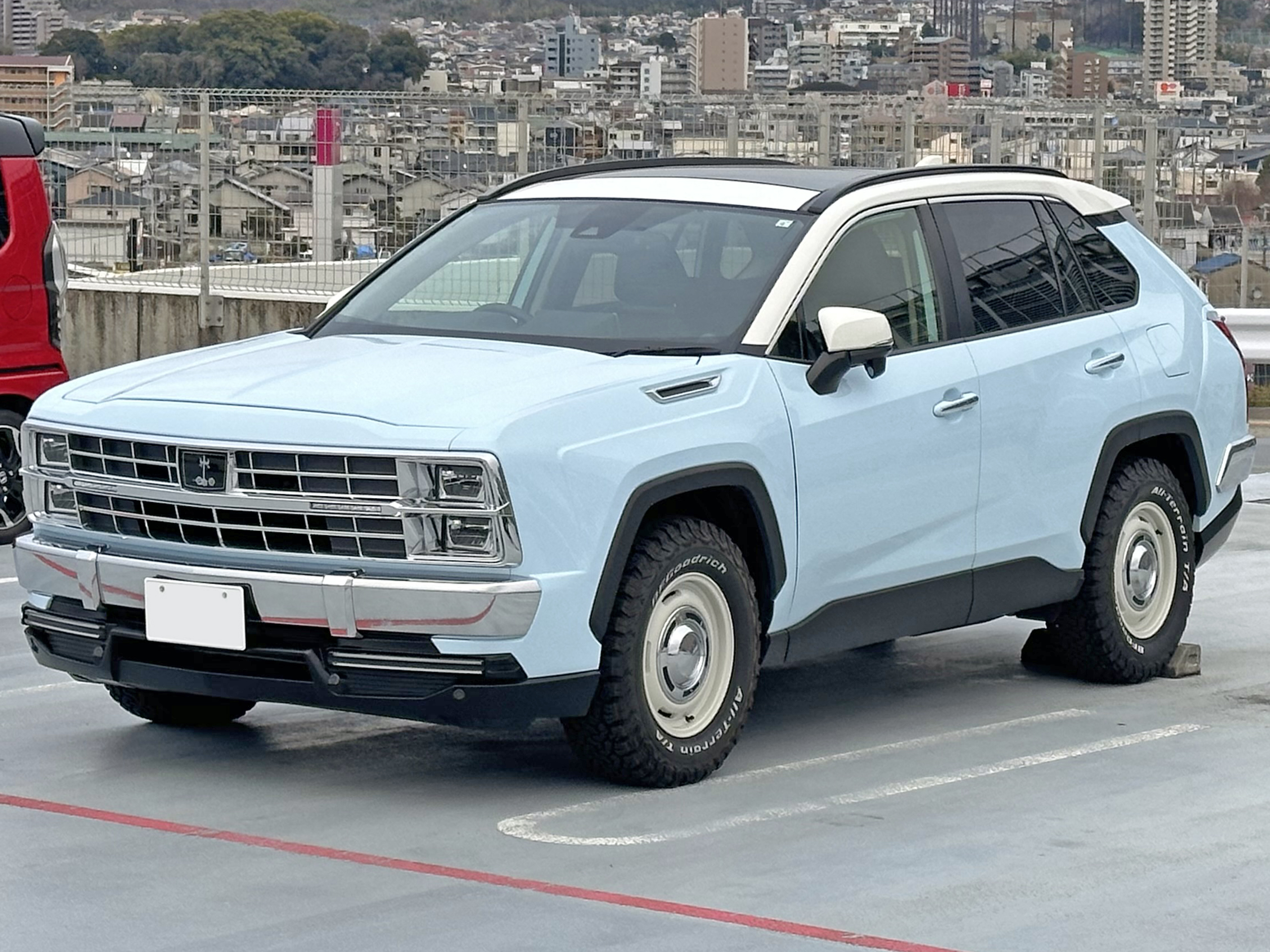
2023 Mitsuoka Buddy (Japan)

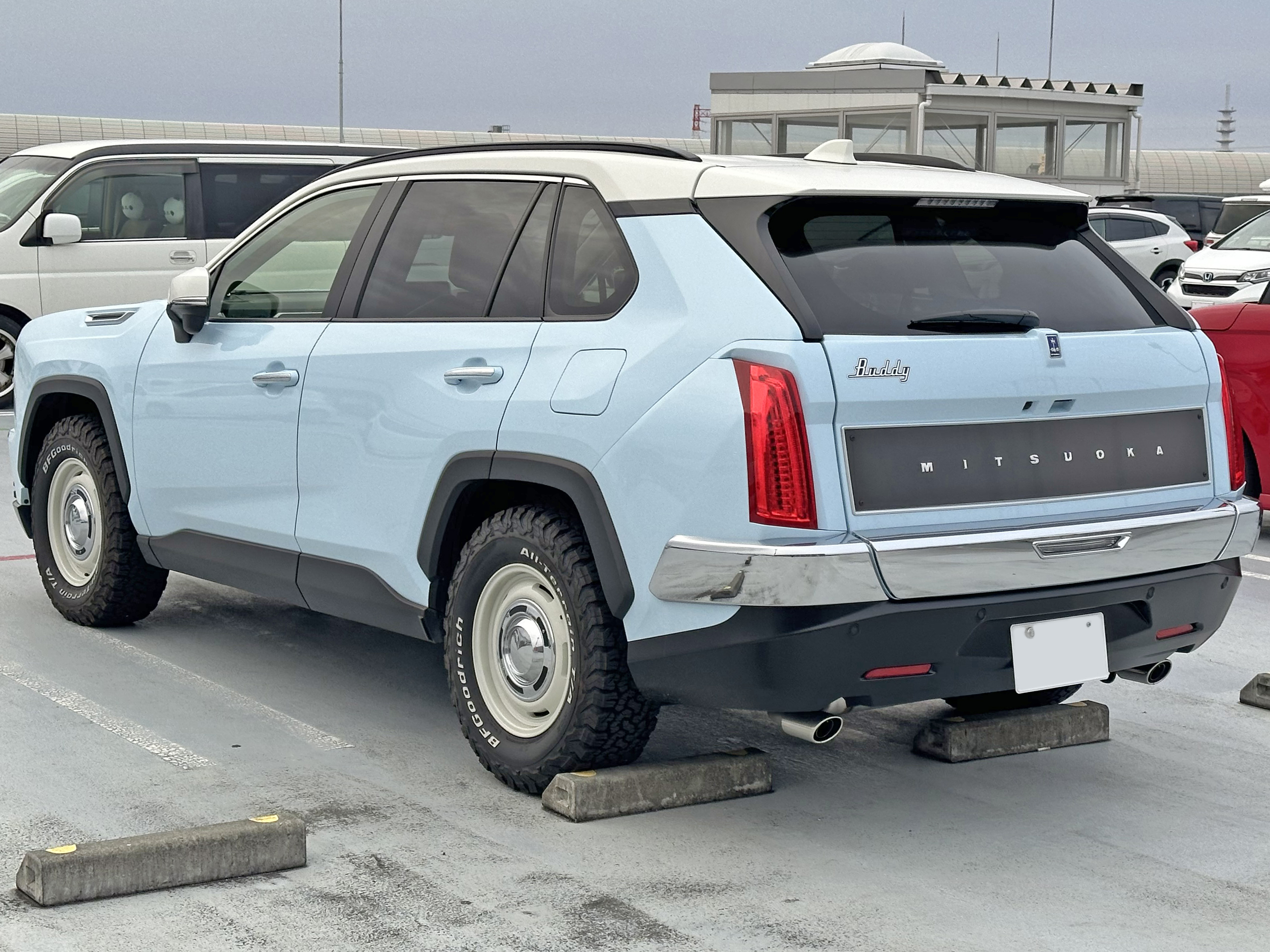
Rear view

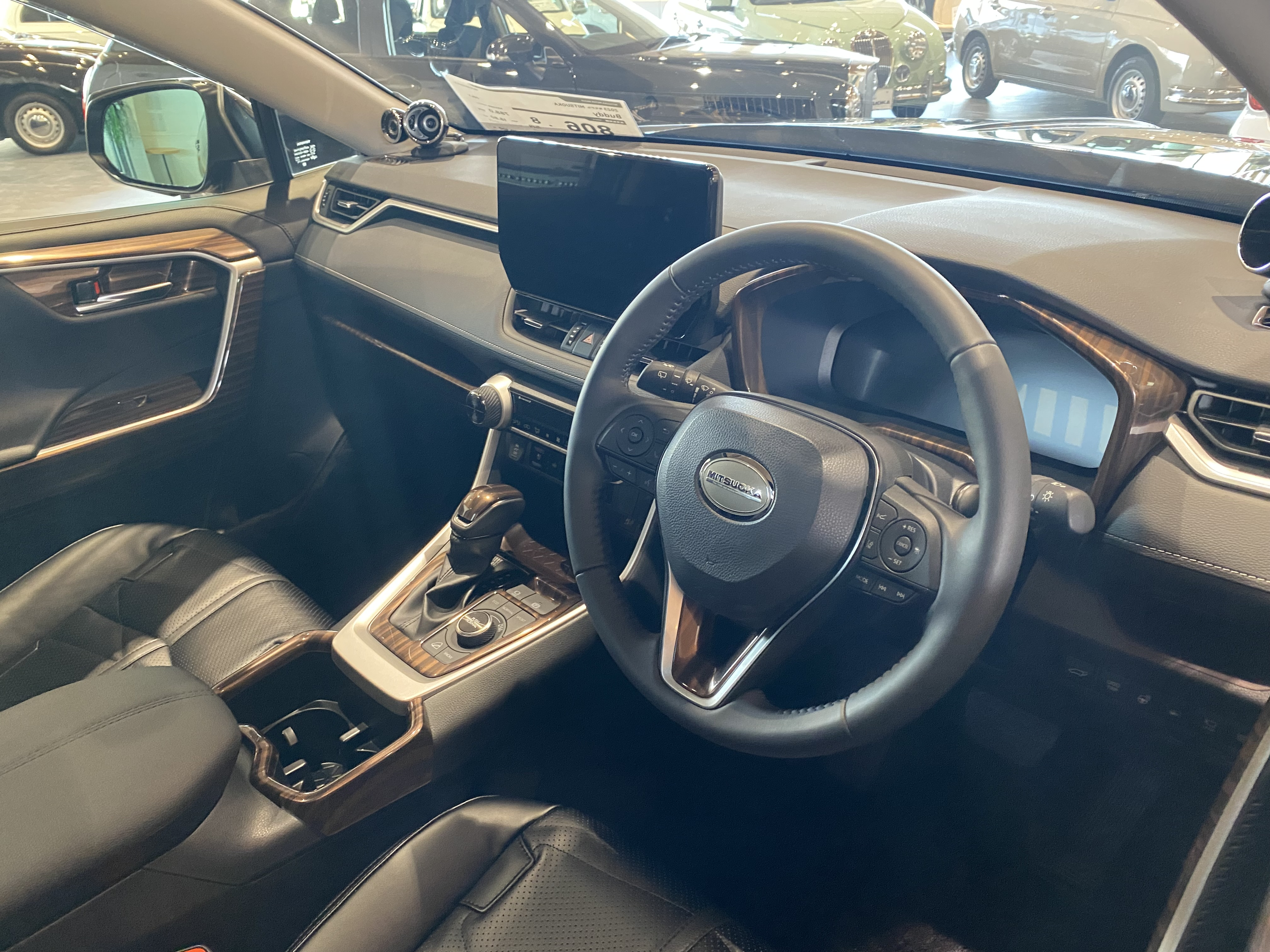
Interior

=== Powertrain ===
| Type | Years | Power at rpm | Torque at rpm |
|---|---|---|---|
| 1,986 cc (121.2 cu in) 2.0 L M20A-FKS I4 | 2018 | 126 kW (171 PS; 169 hp) at 6,600 | 203 N⋅m (150 lb⋅ft) at 4,400 |
| 2,487 cc (151.8 cu in) 2.5 L A25A-FKS I4 | 2018 | 151 kW (205 PS; 202 hp) at 6,600 | 249 N⋅m (184 lb⋅ft) at 5,000 |
| 2,487 cc (151.8 cu in) 2.5 L A25A-FXS I4 (hybrid) | 2018 | 163 kW (222 PS; 219 hp) at 5,700 (combined) | 279 N⋅m (206 lb⋅ft) at 3,600 (combined) |
| 2,487 cc (151.8 cu in) 2.5 L A25B-FXS I4 (hybrid, China) | 2019 | 163 kW (222 PS; 219 hp) at 5,700 (combined) | 279 N⋅m (206 lb⋅ft) at 3,600 (combined) |
| 2,487 cc (151.8 cu in) 2.5 L A25A-FXS I4 (plug-in hybrid) | 2020 | 225 kW (306 PS; 302 hp) (combined) | |

=== Safety ===
In September 2019, Teknikens Värld ran both the petrol and hybrid versions of the RAV4 on the moose test, where both vehicles failed. The testers noted "dangerous behavior" on the cone course, and that the electronic stability control "engaged very late", causing both vehicles to hop up on their outer tyres multiple times during the test. In response to the findings, Toyota issued a software update. In January 2020, Teknikens Värld retested the model, giving it a passing mark.

==== ANCAP ====
ANCAP test results* Toyota RAV4 all variants (2019, aligned with Euro NCAP)
| Test | Points | % |
|---|---|---|
| Overall: | 5 /5 stars | |
| Adult occupant: | 35.6 | 93% |
| Child occupant: | 43.8 | 89% |
| Pedestrian: | 40.9 | 85% |
| Safety assist: | 10.7 | 83% |

==== Euro NCAP ====
Euro NCAP test results* Toyota RAV4 Hybrid AWD (LHD) (2019)
| Test | Points | % |
|---|---|---|
| Overall: | 5 /5 stars | |
| Adult occupant: | 35.7 | 93% |
| Child occupant: | 42.8 | 87% |
| Pedestrian: | 40.9 | 85% |
| Safety assist: | 10.1 | 77% |

==== IIHS ====
The 2019 model year RAV4 awarded "Top Safety Pick+" by IIHS. The RAV4 received the Good rating in all categories except for the updated side impact test and headlights. For the headlights, optional Adaptive Front Headlight System received the Good rating, and standard reflector LED headlights received the Poor rating.

IIHS scores (2019 model year)
| Small overlap front (driver) | Good | | |
| Small overlap front (passenger) | Good | | |
| Moderate overlap front (original test) | Good | | |
| Side impact (original test) | Good | | |
| Side impact (updated test) | Acceptable | | |
| Roof strength | Good | | |
| Head restraints and seats | Good | | |
| Headlights | Good | Marginal | Poor |
| Front crash prevention: vehicle-to-vehicle | Superior | | |
| Front crash prevention: vehicle-to-pedestrian (day) | Superior | | |
| Child restraint LATCH ease of use | Good+ | | |

==== Latin NCAP ====
The Japan-made RAV4 in its most basic Latin American market configuration with 7 airbags received 5 stars for adult occupants, 5 stars for toddlers and Advanced Award from Latin NCAP in 2019.

Latin NCAP 2.0 test results Toyota RAV 4 + 7 Airbags (2019, based on Euro NCAP 2008)
| Test | Points | Stars |
|---|---|---|
| Adult occupant: | 29.42/34.0 | 5 /5 stars |
| Child occupant: | 43.00/49.00 | 5 /5 stars |

==== TNCAP ====
TNCAP (1.0) test result Toyota RAV4 2.0 'Prestige' (petrol) (2023, similar to Euro NCAP 2017)
| Test | Points | % |
|---|---|---|
| Overall: | 5/5 stars | |
| Adult occupant: | 33.128 | 87% |
| Child occupant: | 42 | 85% |
| Pedestrian: | 35.347 | 84% |
| Safety assist: | 8.343 | 69% |

== Sixth generation (XA60; 2025) ==
Sixth generation
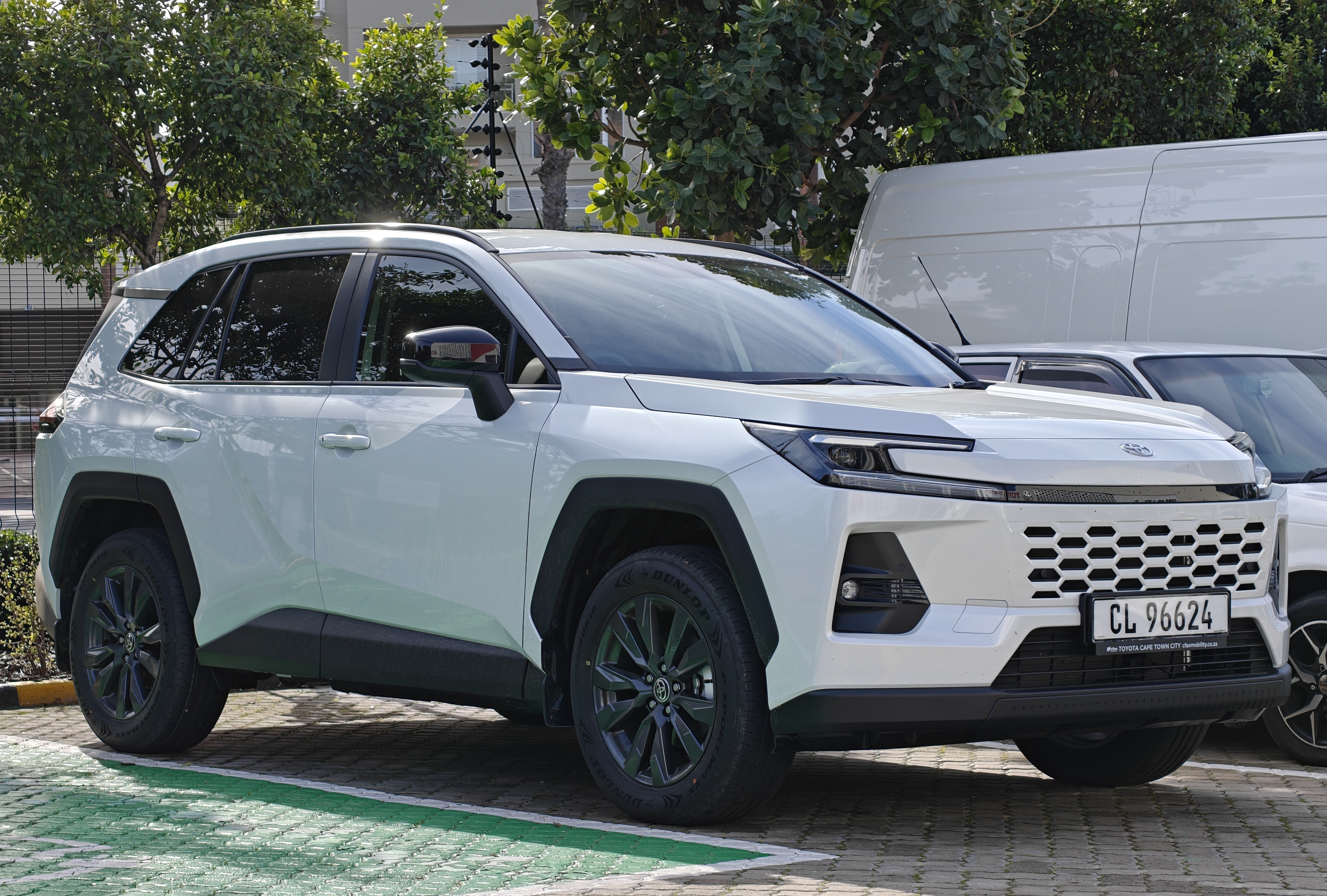
- Toyota RAV4 Hybrid (South Africa)

Overview
- Model code: XA60
- Also called: Toyota Wildlander (GAC Toyota, China); Suzuki Across (Europe, plug-in hybrid)
- Production: December 2025 – present
- Model years: 2026–present
- Assembly: Japan: Toyota City, Aichi (Takaoka plant); Ōbu, Aichi (Toyota Industries Nagakusa plant); Canada: Woodstock, Ontario (TMMC); Cambridge, Ontario (TMMC); China: Changchun, Jilin (FAW Toyota); Guangzhou (GAC Toyota); United States: Georgetown, Kentucky (TMMK)
- Designer: Hideo Koyama (project chief designer); Daisuke Iguchi and Junya Furuta (exterior); Ryo Nakane and Naoyuki Kawamoto (interior)

Body and chassis
- Body style: 5-door SUV
- Platform: TNGA: GA-K
- Related: Toyota Camry (XV80)

Powertrain
- Engine: Petrol; 2.0 L M20C-FKS I4 (China, Wildlander); 2.0 L M20D-FKS I4 (China); Petrol hybrid; 2.0 L M20F-FXS I4 (China, Wildlander); 2.0 L M20G-FXS I4 (China); 2.5 L A25A-FXS I4 (AXAN64); Petrol plug-in hybrid; 2.5 L A25A-FXS I4 (AXAP64)
- Power output: Petrol: FWD and AWD: [CN] 126 kW (171 PS; 169 hp); Petrol hybrid: 2.0 L, FWD and AWD: [CN] 112 kW (152 PS; 150 hp); 2.5 L, FWD and AWD: [CN] 136 kW (185 PS; 182 hp); FWD: 169 kW (230 PS; 227 hp); AWD: 176 kW (239 PS; 236 hp); Plug-in hybrid: FWD: (EU) 197 kW (268 PS; 264 hp); AWD: 221–239 kW (300–325 PS; 296–321 hp)
- Transmission: e-CVT
- Hybrid drivetrain: Power-split hybrid (e-Four AWD optional/standard per grade); Plug-in hybrid
- Battery: Petrol hybrid: 1.6 kWh Li-ion; Petrol plug-in hybrid: 22.7 kWh Li-ion
- Plug-in charging: 11 kW AC (PHEV); 50 kW DC CCS (PHEV)

Dimensions
- Wheelbase: 2,690 mm (105.9 in)
- Length: 4,600–4,645 mm (181.1–182.9 in)
- Width: 1,855–1,880 mm (73.0–74.0 in)
- Height: 1,680–1,685 mm (66.1–66.3 in)
- Curb weight: 1,710–1,720 kg (3,770–3,792 lb) (HEV); 1,980–1,990 kg (4,365–4,387 lb) (PHEV)

The sixth-generation RAV4 was revealed on 20–21 May 2025 in Japan, Canada and the United States. It is the first RAV4 generation to have a "fully electrified" lineup, offering either a fifth-generation hybrid (HEV) or sixth-generation plug-in hybrid (PHEV) drivetrain. Production began in late 2025, with deliveries starting in North America and Japan for the 2026 model year, in China during November 2025 and in Europe and Australasia during the first half of 2026.

Toyota groups exterior treatments into three "design themes": "Core" (LE, XLE, Limited), "Adventure" (Woodland) and "Sport" (SE, XSE, the GR Sport). The body dimensions are largely carried over from the XA50, but the GA-K platform receives additional structural adhesive, braced suspension towers, and revised sub-frames to improve rigidity and NVH.

=== Development ===
Early work on the sixth-generation RAV4 began in early 2022 under the lead of chief engineer Yoshinori Futonagane, with full development commencing in October of that year, giving a development period of roughly three years. Development was organised around the concept "Life is an Adventure", with electrification, diversification, and intelligence identified as the three core areas of focus.

The XA60 retains the basic chassis and subframe of its predecessor, though Toyota increased body rigidity and reworked the underfloor to accommodate the larger plug-in hybrid battery pack. Futonagane said the retained chassis was modified rather than carried over unchanged: "It's a little bit of having your cake and eating it too. While we carried over the same chassis, cars are always evolving, so there's always changes to the basic design." Futonagane has said the TNGA-K platform underpinning the XA60 "has got a lot of life left" and could plausibly continue into a seventh-generation RAV4 beyond 2033, citing the growing role of electrification and digital systems in delivering generational improvements without requiring an entirely new architecture.

Rather than growing the vehicle to match competitors, Toyota deliberately retained the outgoing model's length and width, reasoning that customer enthusiasm for the previous generation's footprint represented what Futonagane described as "a global vote for the sweet spot". Height increased from 1,605 mm (63.2 in) to 1,685 mm (66.3 in) in Cruiser specification, but length and width carried over from the XA50.

Development was organised around the concept "Life is an Adventure", with electrification, diversification, and intelligence identified as the three core areas of focus.Toyota reorganised its trim strategy around three "emotional grades", Core, Rugged (badged Adventure or Woodland depending on market), and Sport, replacing the fifth generation's separate petrol and hybrid trim structures, on the basis that a fully electrified lineup made the earlier distinction unnecessary. Claimed efficiency gains of eight to ten percent over the outgoing hybrid were attributed by Futonagane not solely to the powertrain, but jointly to aerodynamic refinement and new tyre development.

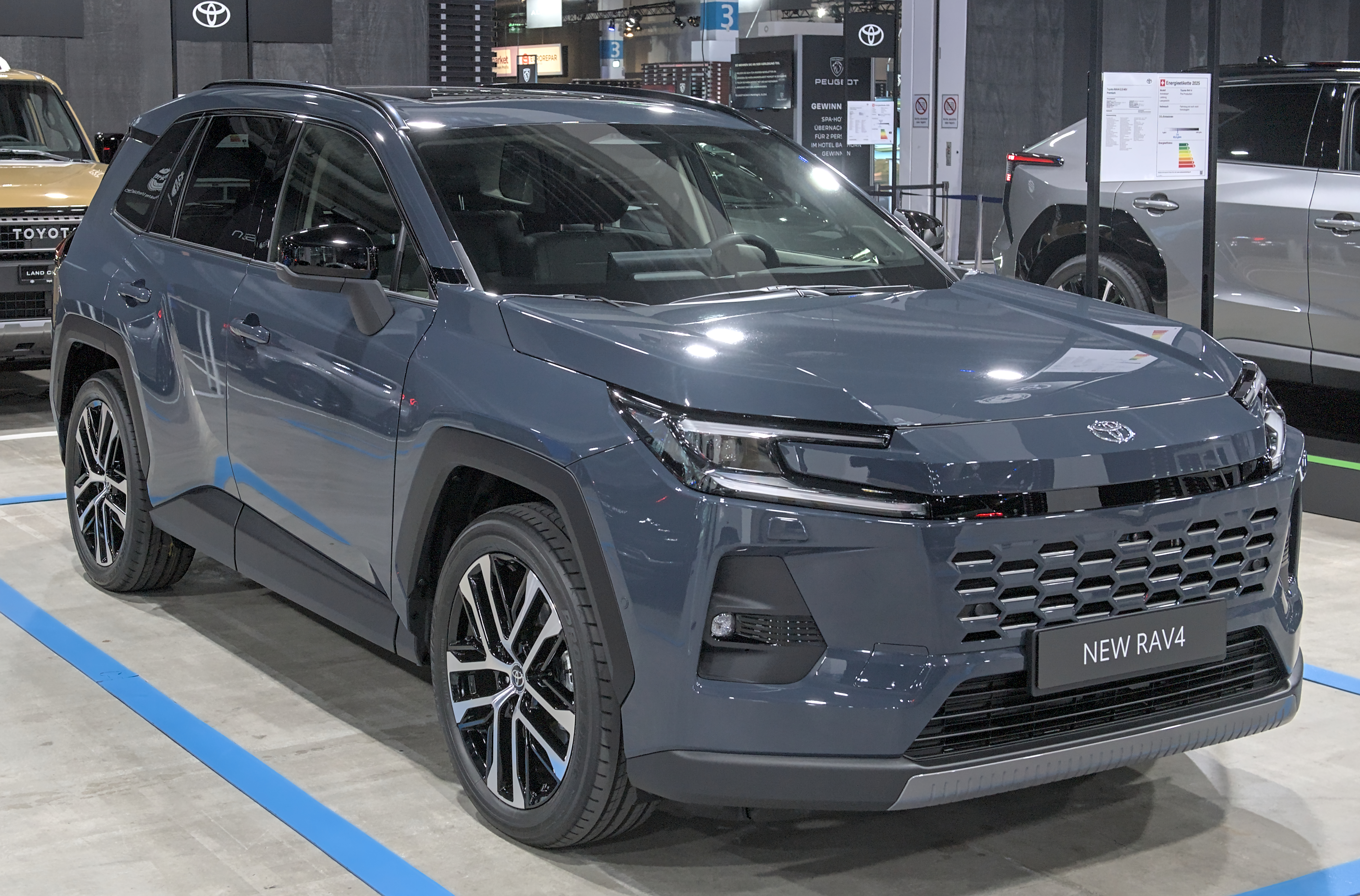
Core plug-in hybrid (Europe), front

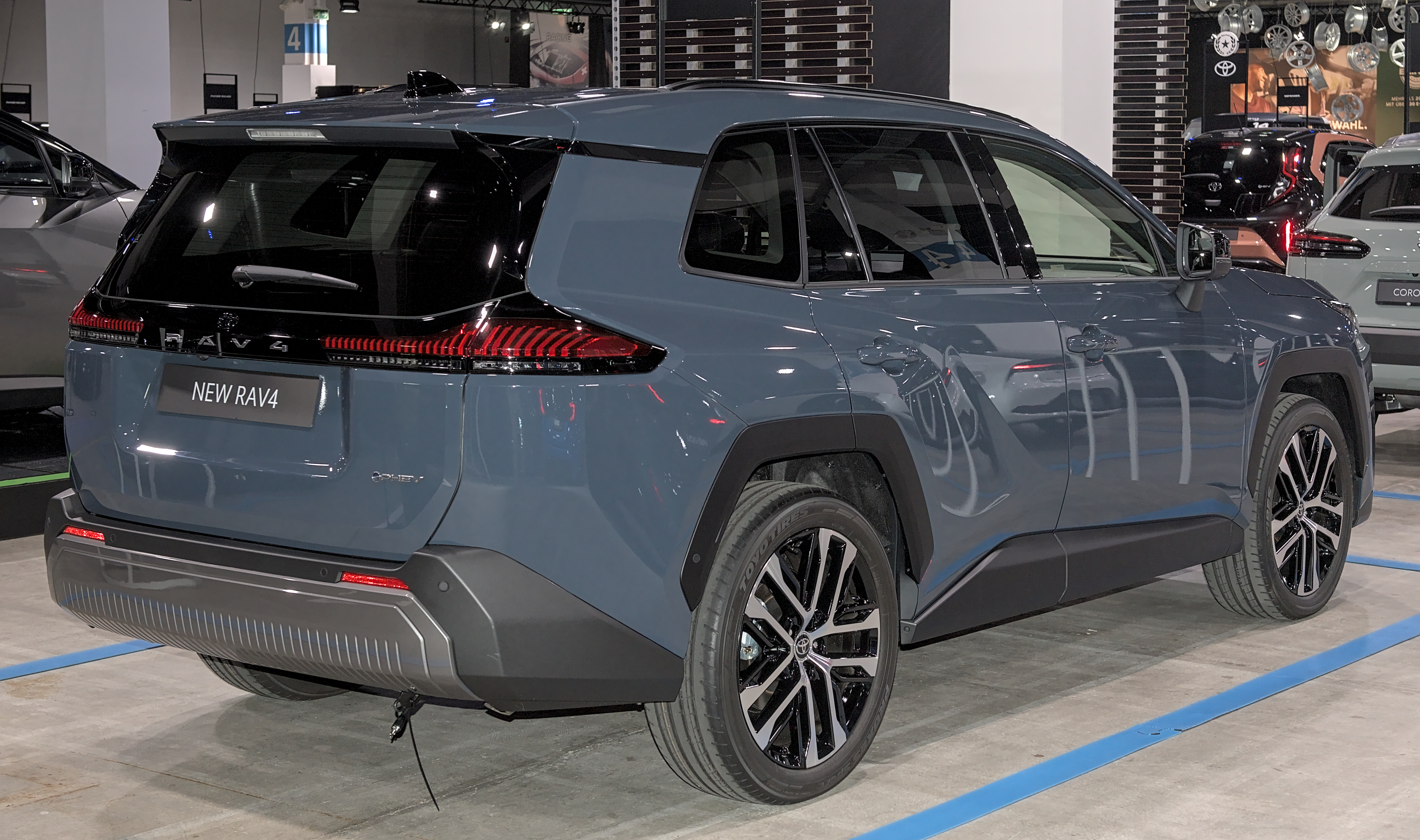
Core plug-in hybrid (Europe), rear

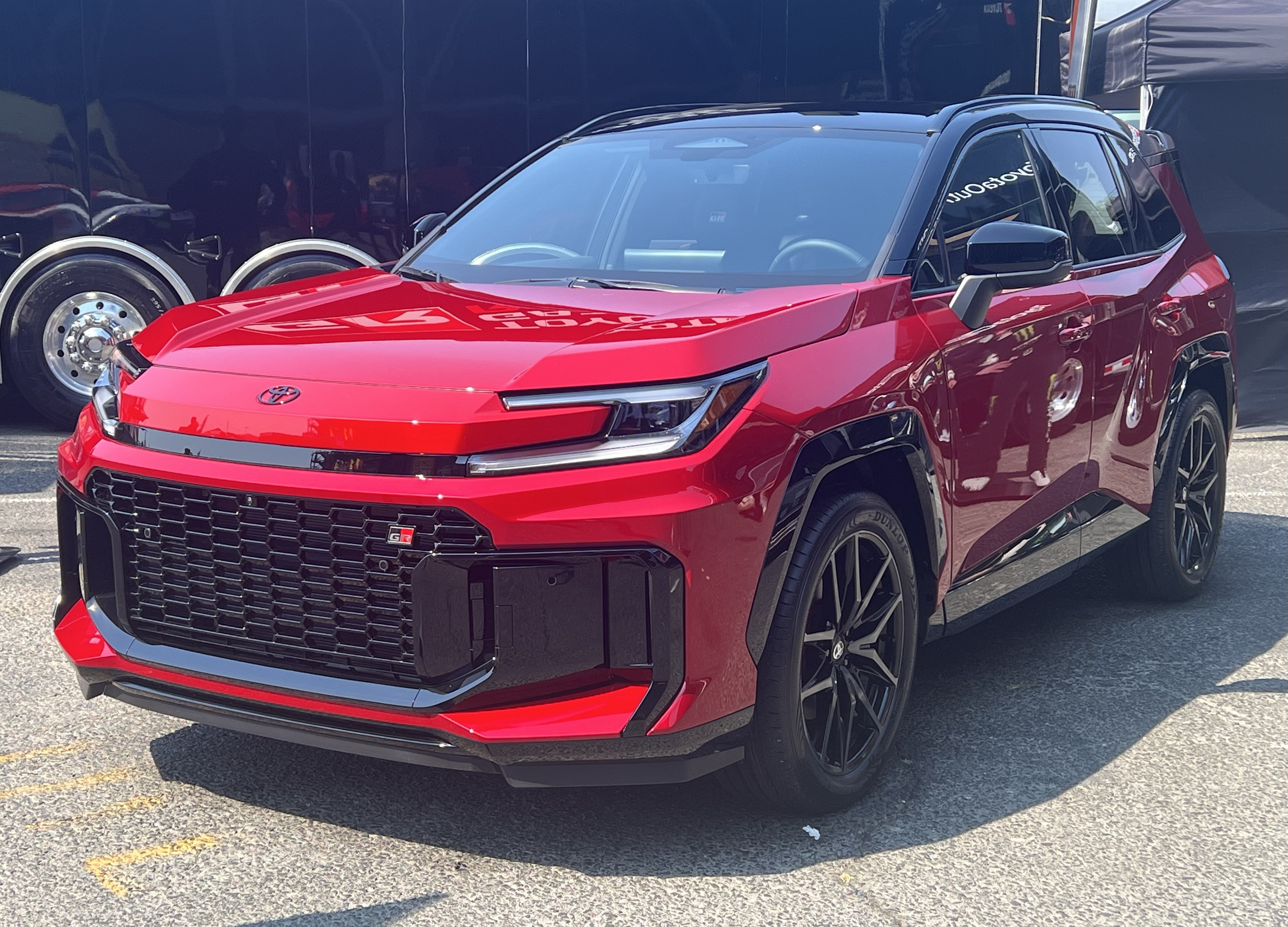
GR Sport (US)

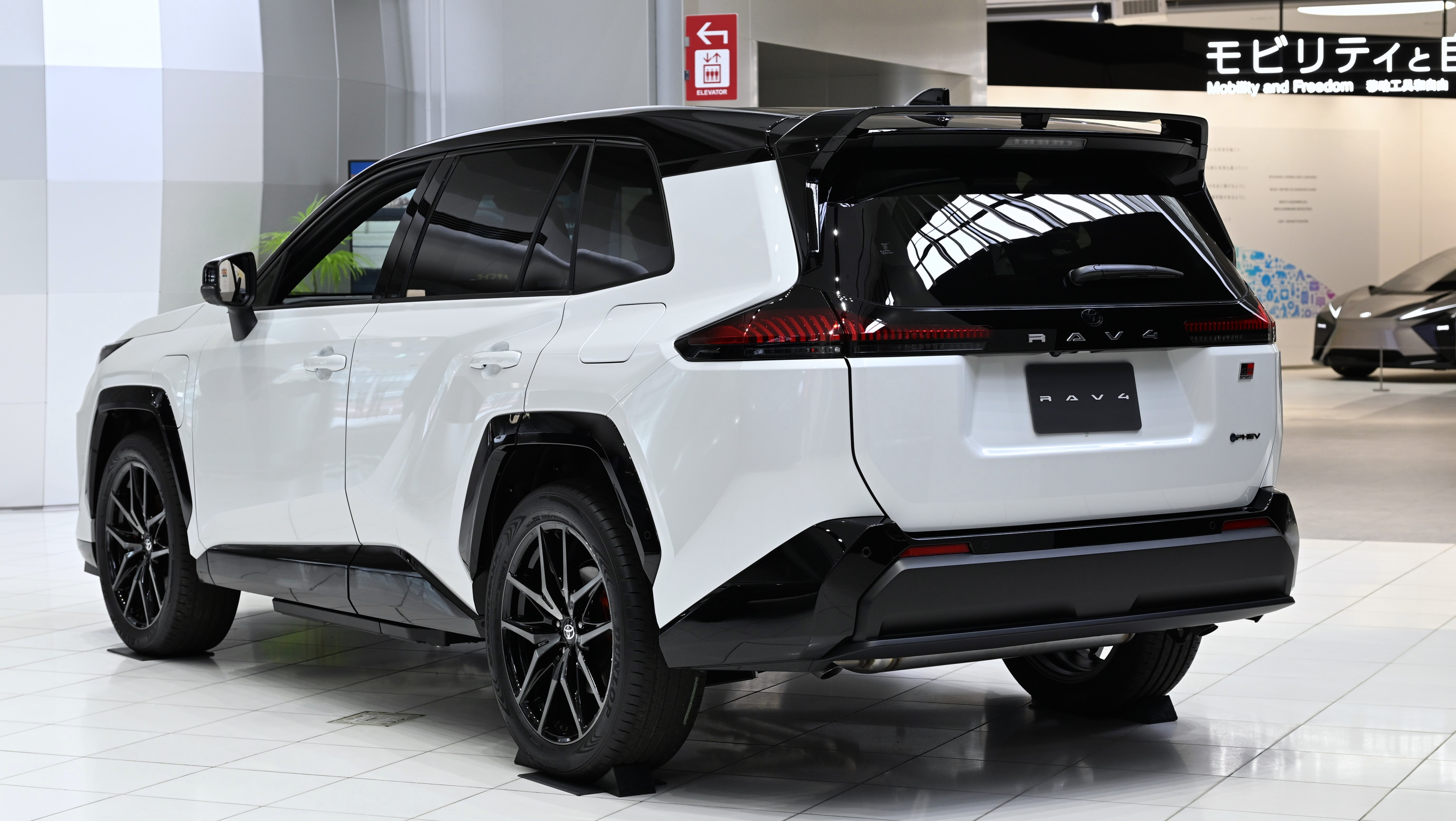
GR Sport plug-in hybrid (Japan)

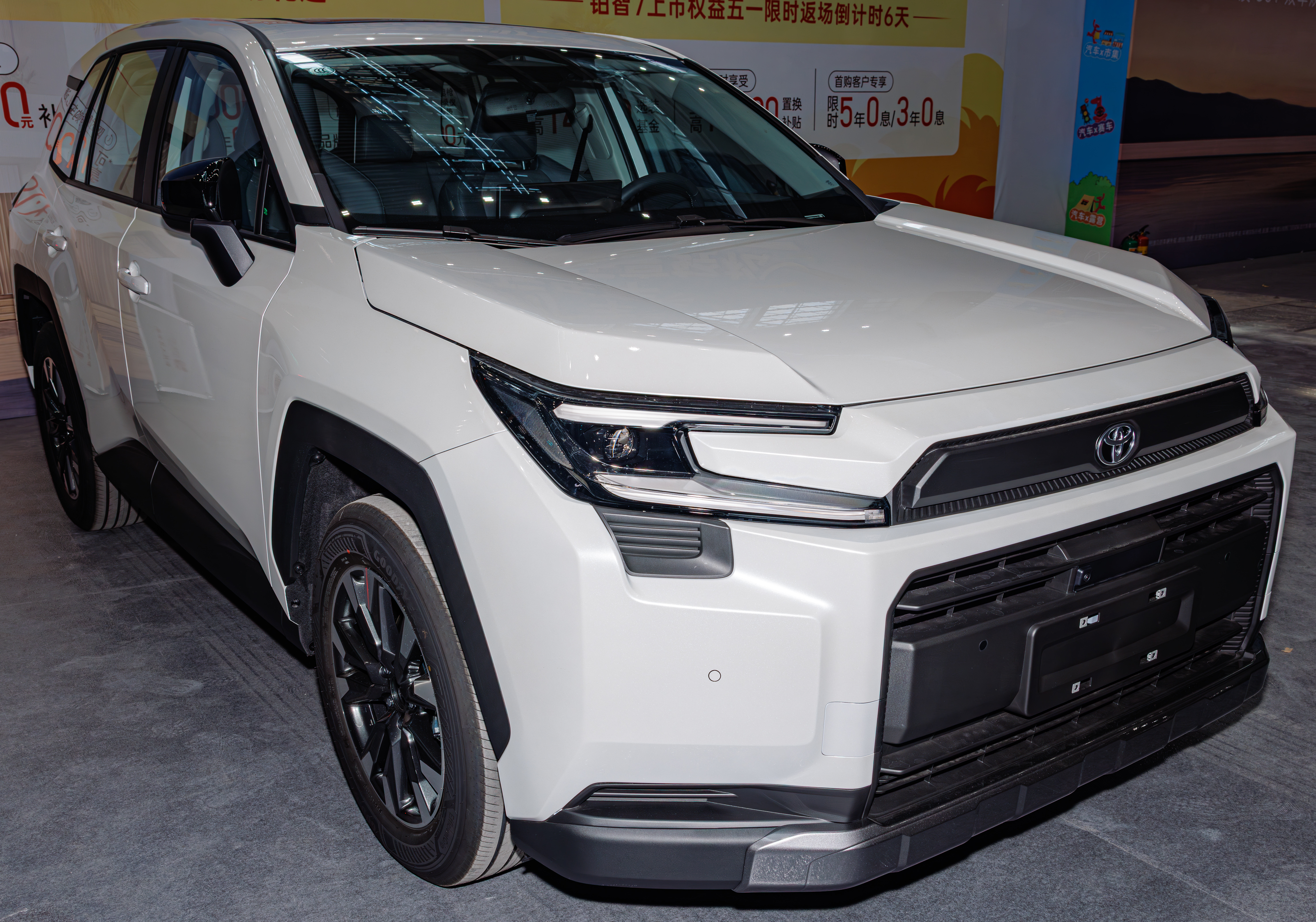
Adventure (China)

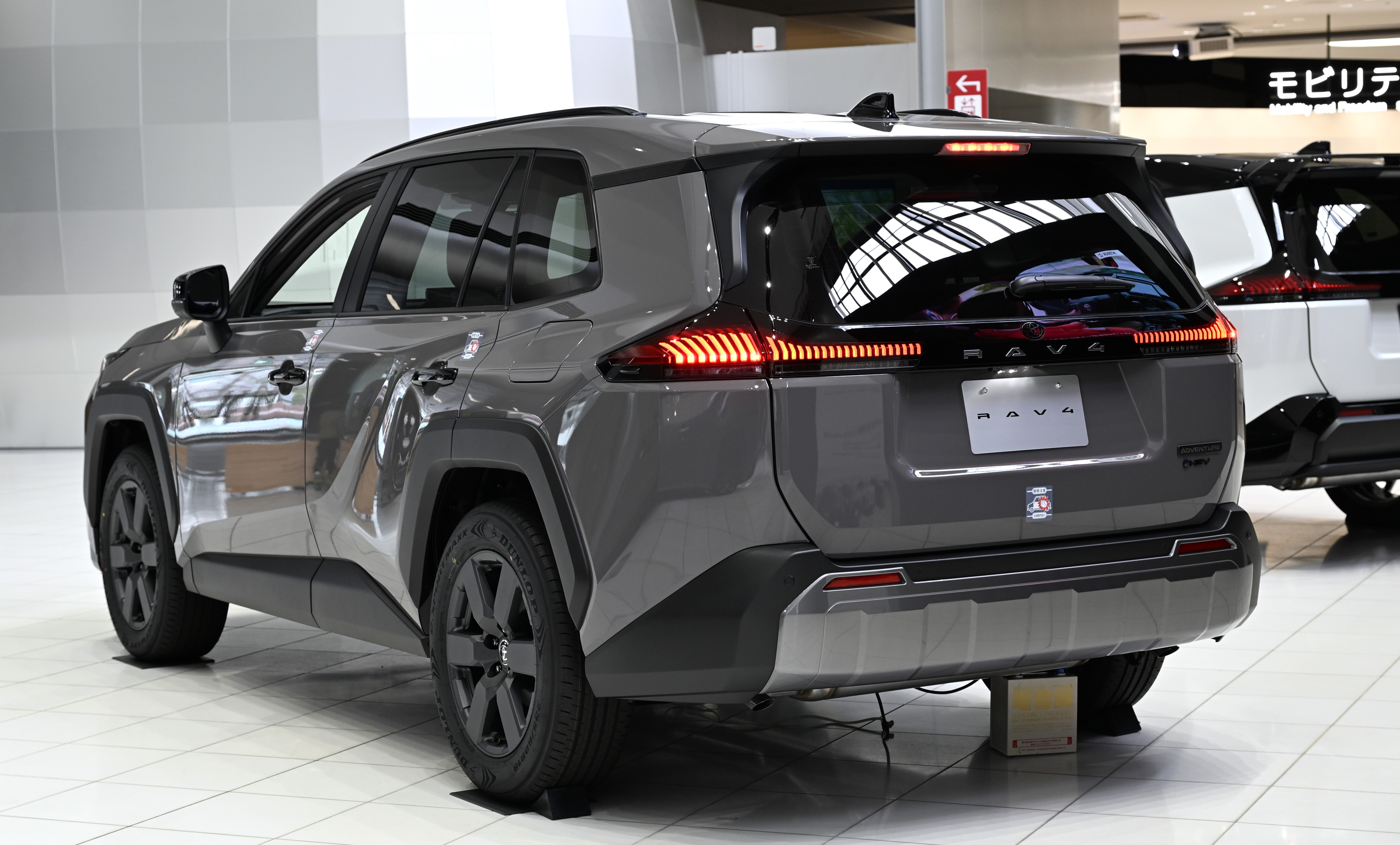
Adventure hybrid (Japan)

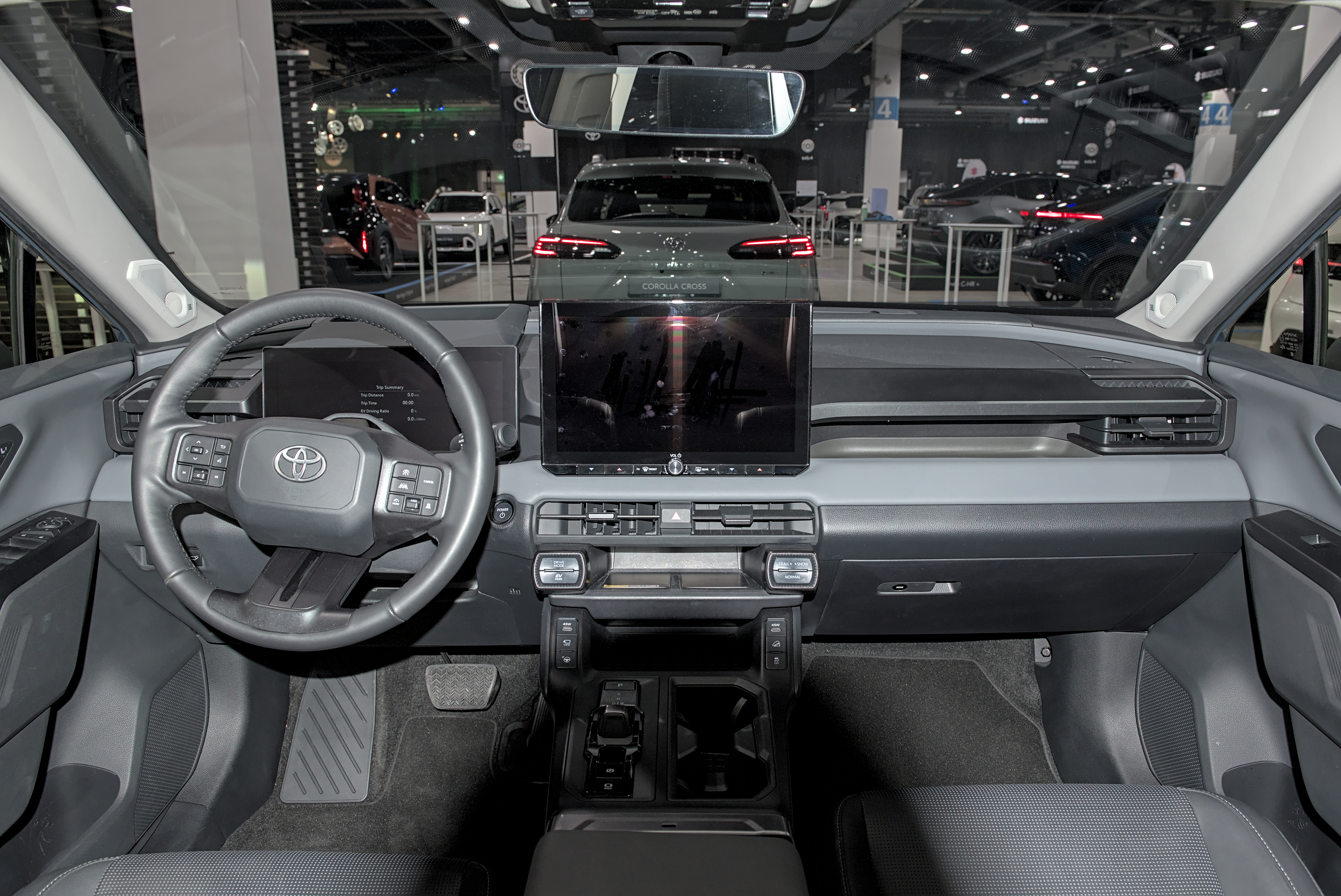
Interior

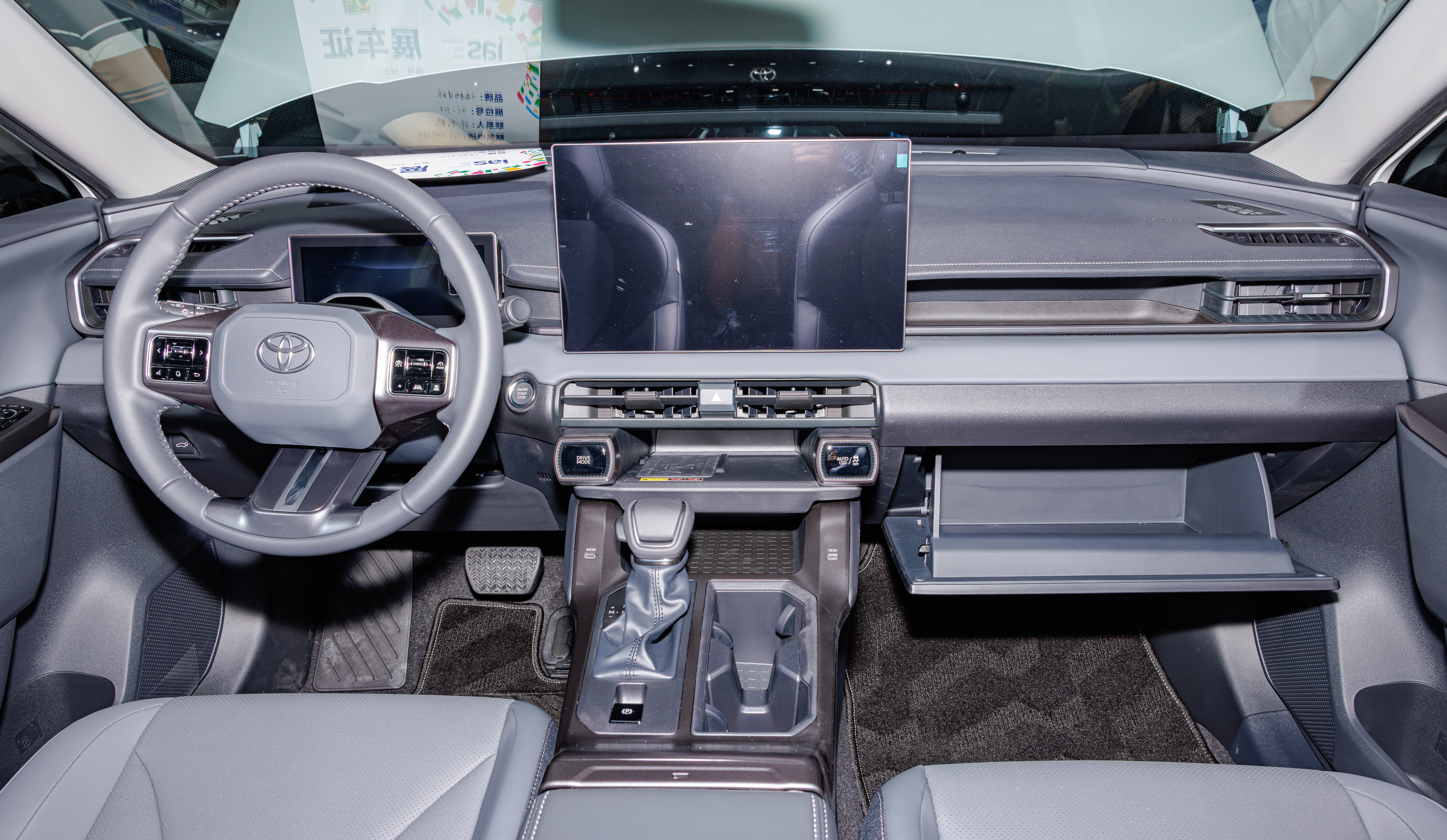
Interior (China)

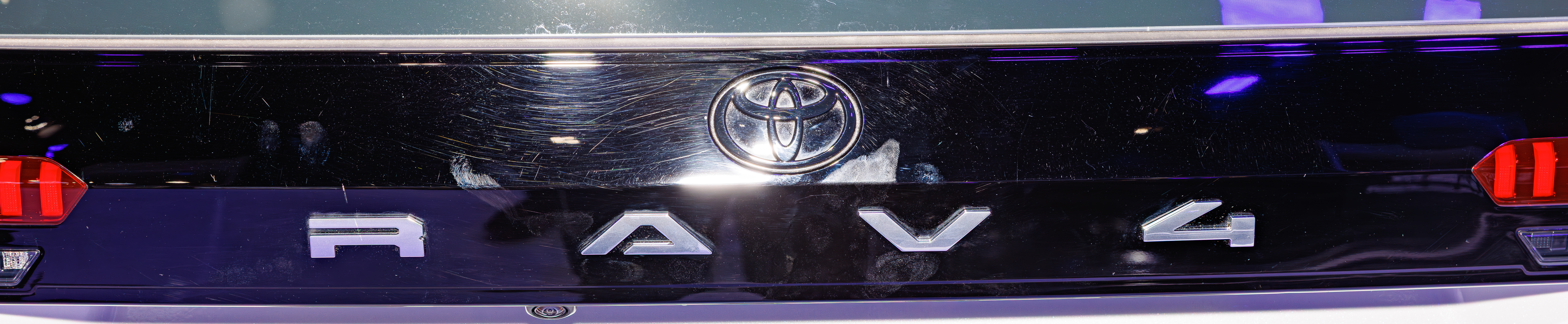
Wordmark

=== Toyota Wildlander (China) ===
The XA60 RAV4 will be sold in China under the Wildlander name, with similar front and rear fascias to the RAV4 Core model and will be produced in Guangzhou by GAC Toyota. Unlike the global model, a pure petrol version is offered with a 2.0-litre inline 4 (possibly the M20A-FKS; the actual engine is not yet known) producing 169 horsepower, with an engine of the same capacity also offered in a hybrid version producing 150 horsepower. The same hybrid powertrain as the global RAV4 with the 2.5-litre A25A-FXS engine will also be offered but is detuned with only 184 horsepower.

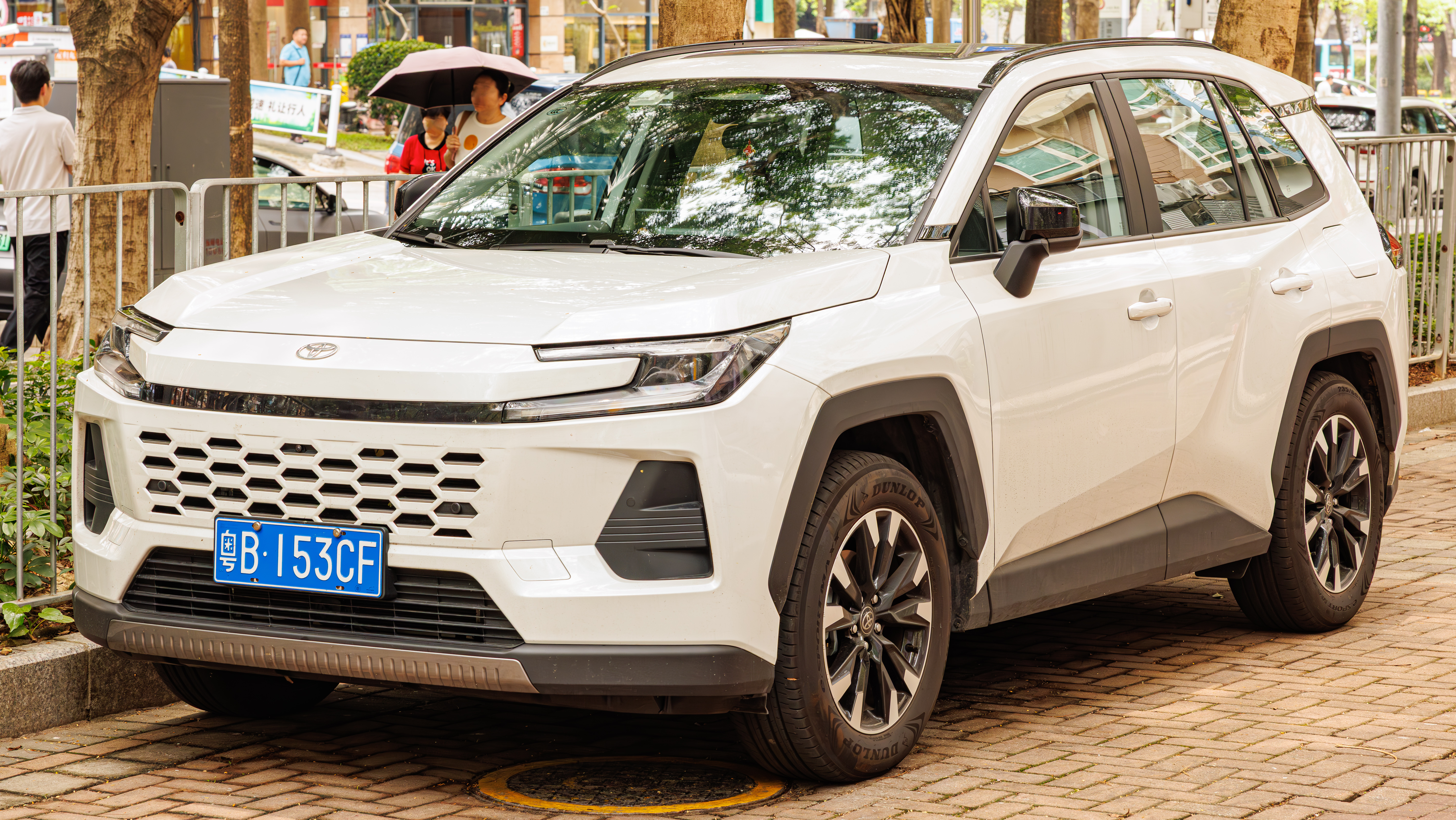
Toyota Wildlander Hybrid (China)

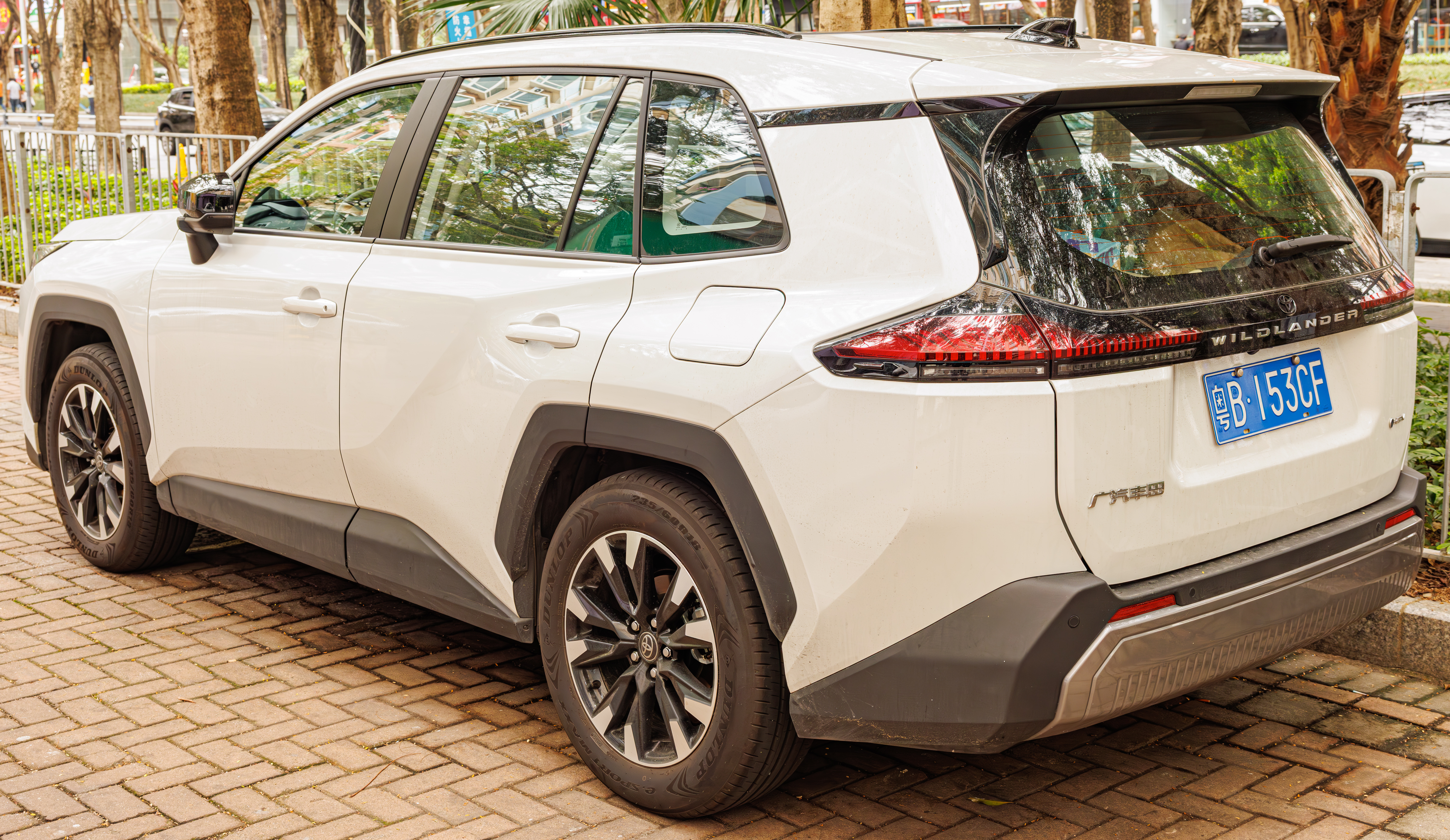
Toyota Wildlander Hybrid (China; rear view)

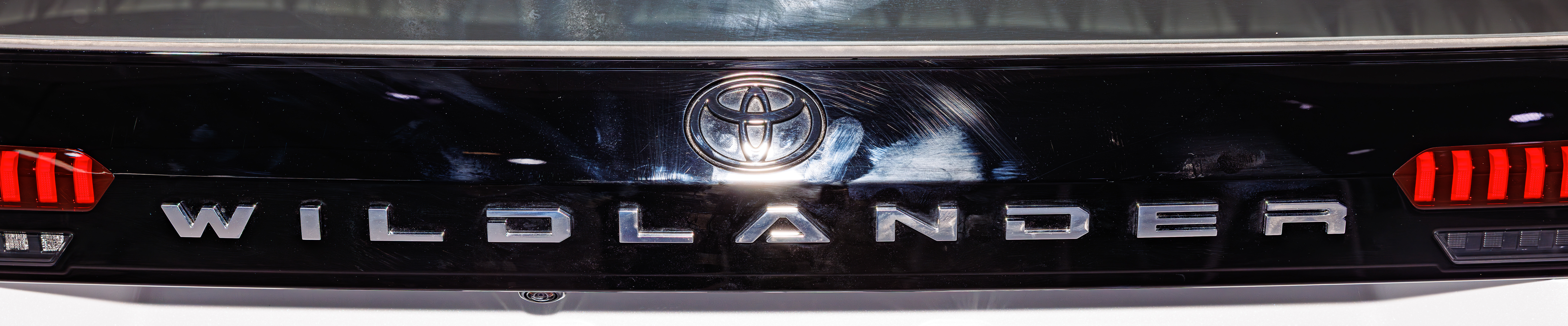
Wordmark (Wildlander)

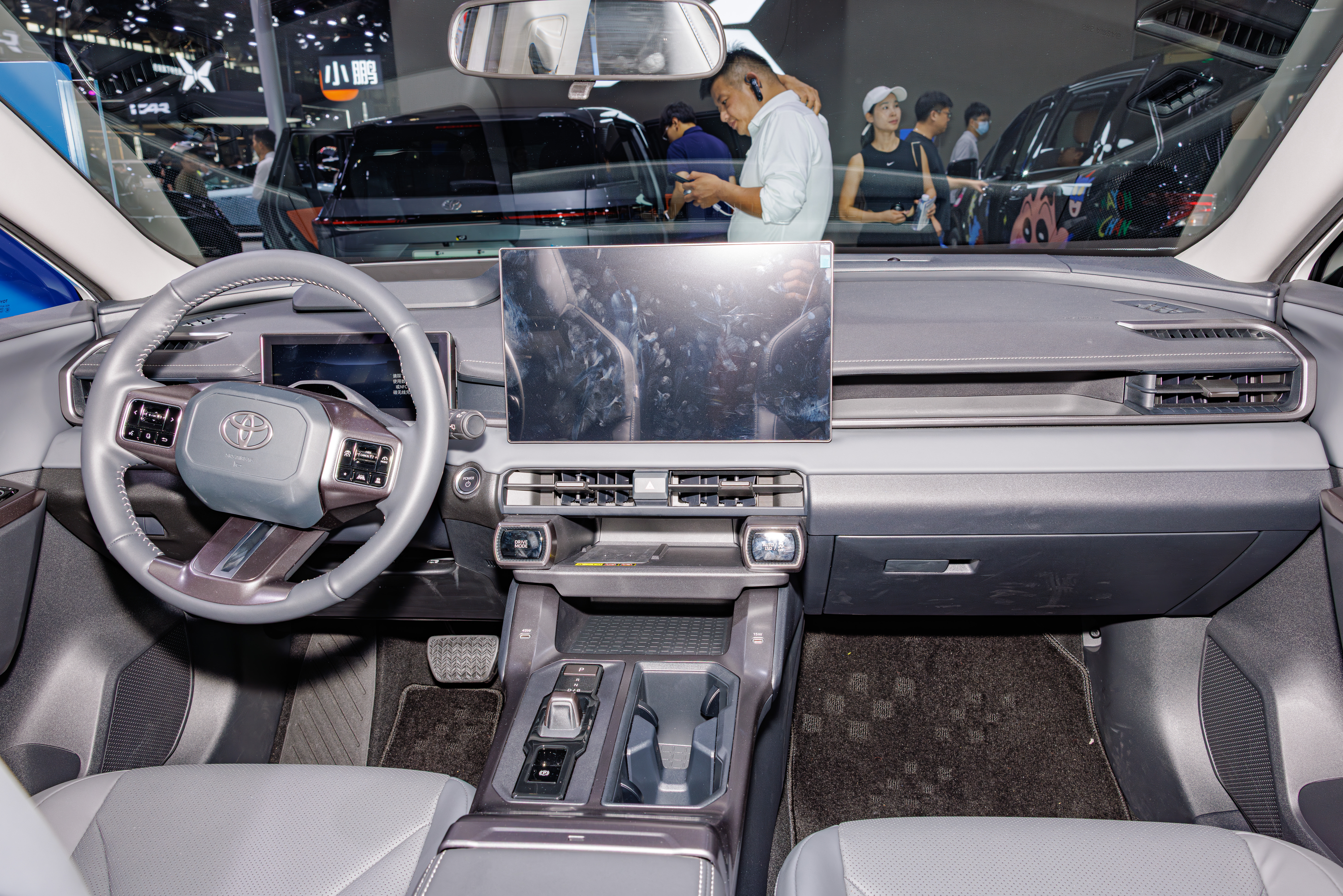
Interior (Wildlander)

=== Suzuki Across (Europe) ===
A Suzuki-badged version of the RAV4 PHEV called Suzuki Across was introduced in February 2026, exclusively for the European market. with similar front and rear fascias to the Toyota RAV4 Adventure model.

Suzuki Across (Europe)

Rear View

=== Powertrains ===
Hybrid electric vehicle (HEV)

| Region | Drive | Combined output |
|---|---|---|
| North America | FWD | 169 kW (229 PS; 226 hp) |
| North America | AWD | 176 kW (239 PS; 236 hp) |
| Europe | FWD | 135 kW (183 PS; 180 hp) |
| Europe | AWD | 140 kW (191 PS; 188 hp) |
| Japan | AWD | 177 kW (241 PS; 237 hp) |
| China | FWD; AWD | 110 kW (150 PS; 148 hp) [2.0 L] 134 kW (182 PS; 180 hp) [2.5 L] |

Plug-in hybrid electric vehicle (PHEV)

| Region | Drive | Output | EV range (est.) |
|---|---|---|---|
| North America | AWD | 239 kW; 324 PS; 320 hp | 50 mi (80 km) EPA |
| Europe | FWD | 197 kW (268 PS; 264 hp) | 100 km WLTP |
| Europe | AWD | 224 kW (304 PS; 300 hp) | 100 km WLTP |
| Japan | AWD | 224 kW (304 PS; 300 hp) | 150 km WLTP |

All PHEVs include silicon-carbide inverters, V2H capability and (grade-dependent) 50 kW CCS fast charging that replenishes 10–80 % in roughly 30 minutes. Towing capacity is 1,750 lb (794 kg) on FWD and LE AWD models, rising to 3,500 lb (1,588 kg) on other AWD grades.

=== Chassis and dynamics ===
- GA-K platform with reinforced sub-frames and extra spot welds.
- MacPherson-strut front / multi-link rear suspension; GR Sport adds GR-tuned dampers and a stiffer cross-member.
- Faster-ratio electric power steering (EPS); GR map on GR Sport.
- Larger ventilated disc brakes, with enhanced regenerative blending on PHEV models.

=== Technology ===
A 10.5-inch touchscreen is standard, with a 12.9-inch unit on upper grades. Both systems run Toyota's Arene software platform, which supports wireless smartphone mirroring and cloud-based navigation. Independent road tests have noted improvements in screen responsiveness, wireless smartphone integration, and overall infotainment usability.

=== Safety ===
The XA60 debuts Toyota Safety Sense 4.0, which adds front cross-traffic alert, lane-change assist, and predictive curve speed control, all of which will be delivered via over-the-air updates.

While the RAV4 was likely to have received a 5-star rating by ANCAP under ANCAP's 2025 testing conditions, it was possible that it would receive a lesser score under ANCAP's new testing conditions due to commence in the second half of 2026. Toyota have chosen to delay the testing until they can implement changes that are likely to receive a 5-star result under the new testing conditions.

=== Production and rollout ===
The PHEV-only GR Sport grade (0–100 km/h, 0–62 mph in 5.8 s) and its 100 km WLTP electric range have been widely noted by the press as key advances over the outgoing XA50, although European outlets criticise the lower hybrid outputs versus North America.

=== Global trim levels ===
| Market | HEV grades | PHEV grades | Notes |
|---|---|---|---|
| Australia and New Zealand | GX, GXL, Edge, XSE and Cruiser. | First Toyota PHEV in AU; GR Sport AWD and XSE. | Deliveries H1 2026. |
| Canada | LE, XLE, XSE, Limited, Woodland | SE, XSE, GR Sport | Built at TMMC Ontario. |
| Europe (EU/UK) | Icon, Design, Excel | 197 kW (268 PS) FWD and 224 kW (305 PS) AWD, GR Sport | HEV outputs detuned for Euro 7 compliance. |
| Japan | Z, Adventure, GR Sport | 224 kW (305 PS) AWD (GR Sport) | Sales start December 2025. |
| Latin America (Brazil) | Hybrid AWD only | — | Imports from Japan. |
| Mexico | LE, XLE, Woodland, and Limited | — | Sales start March 2026. |
| Middle East | Core and Adventure | — | Sales start February 2026. |
| Philippines | Limited and Adventure | — | Imports from Japan. AWD standard on both models. |
| Singapore | Premium | — | Sales start June 2026. |
| South Africa | 166 kW (223 hp), 174 kW (233 hp) AWD E-Four GX and VX | 235 kW (315 hp) GR Sport | Imports from Japan. Sales to begin in 2026 |
| Taiwan | Luxury, Prestige, Prestige+, Flagship, Adventure 4WD, and GR Sport 4WD | PHEV 4WD | Sales start January 2026. PHEV Sales start June 2026. |
| United States | LE, XLE, SE, XSE, Limited, Woodland | SE, XSE, Woodland, GR Sport | FWD standard on LE, XLE, SE; AWD elsewhere. |

== Sales ==
| Calendar year | United States | | | Canada | | Mexico | Japan | Europe | China | | Australia | |
| Calendar year | Overall | Hybrid | PHEV | Overall | Hybrid | Mexico | Japan | Europe | RAV4 | Wildlander | Overall | Hybrid |
|---|---|---|---|---|---|---|---|---|---|---|---|---|
| 1994 | | | | | | | | | | | 1,350 | |
| 1995 | | | | | | | | | | | 3,334 | |
| 1996 | 56,709 | | | | | | | | | | 4,768 | |
| 1997 | 67,489 | | | | | | | 23,580 | | | 5,361 | |
| 1998 | 64,990 | | | | | | | 25,466 | | | 7,800 | |
| 1999 | 57,138 | | | | | | | 22,191 | | | 6,988 | |
| 2000 | 53,777 | | | | | | 35,831 | 25,449 | | | 8,413 | |
| 2001 | 86,368 | | | | | | 25,600 | 53,976 | | | 10,969 | |
| 2002 | 86,601 | | | | | | 13,711 | 88,764 | | | 12,196 | |
| 2003 | 73,204 | | | | | 1,286 | 11,731 | 95,867 | | | 12,026 | |
| 2004 | 70,314 | | | | | 7,085 | 12,025 | 101,052 | | | 13,220 | |
| 2005 | 70,518 | | | | | 10,462 | 13,618 | 93,492 | | | 11,881 | |
| 2006 | 152,047 | | | | | 14,848 | 22,523 | 106,315 | | | 14,834 | |
| 2007 | 172,752 | | | | | 11,948 | 14,063 | 97,414 | | | 14,507 | |
| 2008 | 137,020 | | | 20,522 | | 7,491 | 11,210 | 62,501 | | | 14,122 | |
| 2009 | 149,088 | | | 25,784 | | 5,958 | 7,915 | 44,723 | 67,880 | | 12,635 | |
| 2010 | 170,877 | | | 22,810 | | 5,323 | 6,027 | 50,930 | 98,057 | | 14,597 | |
| 2011 | 132,237 | | | 21,550 | | 4,684 | 4,051 | 43,663 | 100,309 | | 13,125 | |
| 2012 | 171,877 | | | 25,942 | | 5,198 | 3,012 | 36,030 | 98,179 | | 14,651 | |
| 2013 | 218,249 | | | 33,156 | | 10,830 | 2,305 | 47,534 | 117,800 | | 16,983 | |
| 2014 | 267,698 | | | 36,639 | | 9,539 | 2,150 | 54,187 | 124,680 | | 18,160 | |
| 2015 | 315,412 | 1,507 | | 42,246 | | 10,489 | 1,790 | 51,838 | 116,731 | | 18,435 | |
| 2016 | 352,154 | 45,070 | | 49,103 | | 10,709 | | 69,919 | 116,389 | | 19,526 | |
| 2017 | 407,594 | 50,559 | | 50,894 | | 7,933 | | 71,047 | 128,545 | | 21,077 | |
| 2018 | 427,170 | 48,124 | | 55,385 | | 6,304 | | 68,779 | 144,049 | | 22,165 | |
| 2019 | 448,071 | 92,525 | | 65,248 | 14,246 | 13,913 | 53,965 | 91,800 | 125,977 | | 24,260 | |
| 2020 | 430,387 | 115,974 | 3,200 | 67,977 | | 10,015 | 54,848 | 90,761 | 174,940 | 82,071 | 38,537 | 26,398 |
| 2021 | 407,739 | 120,983 | 27,707 | 61,933 | | 11,731 | 49,594 | 161,266 | 199,675 | 128,086 | 35,751 | 25,850 |
| 2022 | 399,941 | 149,938 | 18,567 | 55,921 | | 12,074 | 31,118 | 113,297 | 165,278 | 135,968 | 34,845 | 26,547 |
| 2023 | 434,943 | 161,125 | 26,073 | 74,688 | 30,741 | 15,438 | 41,018 | 87,582 | 182,059 | 143,383 | 29,627 | 25,666 |
| 2024 | 475,193 | 208,356 | 31,093 | 77,556 | | 15,768 | 30,599 | 94,344 | 193,402 | 138,036 | 58,718 | 55,902 |
| 2025 | 479,288 | 181,433 | 20,272 | 75,573 | | 15,784 | | 91,277 | 204,184 | 112,730 | 51,947 | |
