= GAC Toyota =

Automobile manufacturing company

GAC Toyota Motor Co., Ltd.
- Native name: 广汽丰田汽车有限公司
- Type: joint venture
- Industry: Automotive
- Founded: 1 September 2004; 22 years ago
- Headquarters: Guangzhou, China
- Area served: China
- Products: Automobiles
- Owner: GAC Group (50%); Toyota Motor Corporation (50%)
- Number of employees: Approximately 5,600
- Subsidiaries: GAC Toyota Engine Co., Ltd.
- Website: https://www.gac-toyota.com.cn/ (in Chinese)

GAC Toyota Motor Co., Ltd. (Chinese: 广汽丰田汽车有限公司) is an automobile manufacturing company headquartered in Guangzhou, China and a joint-venture between GAC Group and Toyota Motor Company for manufacturing Toyota's model platform in the Chinese market. It was founded on 1 September 2004.

== History ==
The company was founded in 2004 as Guangzhou Toyota, and began production in May 2006 with the Aurion-based Camry model. The company began producing the Yaris in May 2008, the Highlander SUV in May 2009, the Camry Hybrid in April 2010, the E’Z in June 2011 and the Levin in July 2014. The company was then renamed to GAC Toyota in December 2008. GAC Toyota covers an area of 1.87 million square meters and has a construction area of 440,000 square meters. As of June 2010, there are more than 6,800 employees.

== Subsidiary ==
- GAC Toyota Engine Co., Ltd. (GTE)

== Products ==
=== Current models ===
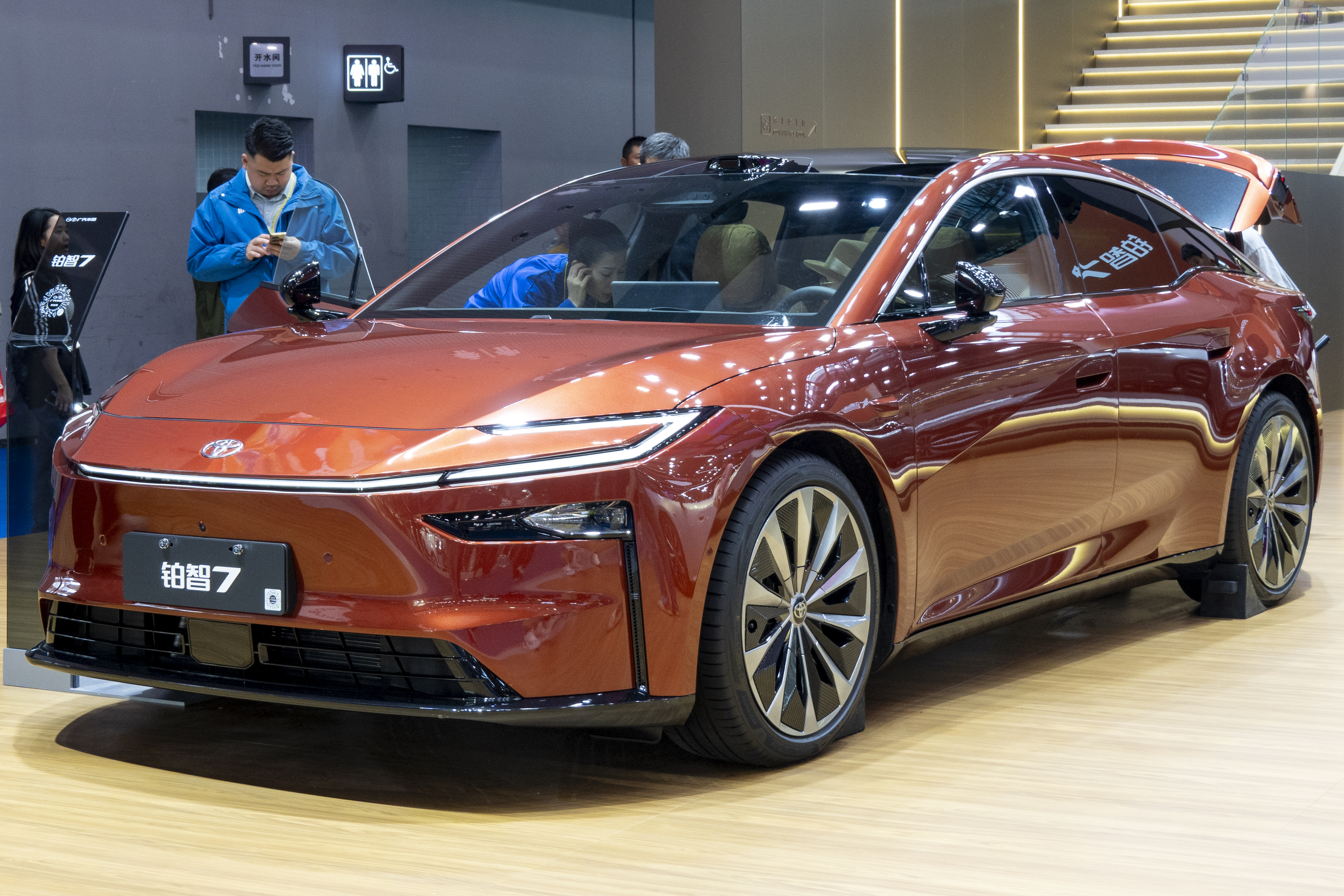
2026–present
广汽丰田鉑智7
GAC Toyota bZ7

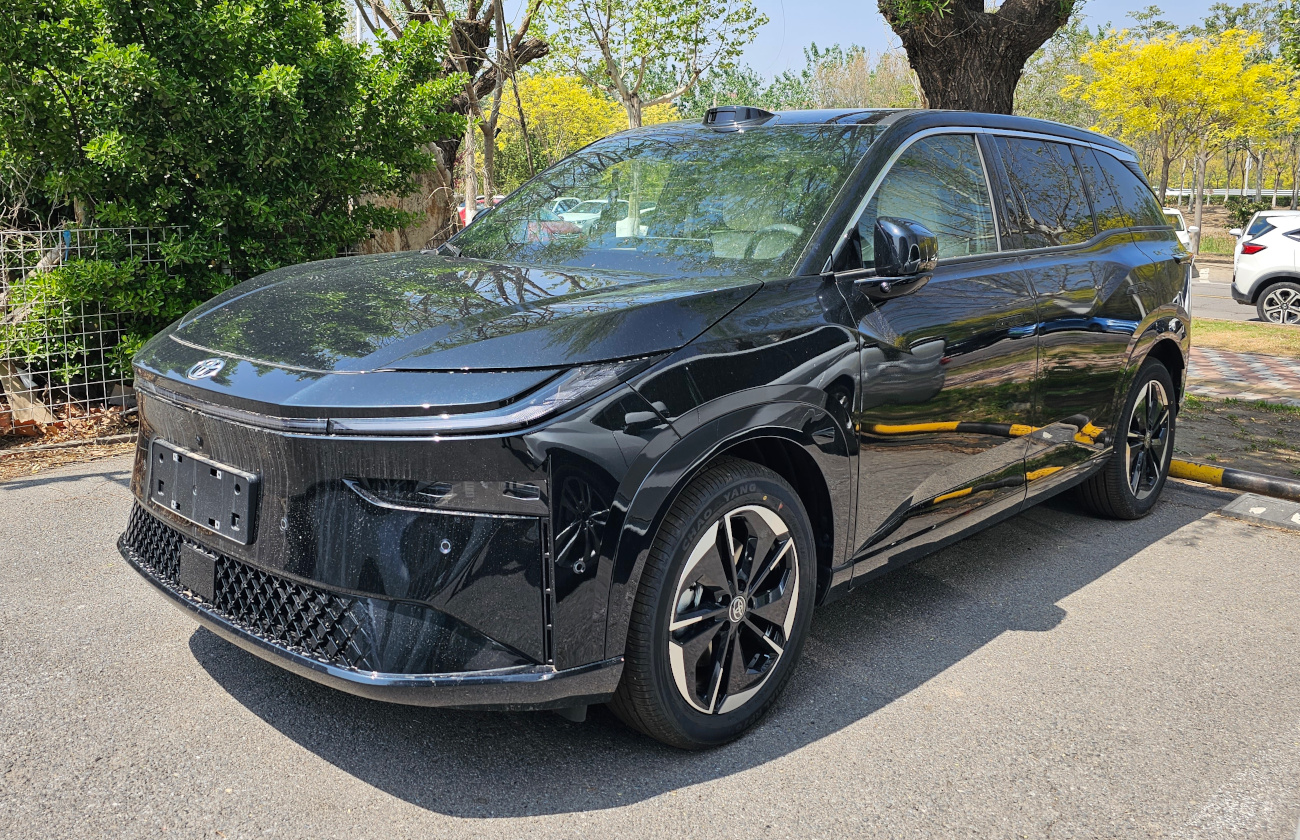
2025–present
广汽丰田鉑智3X
GAC Toyota bZ3X

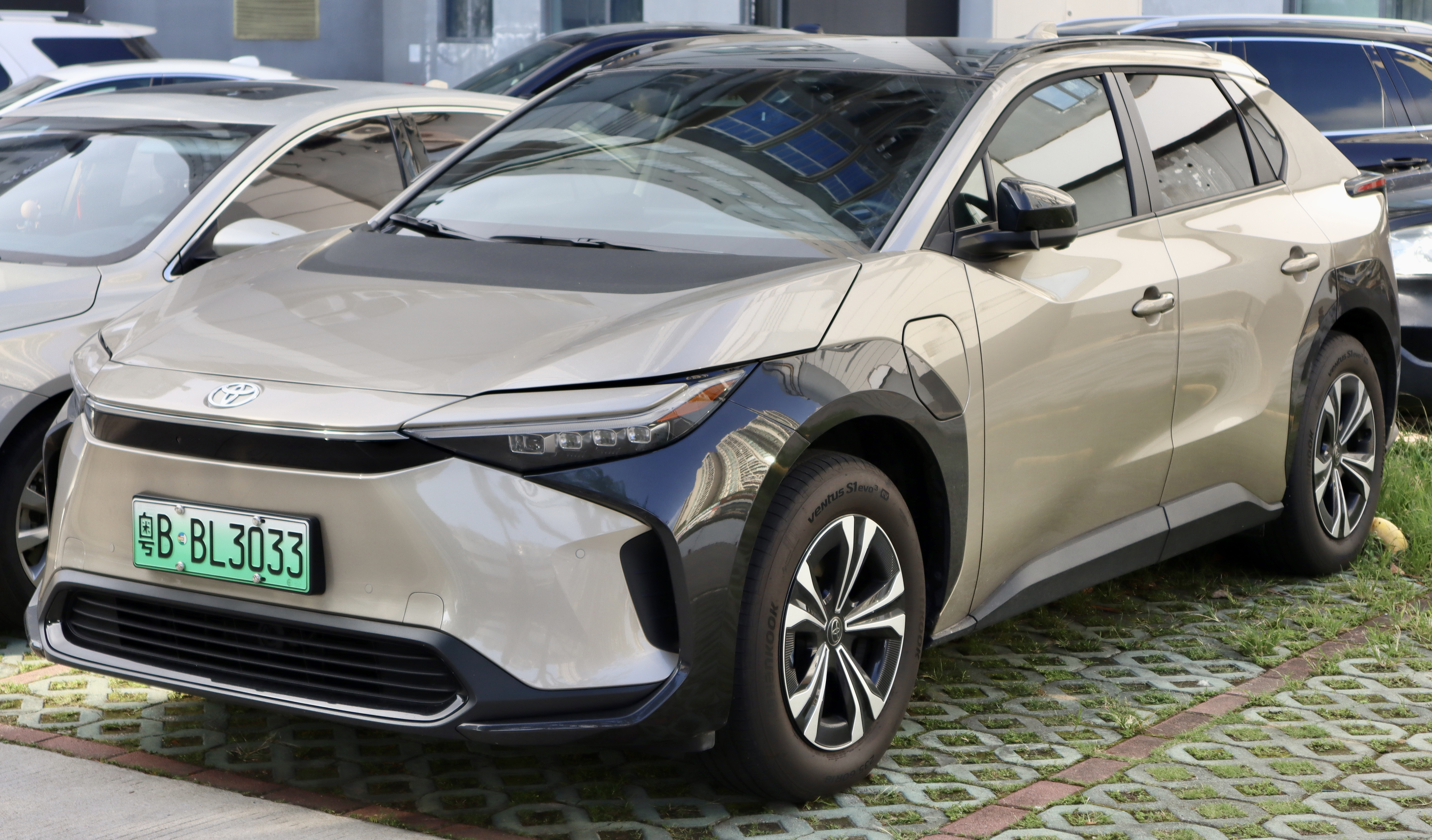
2022–present
广汽丰田鉑智4X
GAC Toyota bZ4X

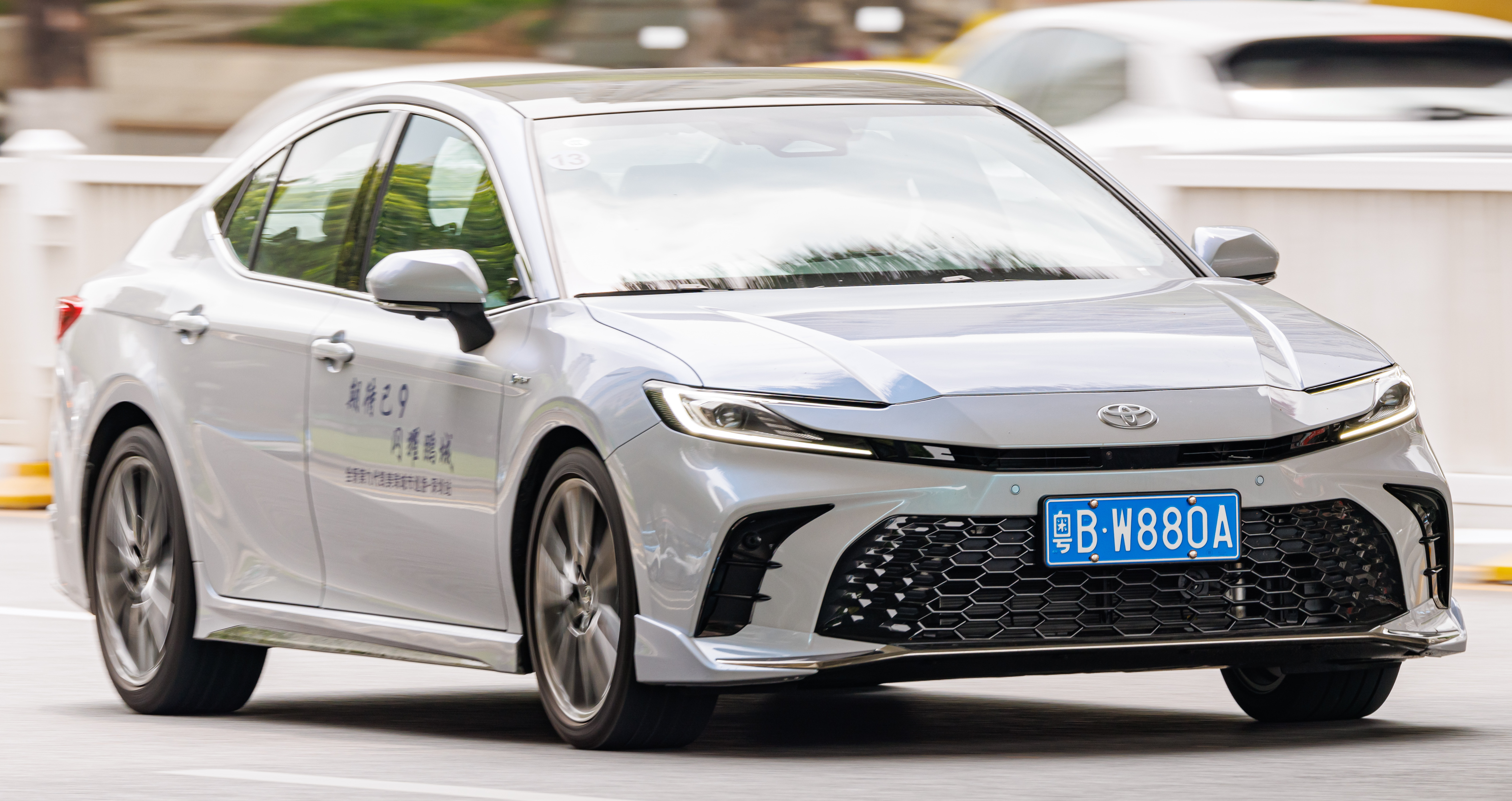
2023–present
广汽丰田凯美瑞
GAC Toyota Camry

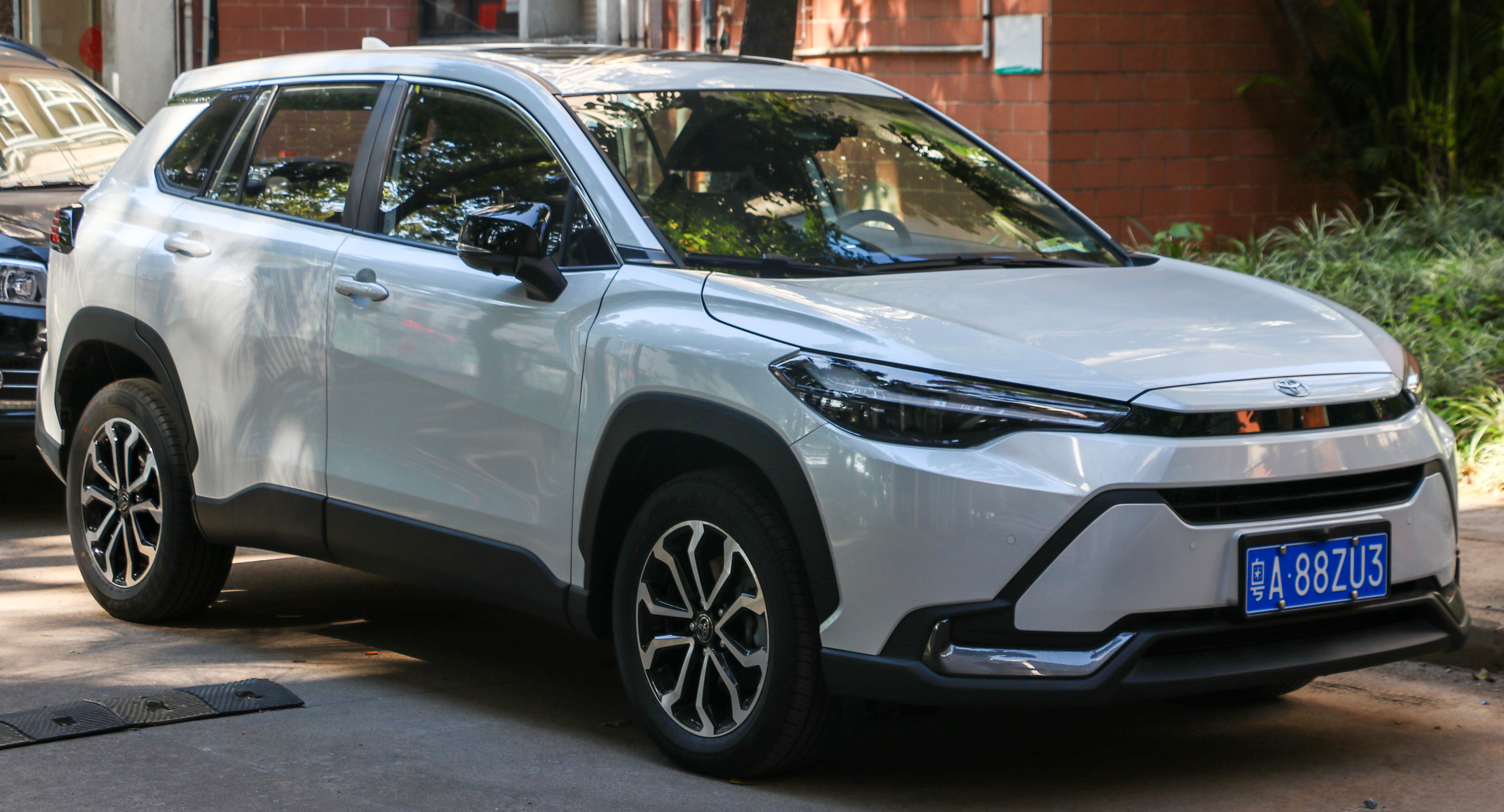
2025–present
广汽丰田锋兰达
GAC Toyota Frontlander

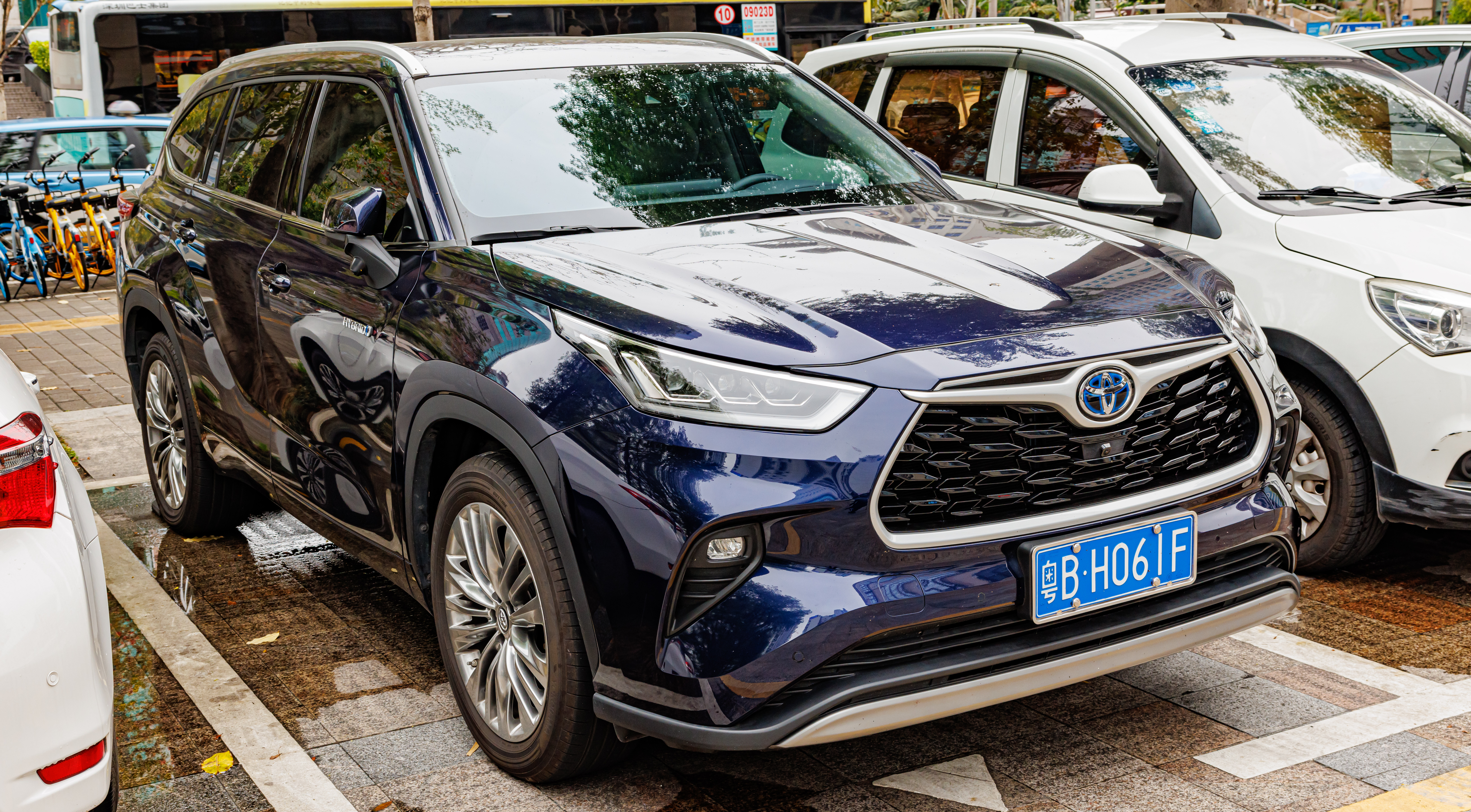
2020–present
广汽丰田汉兰达
GAC Toyota Highlander

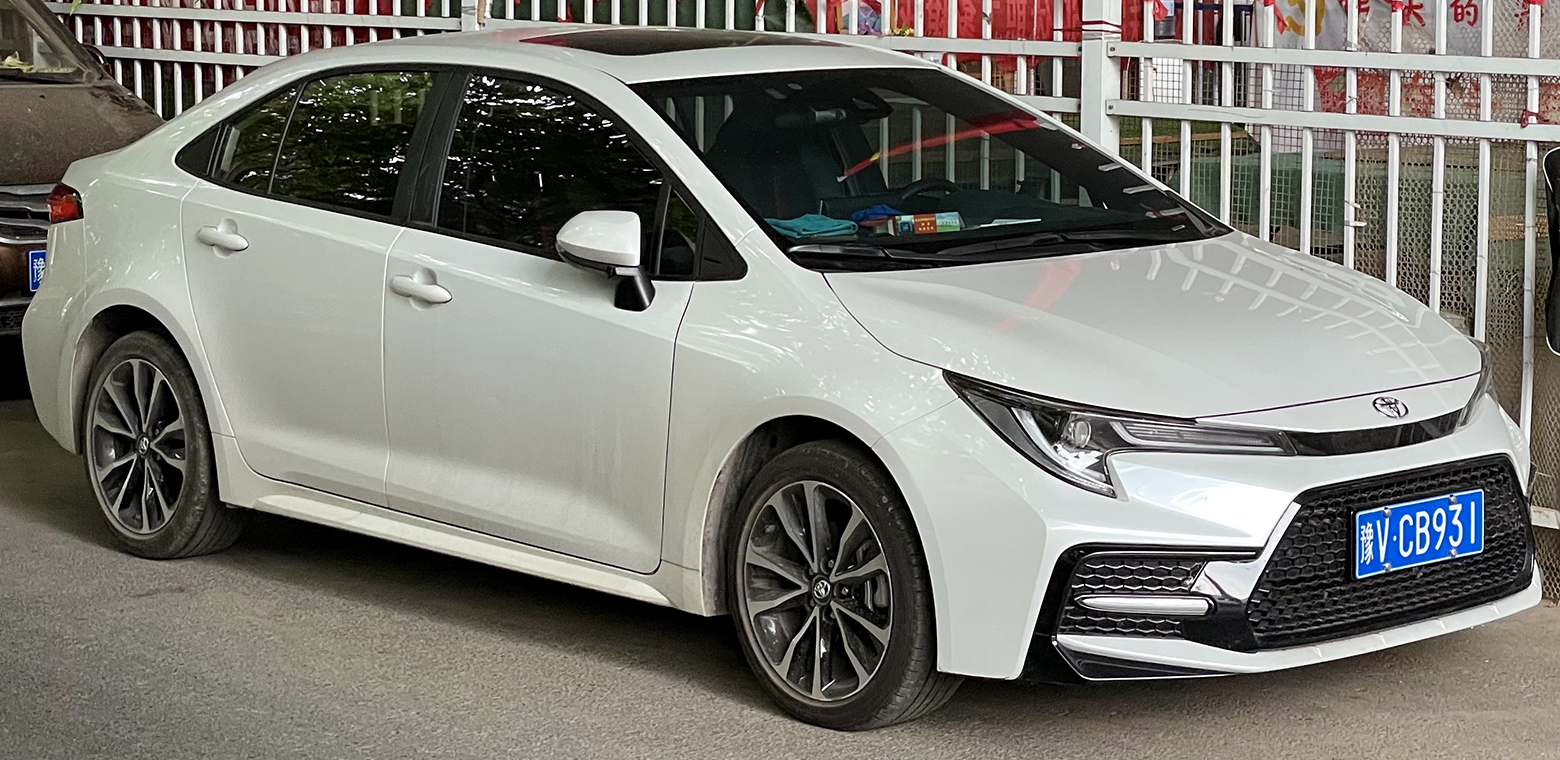
2019–present
广汽丰田雷凌L
GAC Toyota Levin L

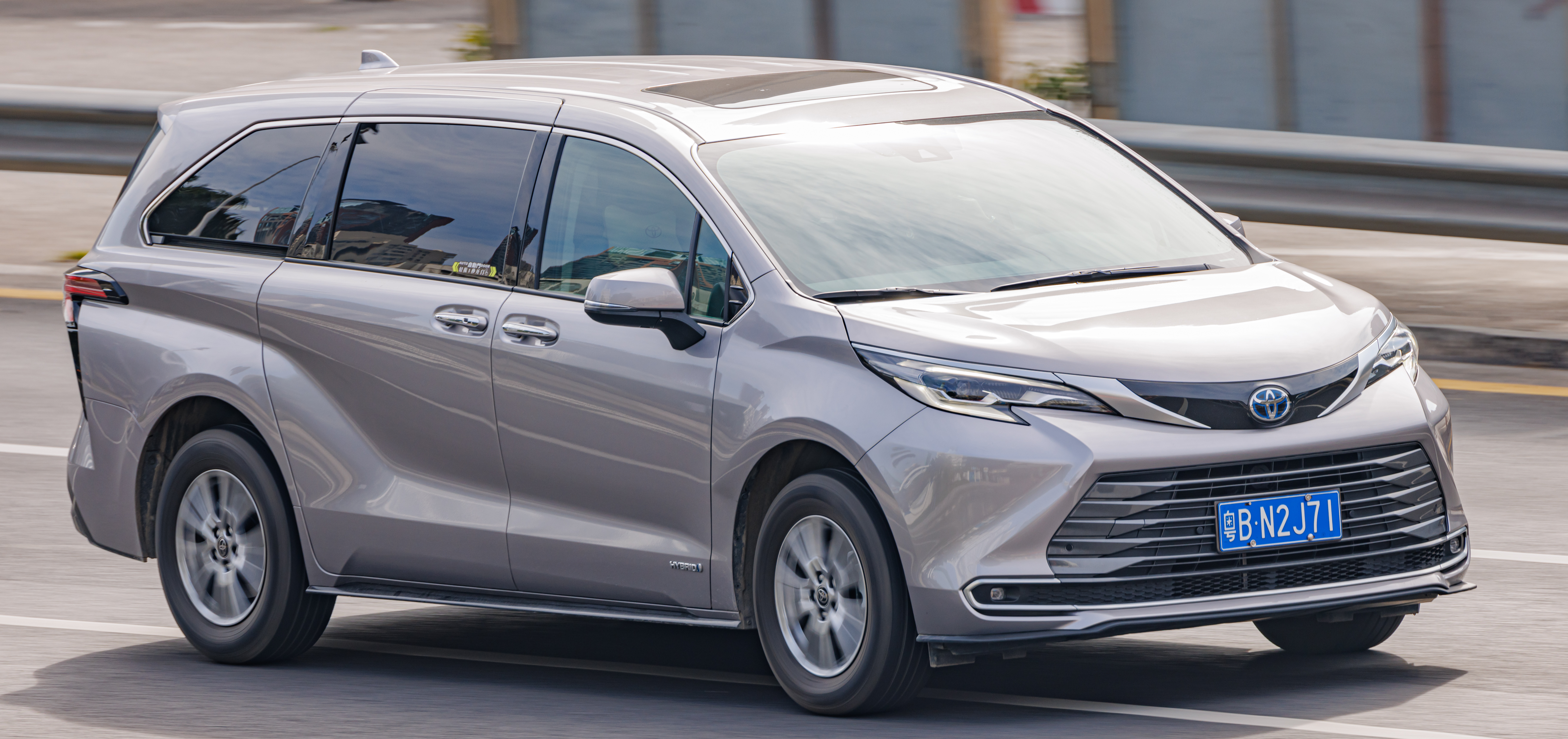
2021–present
广汽丰田赛那
GAC Toyota Sienna

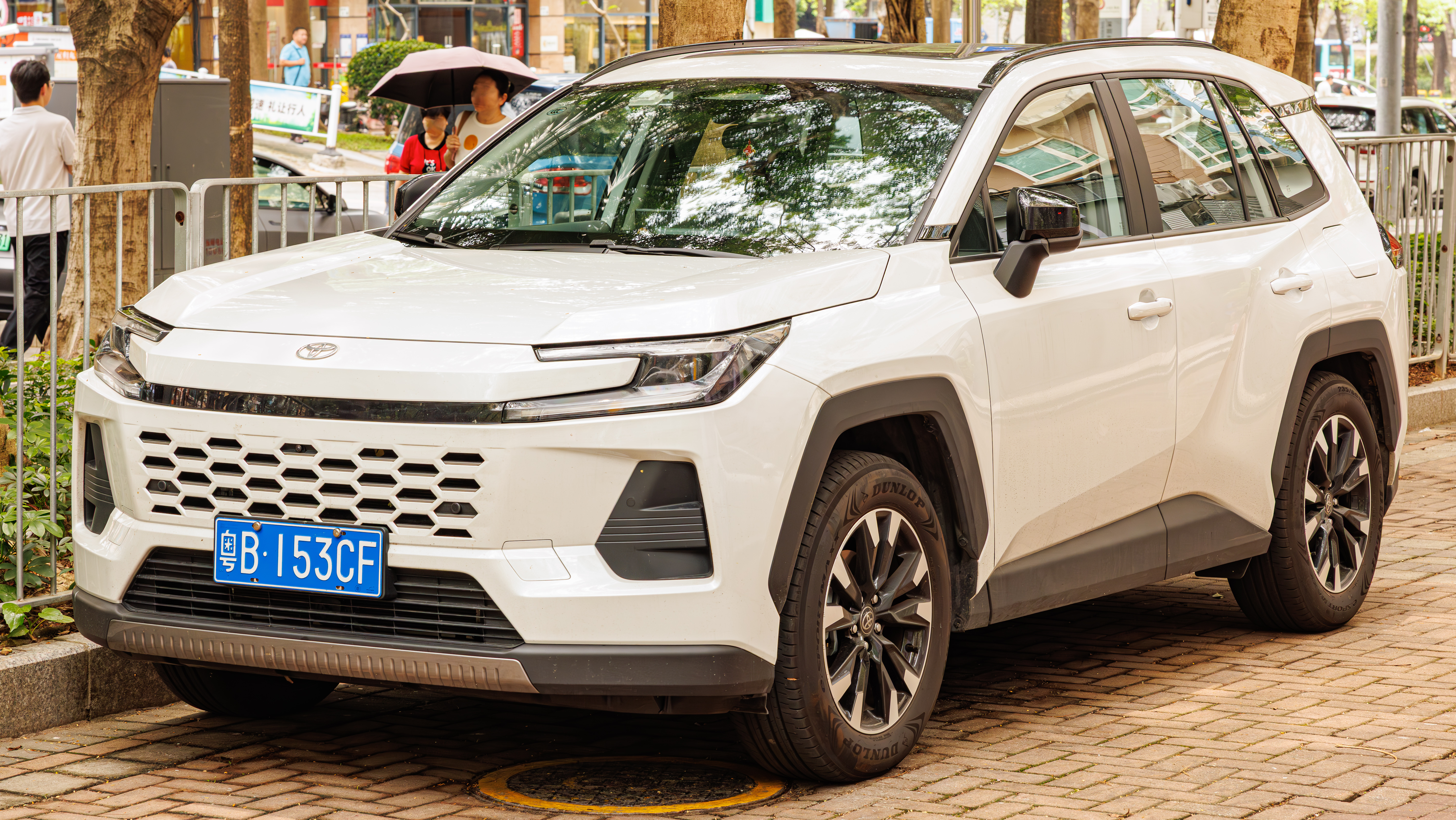
2025–present
广汽丰田威兰达
GAC Toyota Wildlander

=== Current imported models ===
2023–present
丰田埃尔法AH40
Toyota Alphard AH40

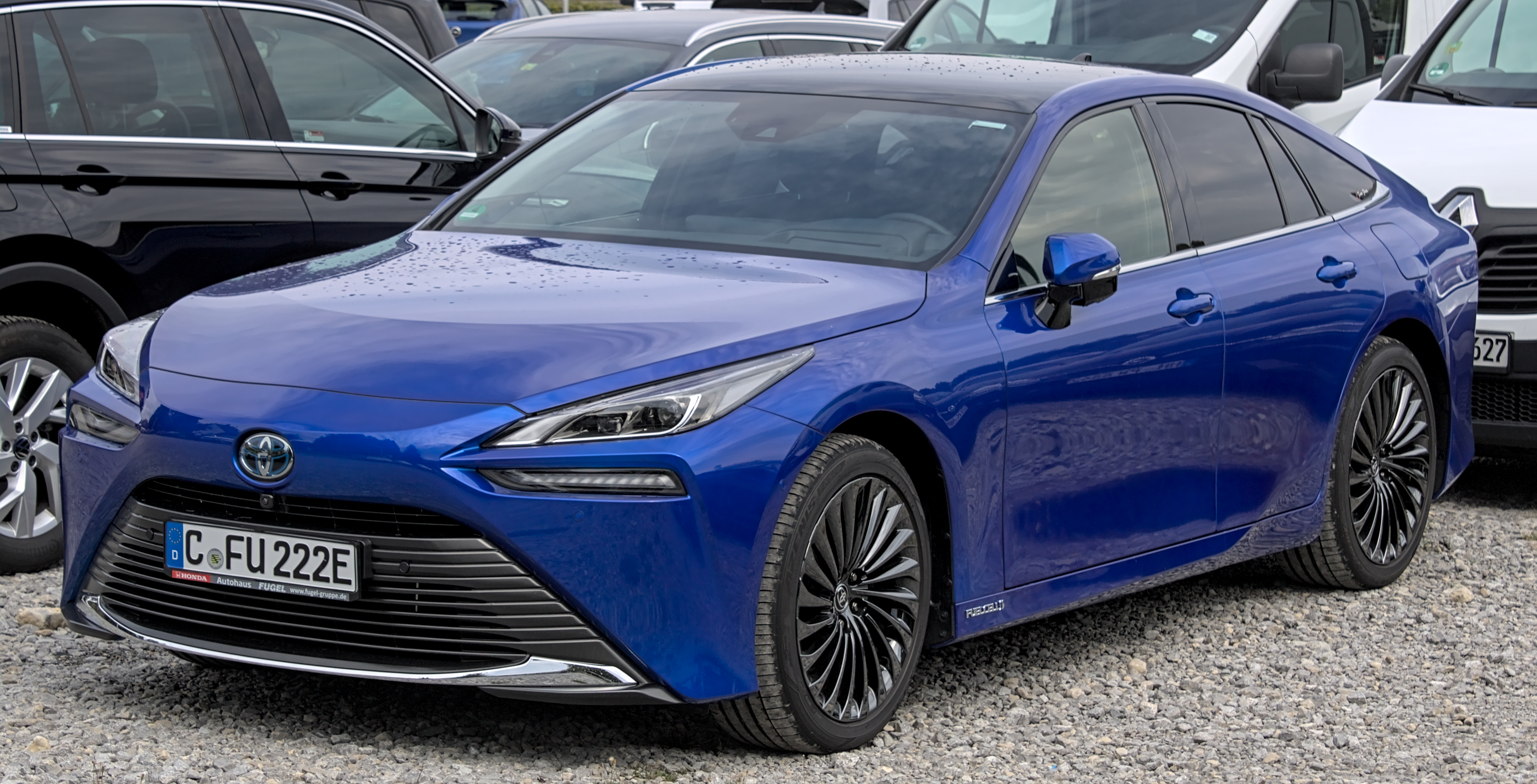
2023–present
丰田Miral JPD20
Toyota Mirai JPD20

=== Former models ===
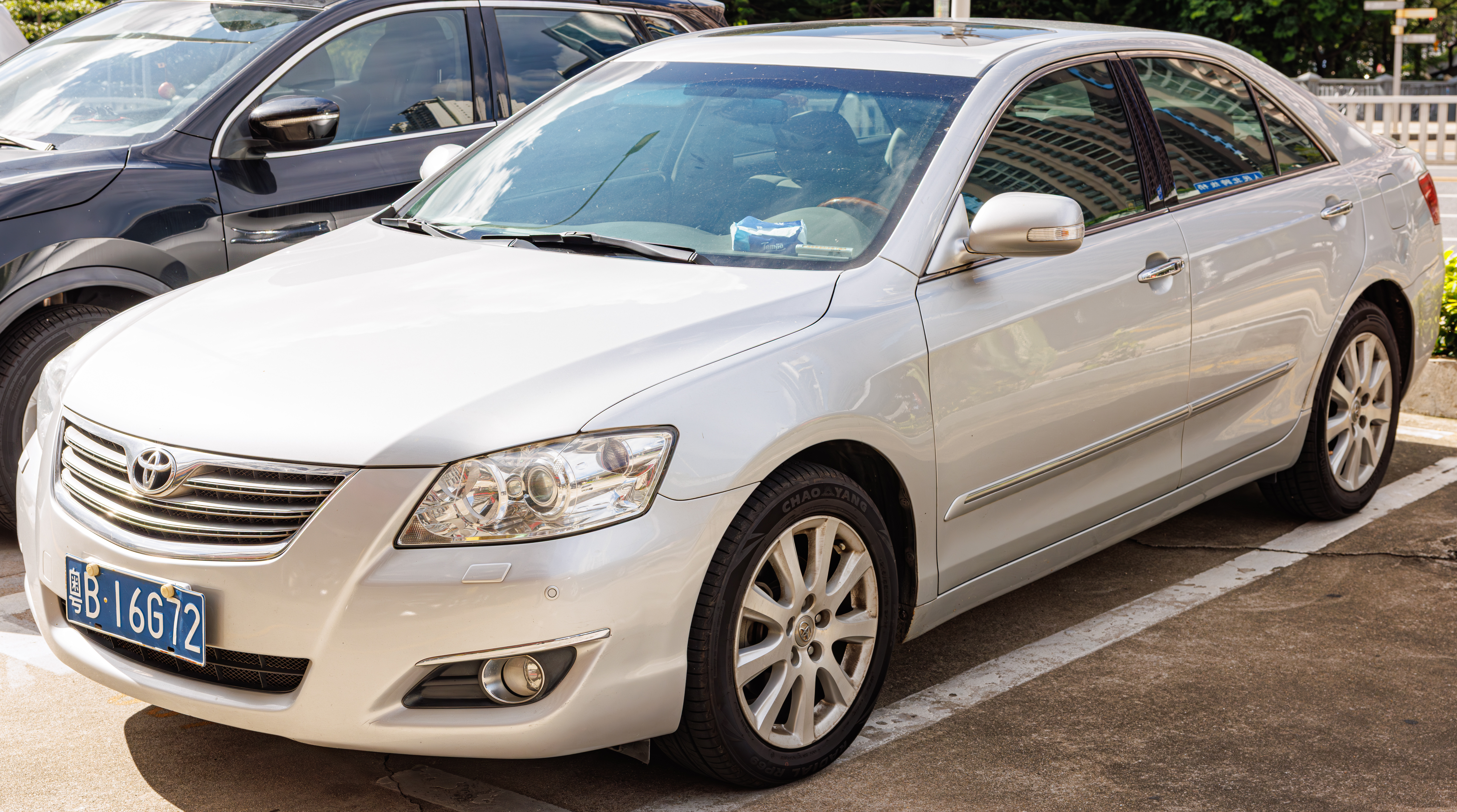
2006–2009
广汽丰田凯美瑞
GAC Toyota Camry

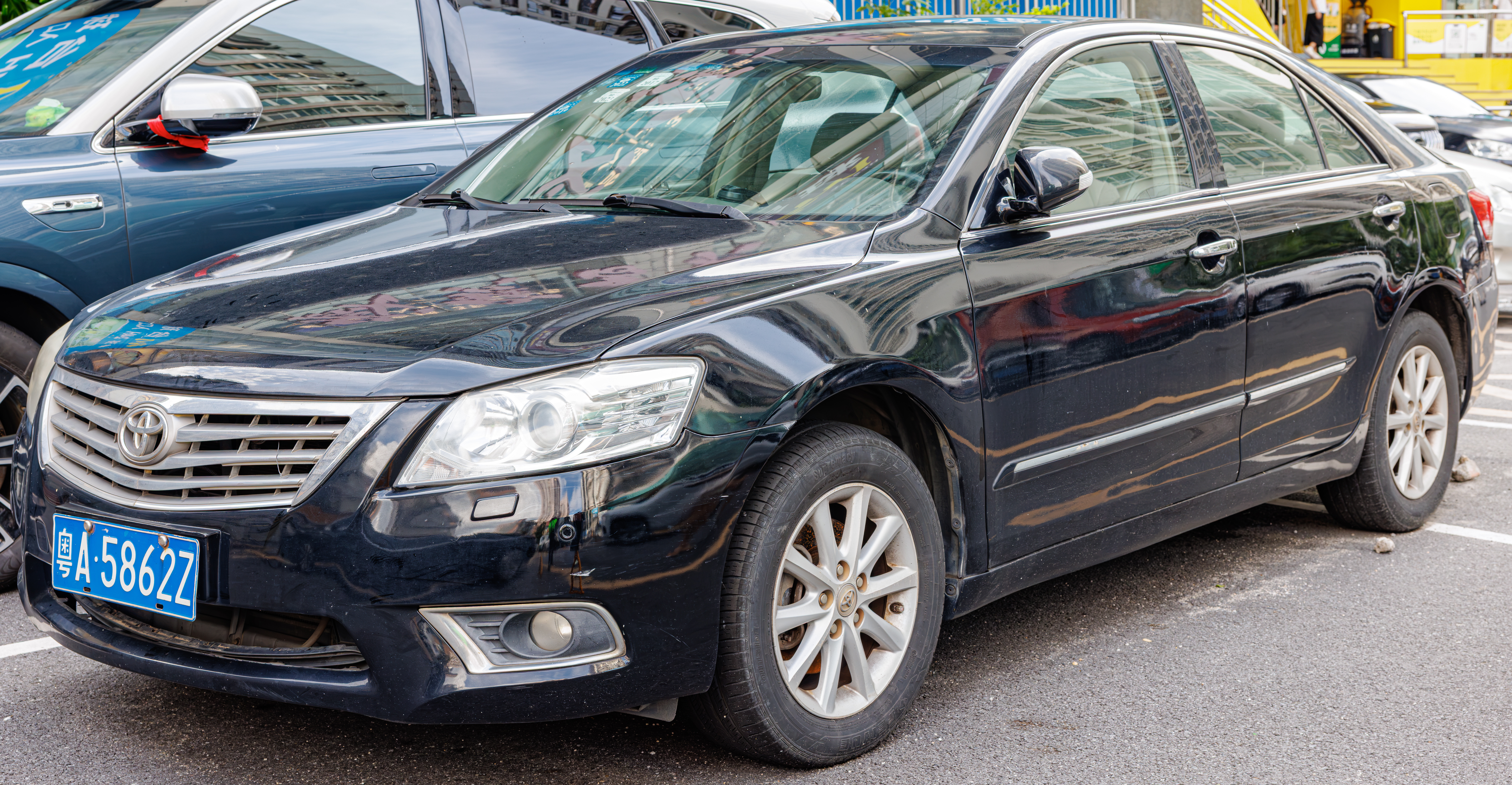
2009–2013
广汽丰田凯美瑞
GAC Toyota Camry

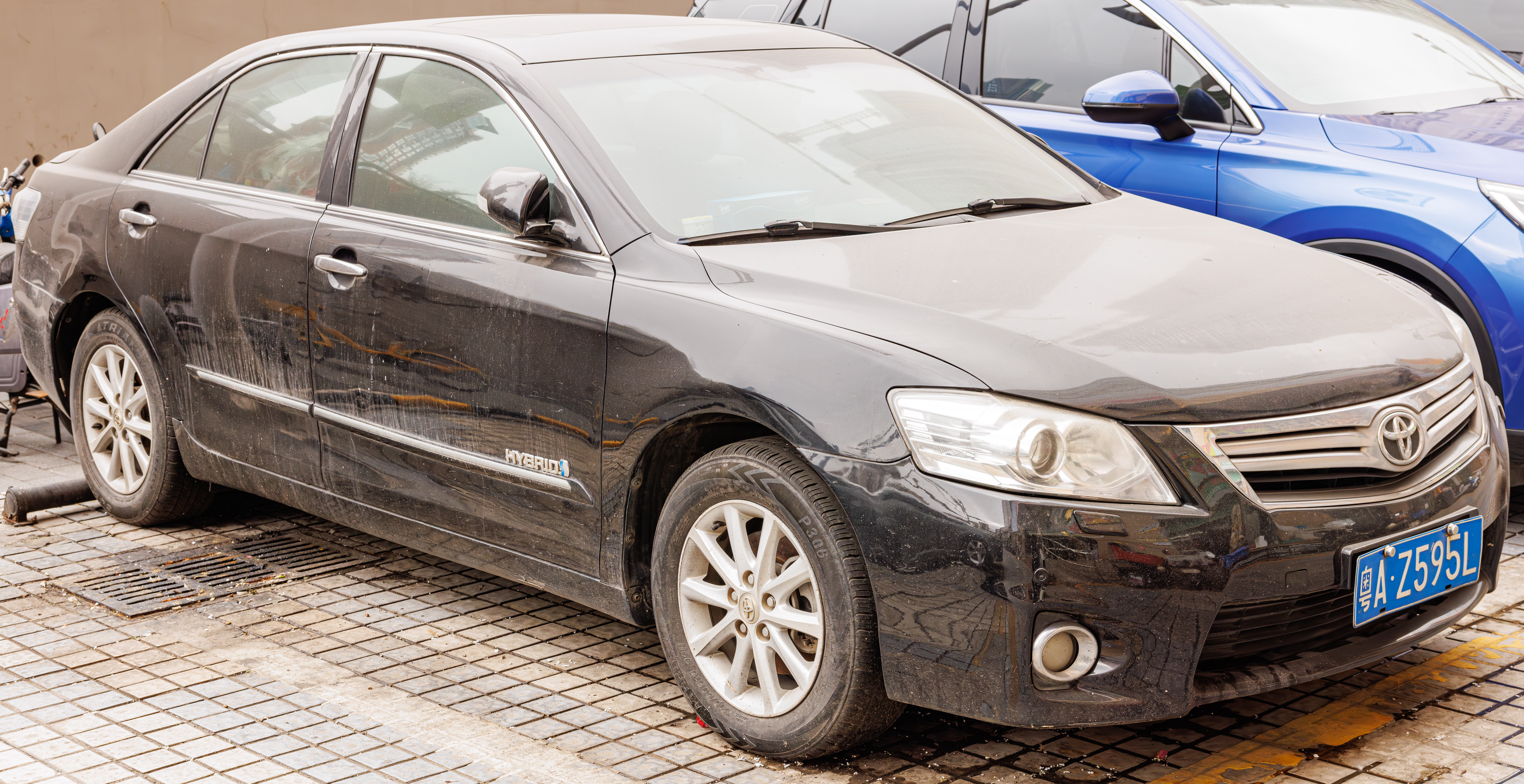
2010–2011
丰田凯美瑞混合动力XV40
GAC Toyota Camry Hybrid

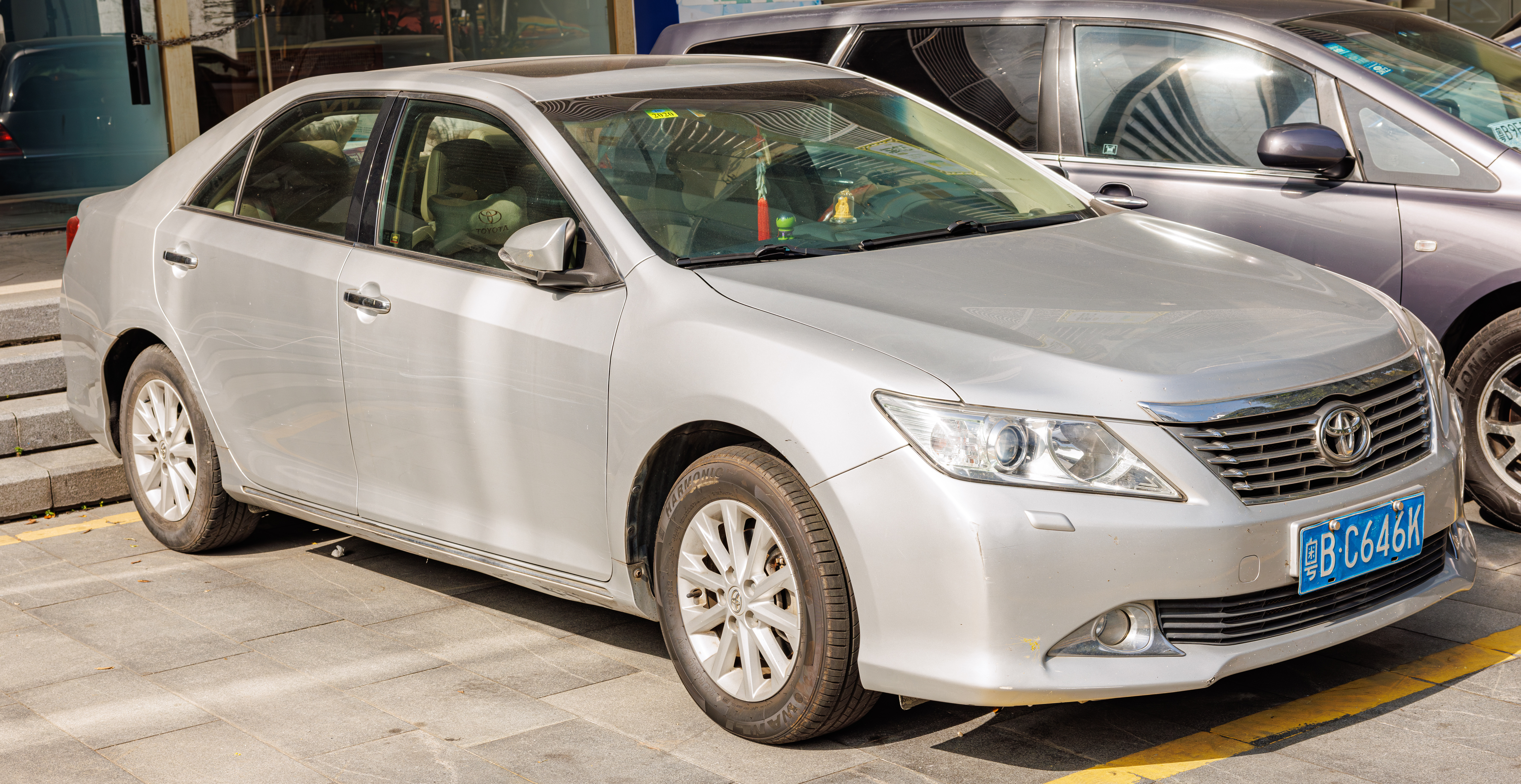
2011–2014
广汽丰田凯美瑞
GAC Toyota Camry

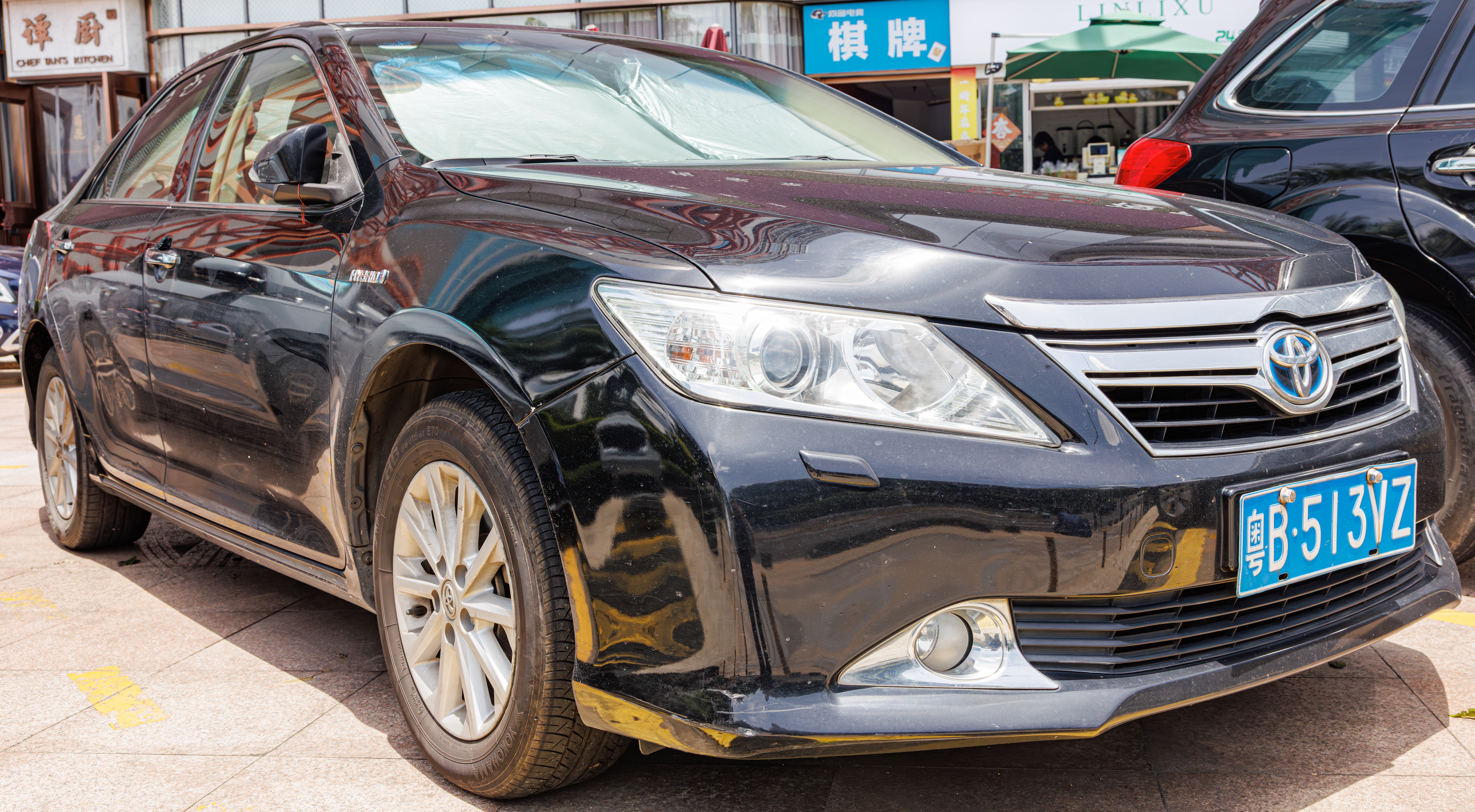
2012–2014
广汽丰田凯美瑞尊瑞
GAC Toyota Camry Hybrid

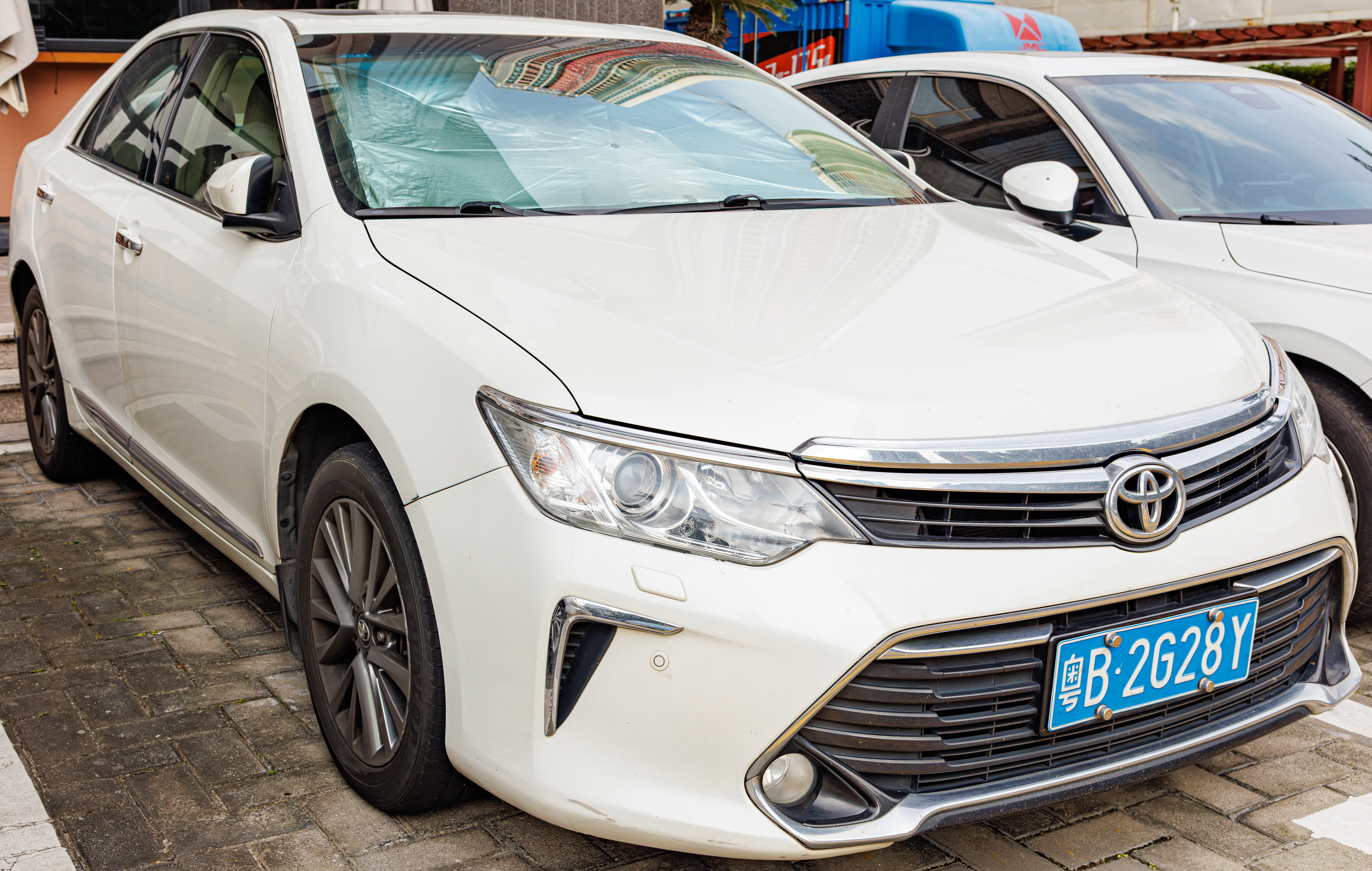
2015–2017
广汽丰田凯美瑞
GAC Toyota Camry

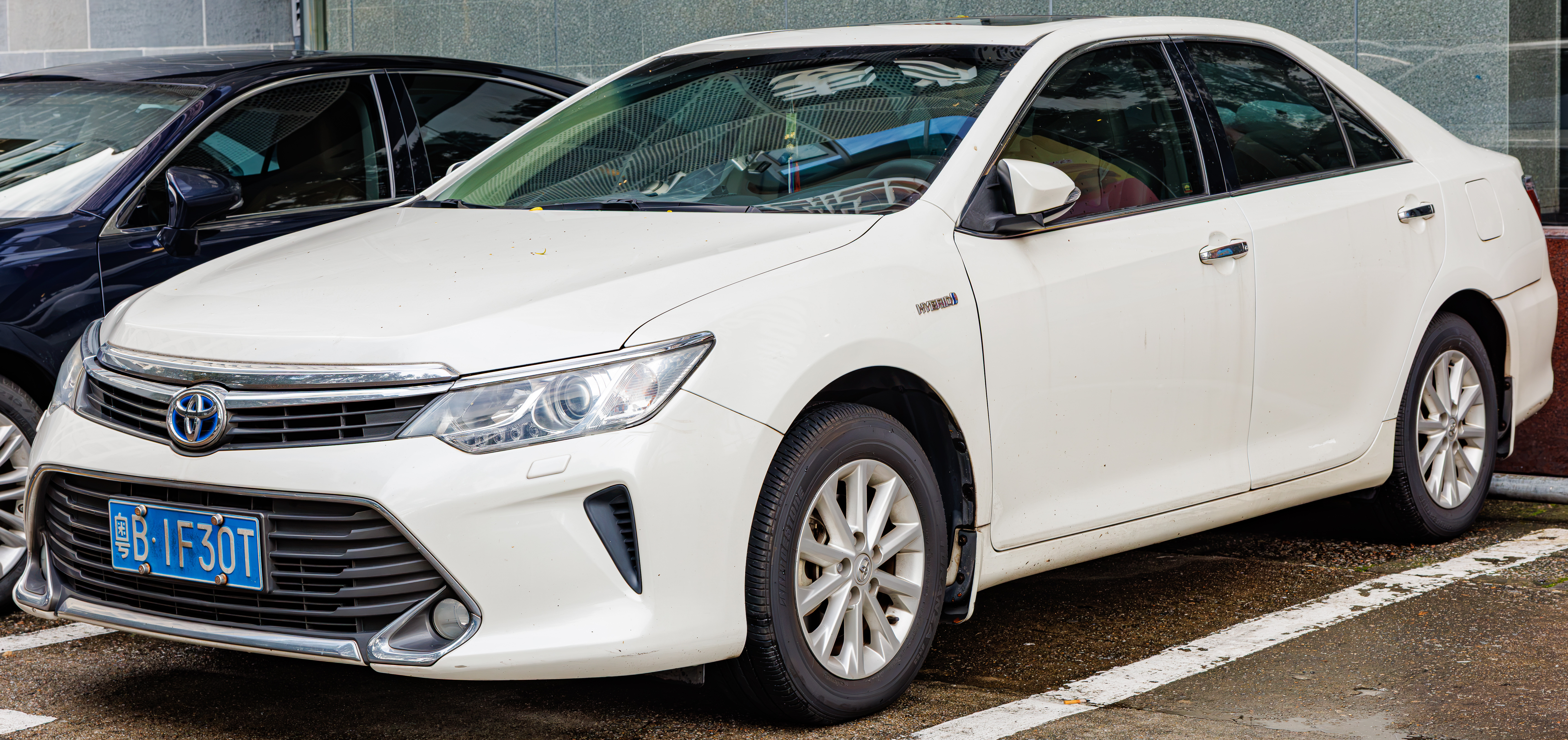
2015–2017
广汽丰田凯美瑞尊瑞
GAC Toyota Camry Hybrid

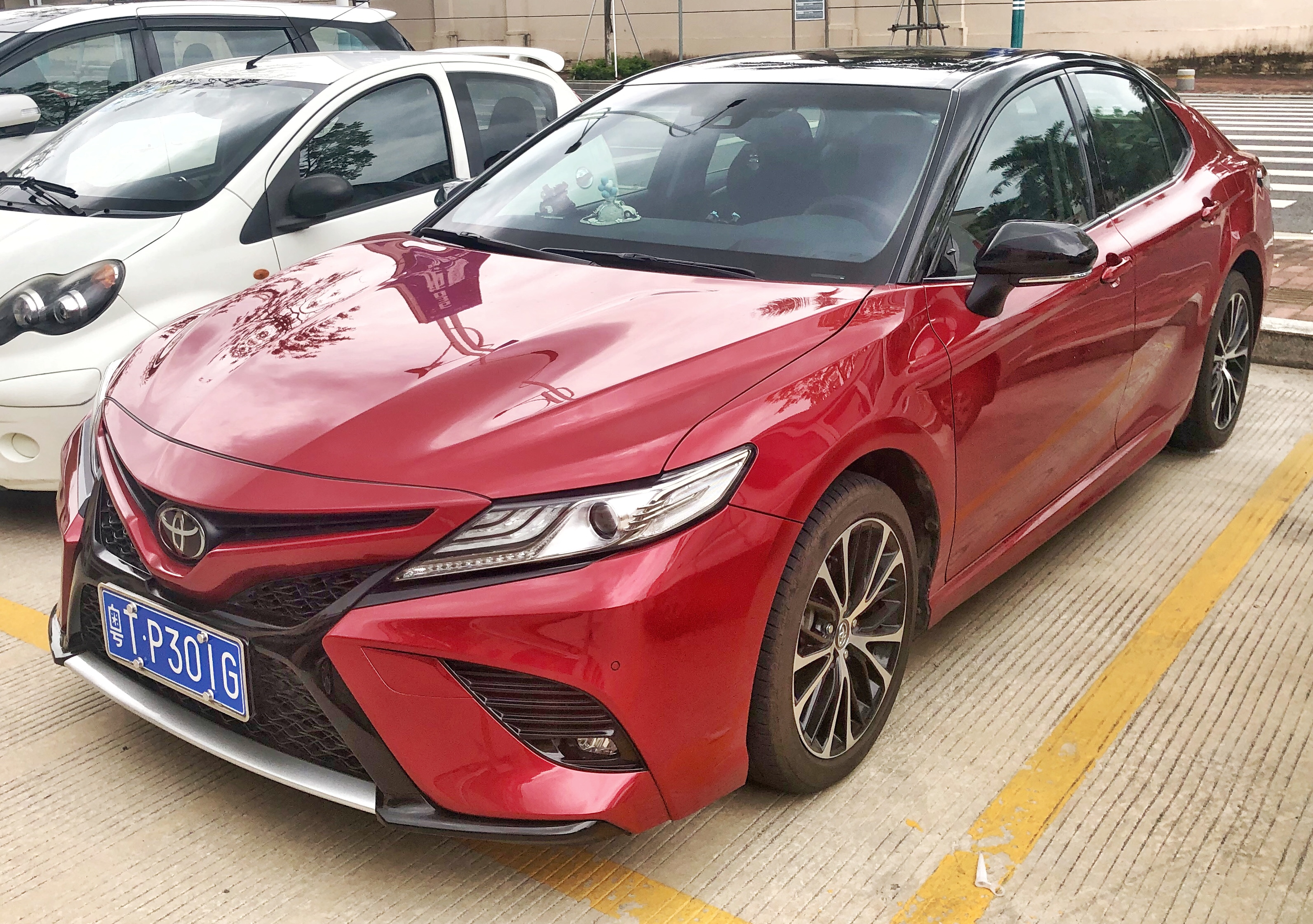
2017–2021
广汽丰田凯美瑞
GAC Toyota Camry

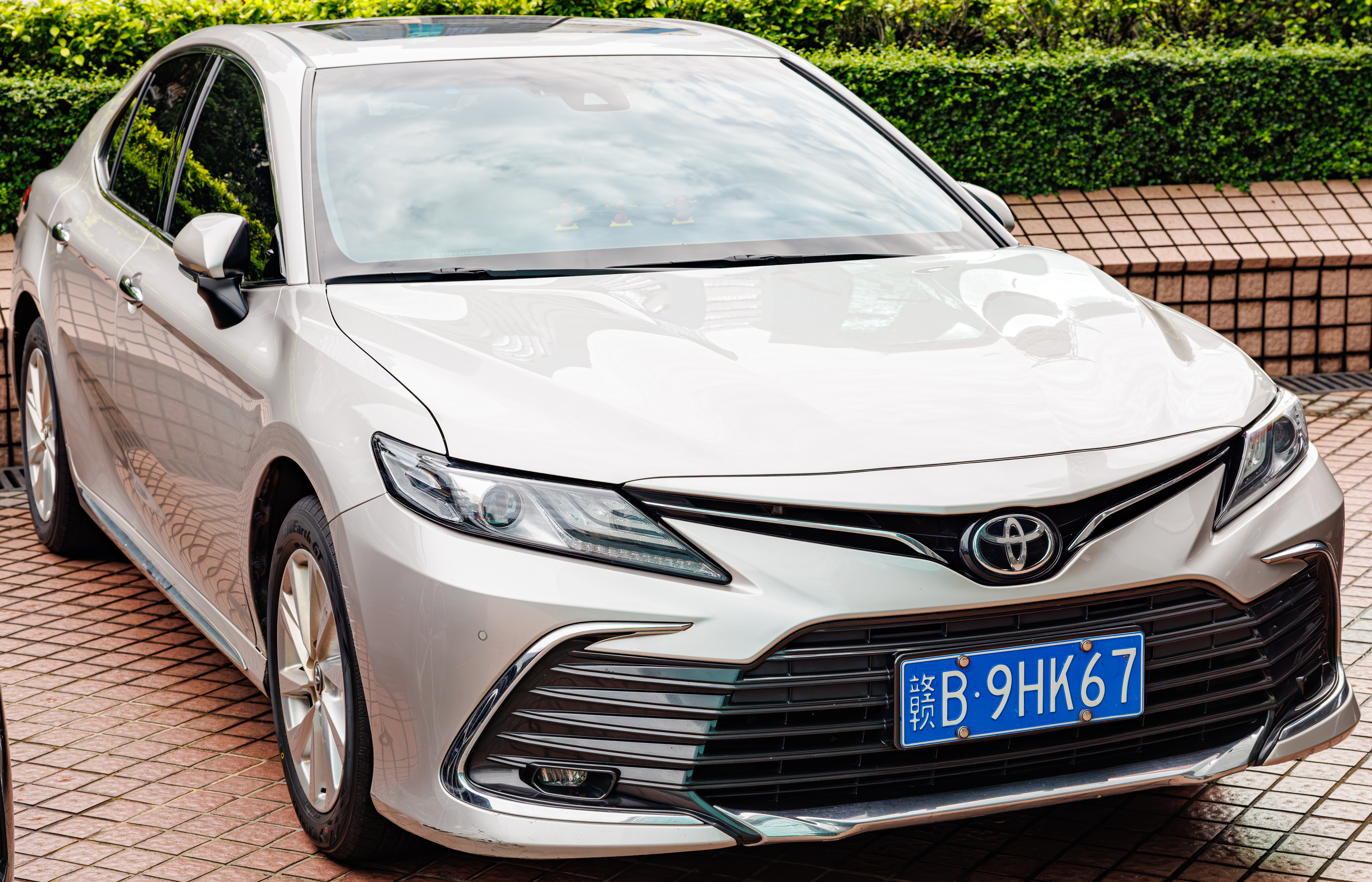
2021–2023
广汽丰田凯美瑞
GAC Toyota Camry

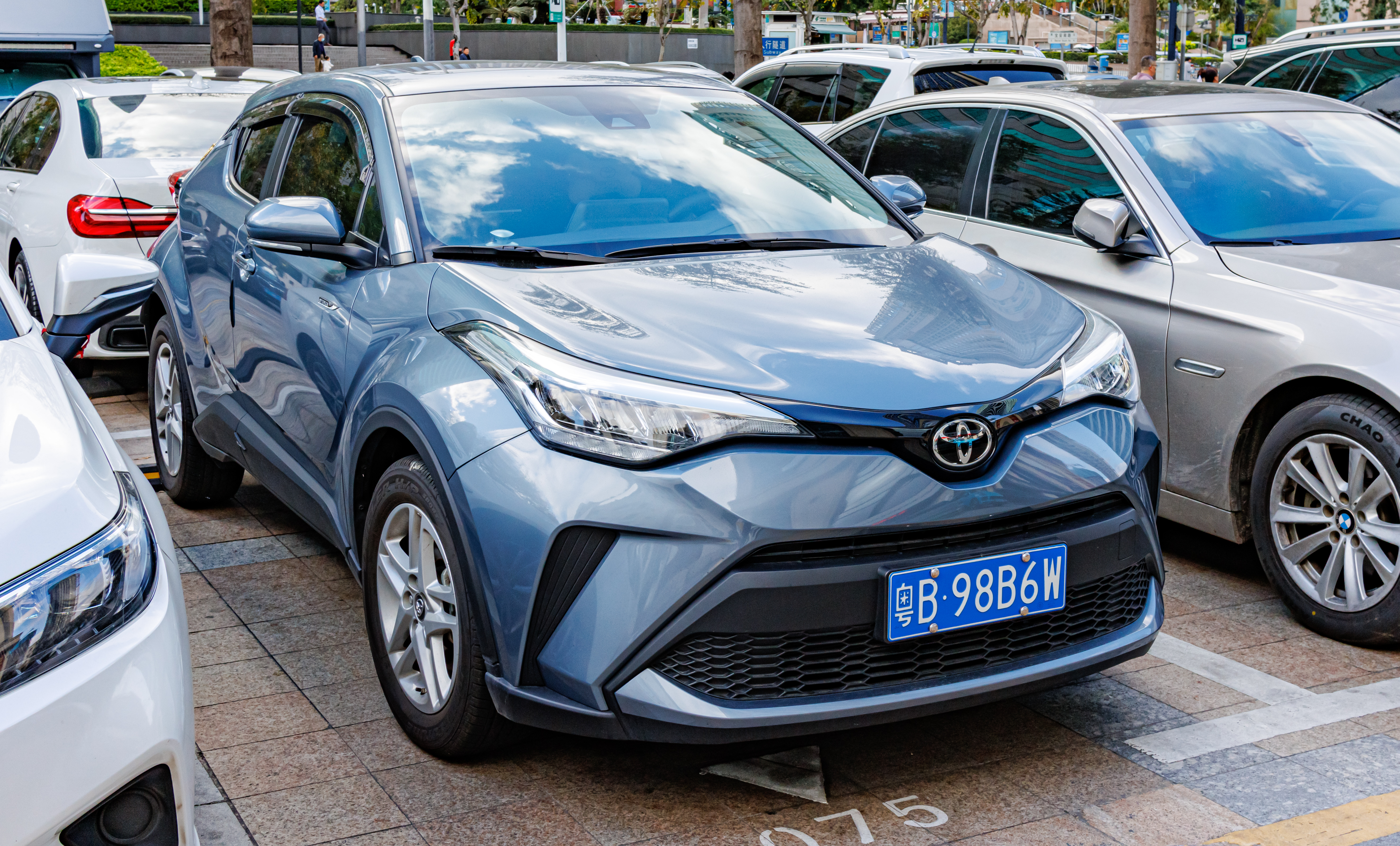
2018–2025
广汽丰田C-HR
GAC Toyota C-HR

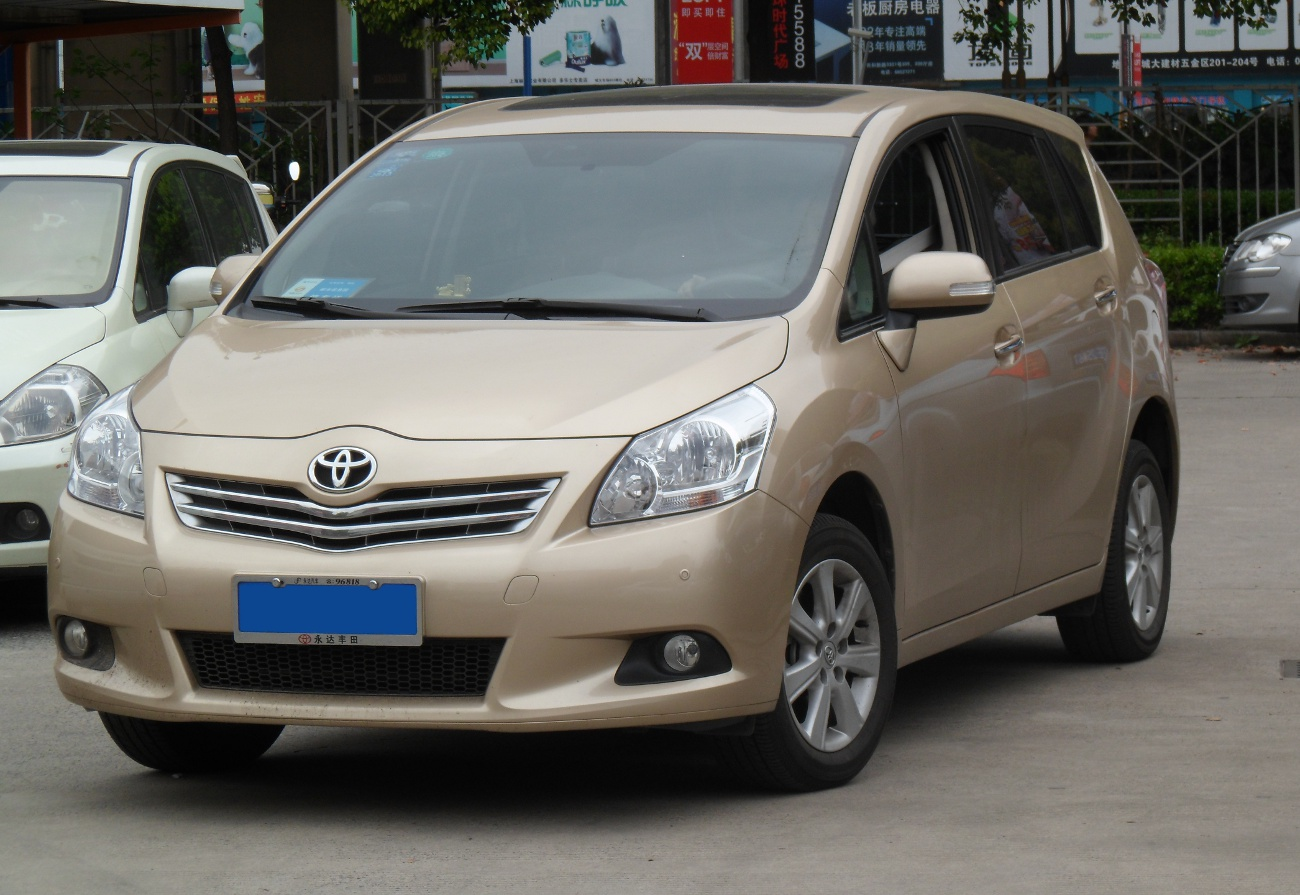
2011–2018
广汽丰田逸致
GAC Toyota E'Z

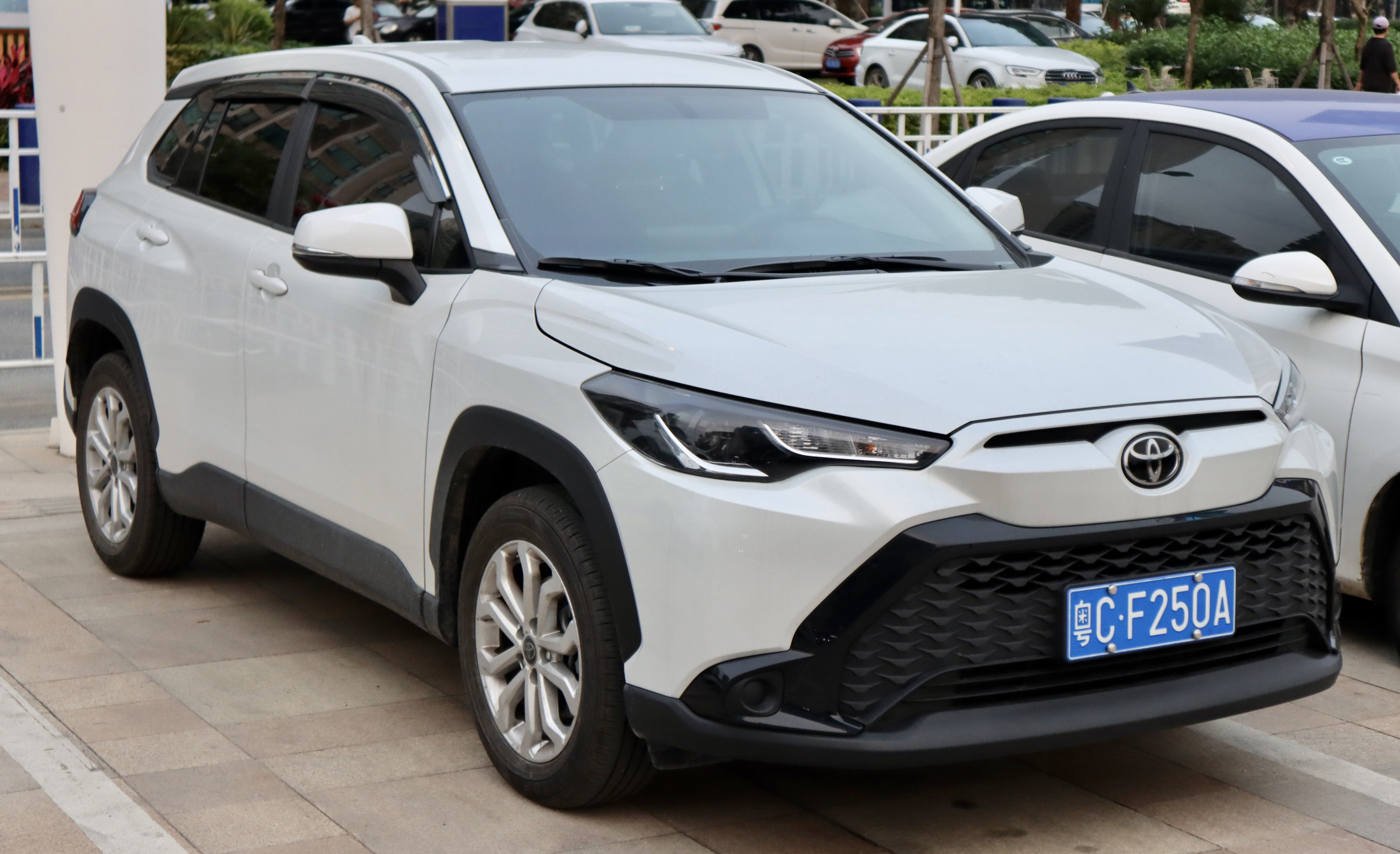
2021–2025
广汽丰田锋兰达
GAC Toyota Frontlander

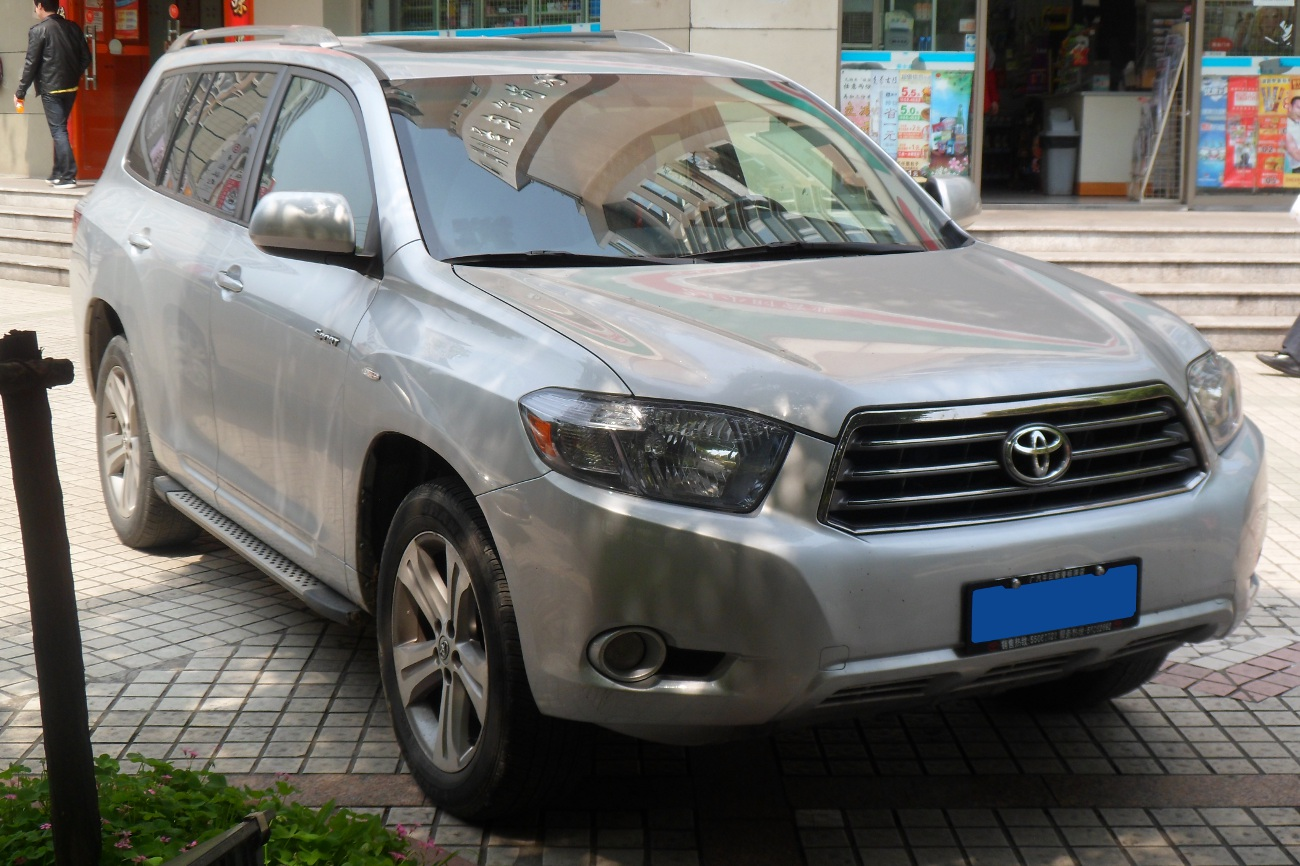
2009–2012
广汽丰田汉兰达
GAC Toyota Highlander

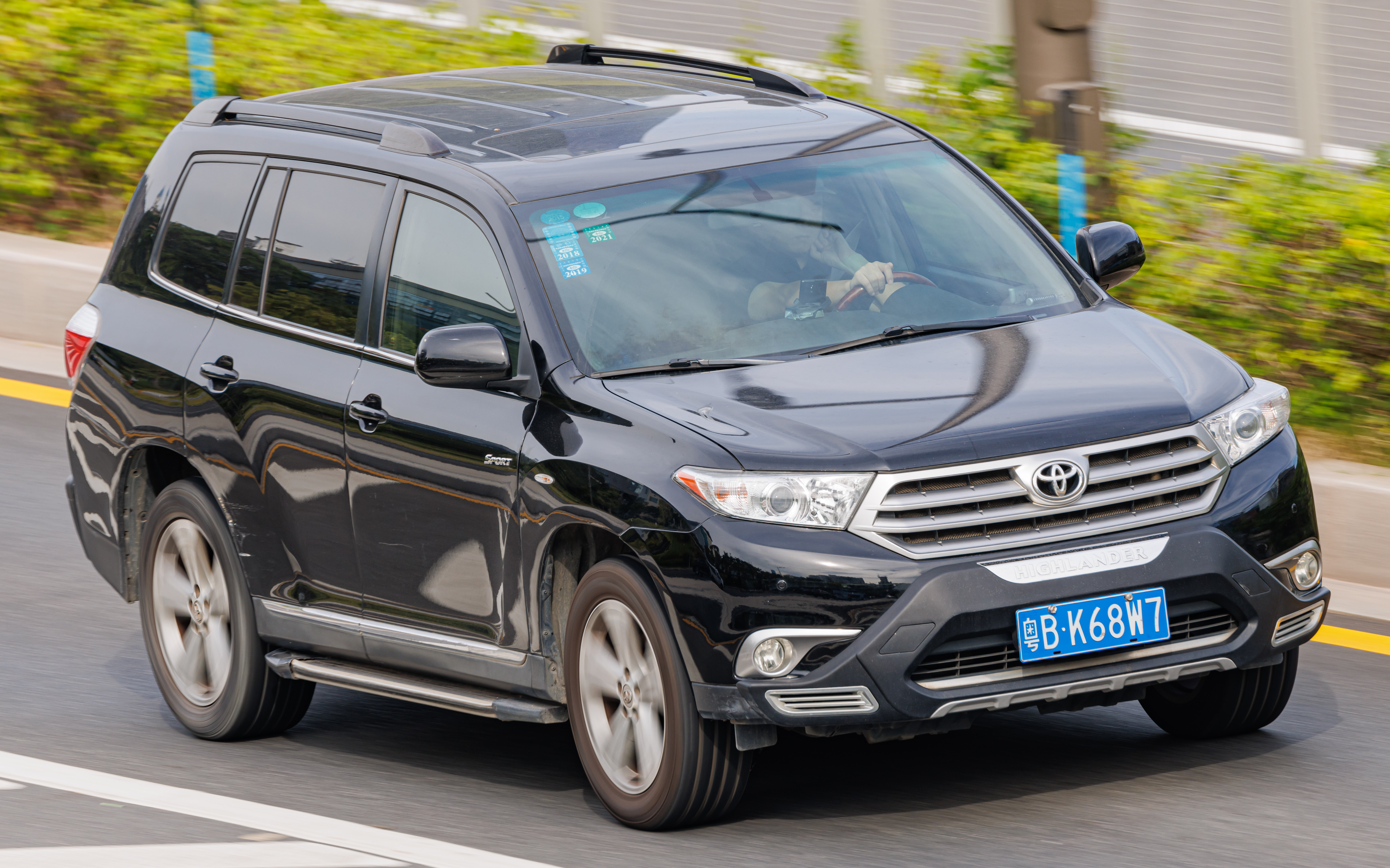
2012–2015
广汽丰田汉兰达
GAC Toyota Highlander

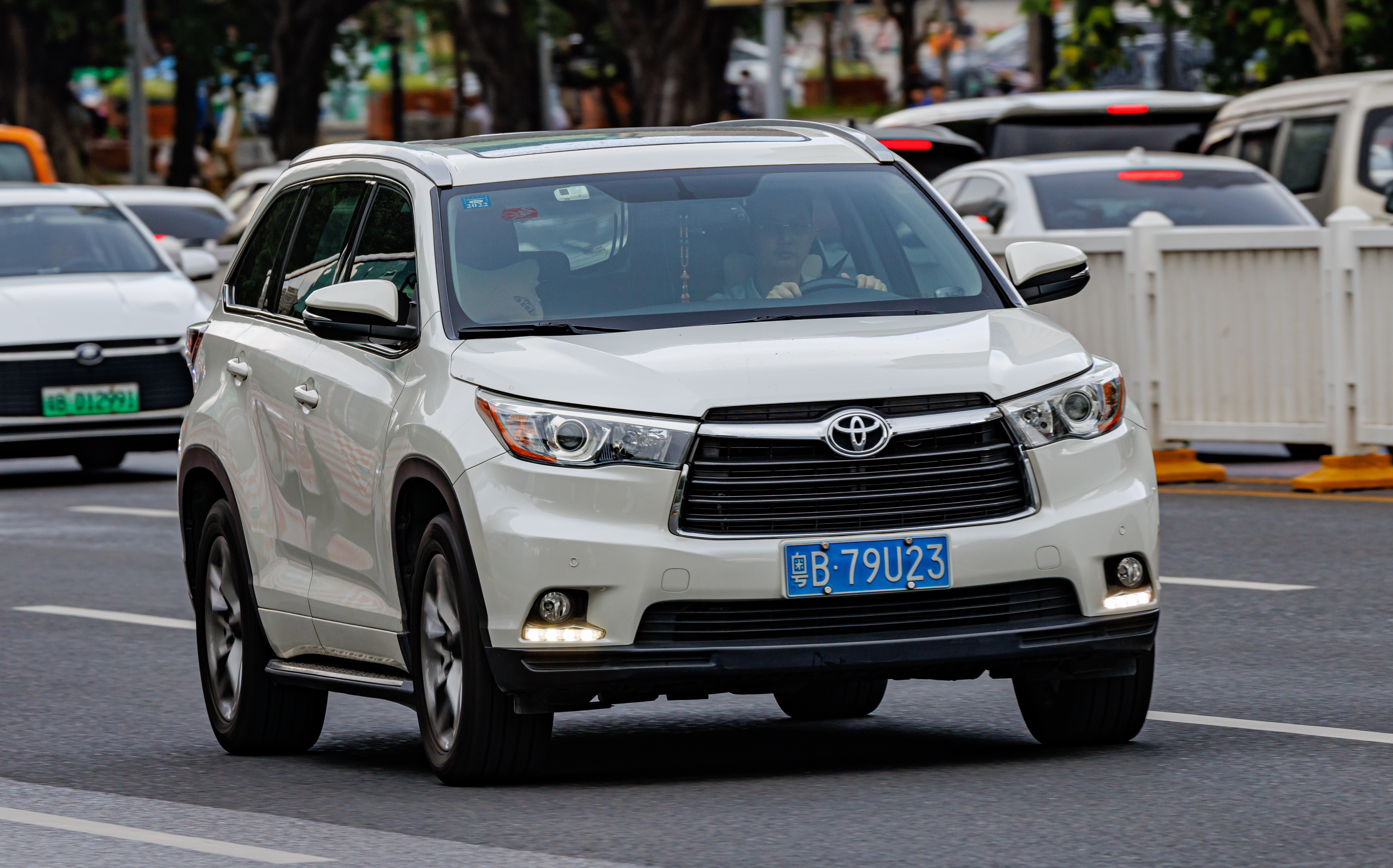
2015–2018
广汽丰田汉兰达
GAC Toyota Highlander

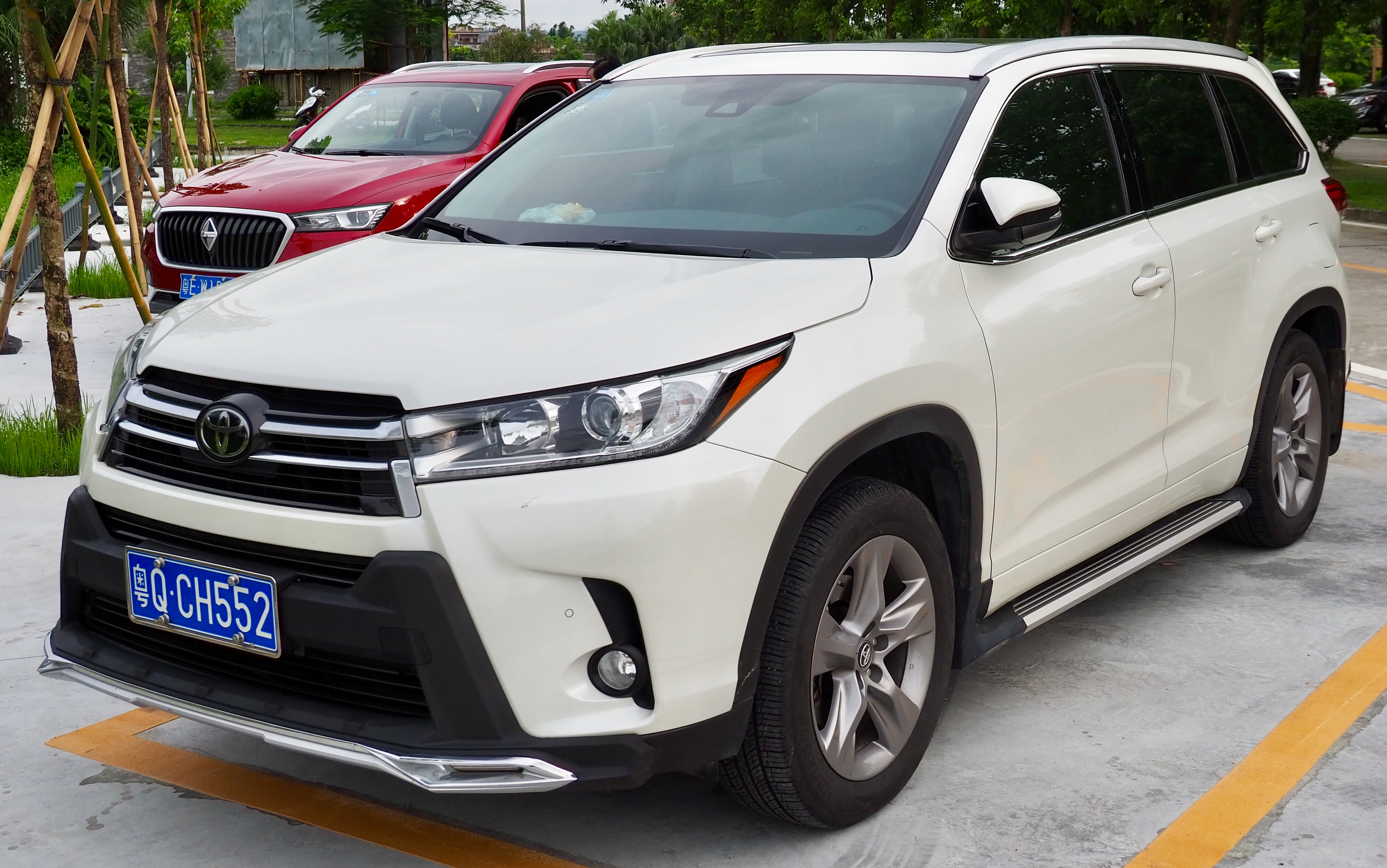
2018–2021
广汽丰田汉兰达
GAC Toyota Highlander

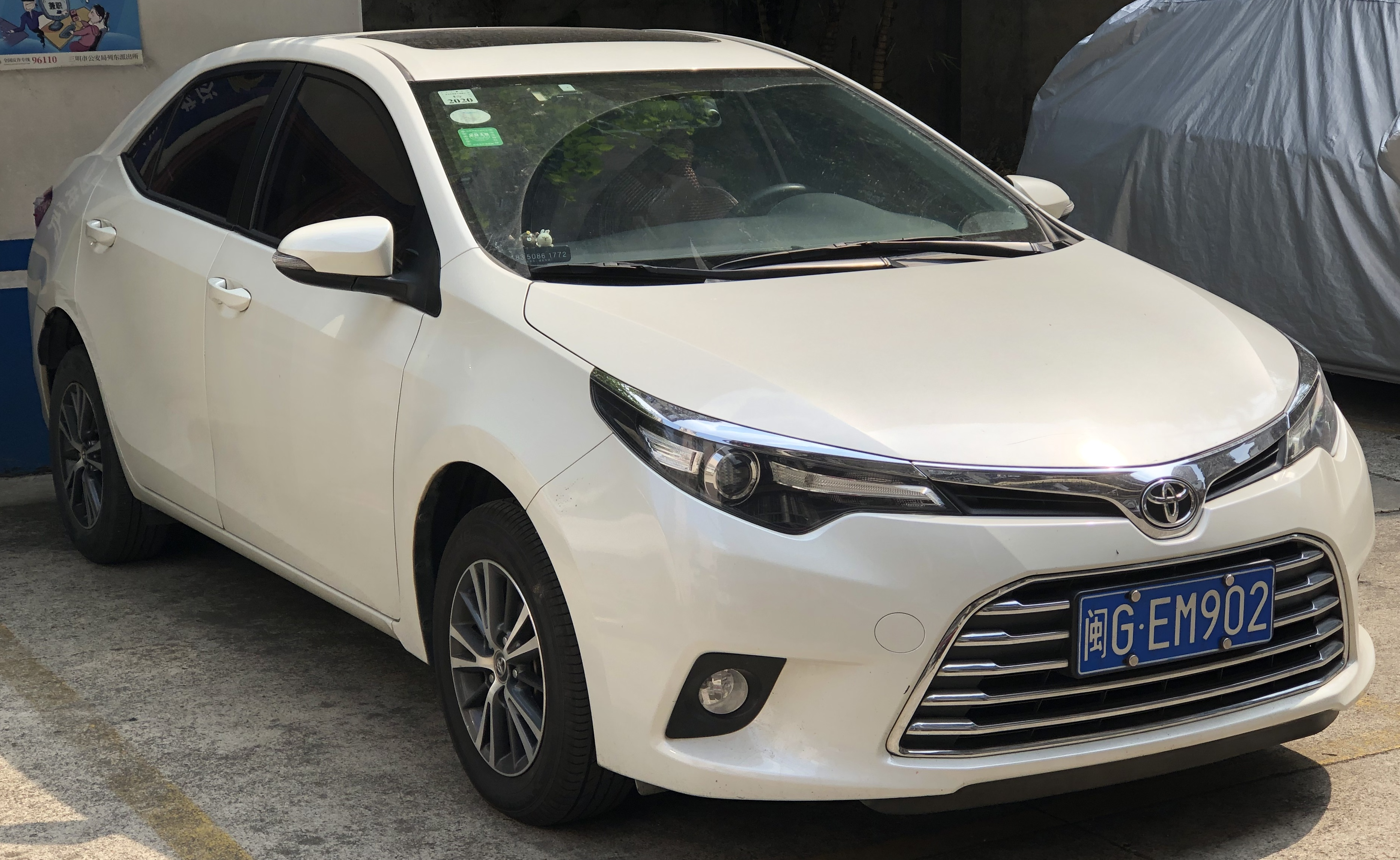
2014–2017
广汽丰田雷凌
GAC Toyota Levin

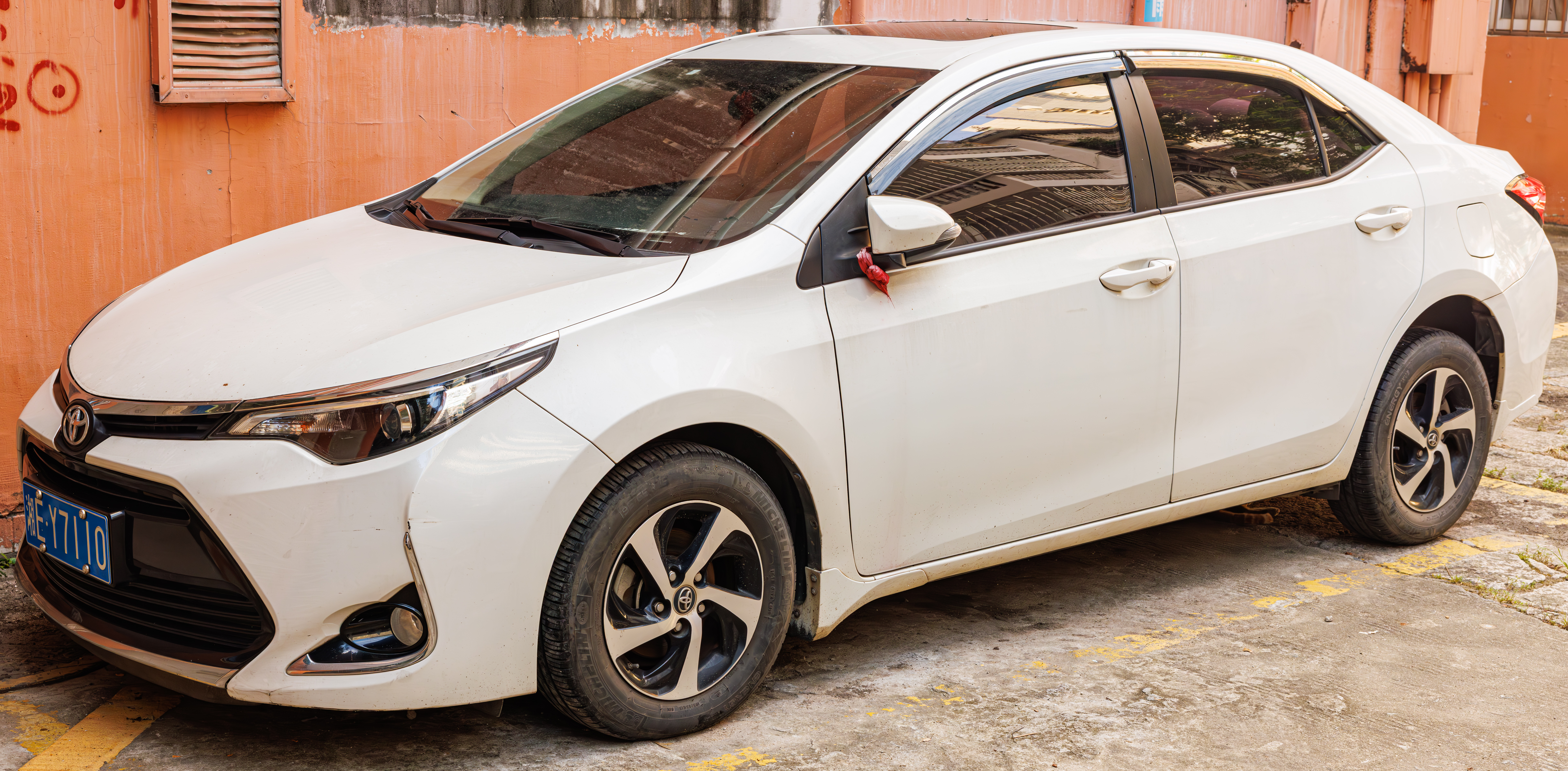
2017–2019
广汽丰田雷凌
GAC Toyota Levin

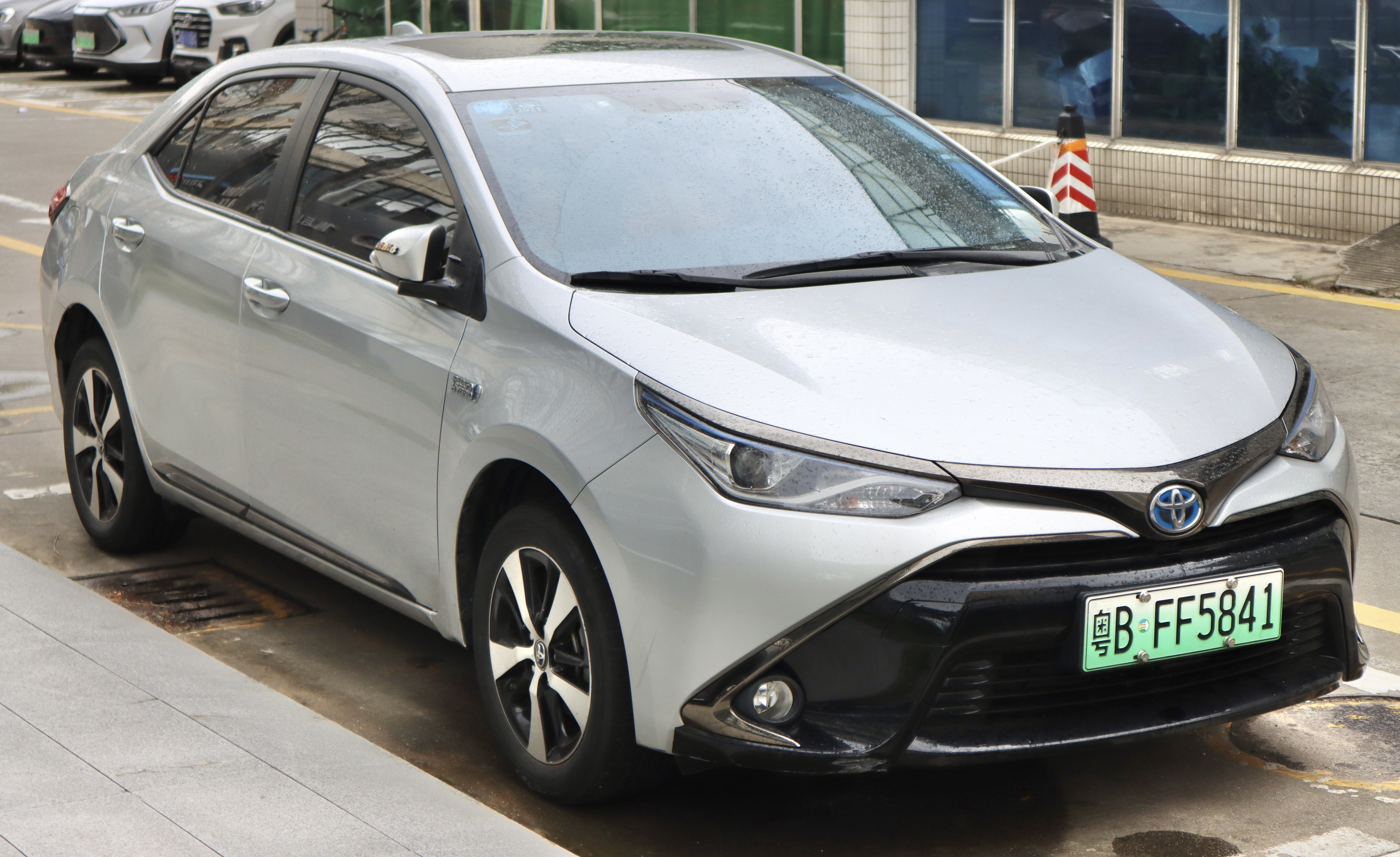
2018–2024
广汽丰田雷凌双擎E+
GAC Toyota Levin Plug-in Hybrid

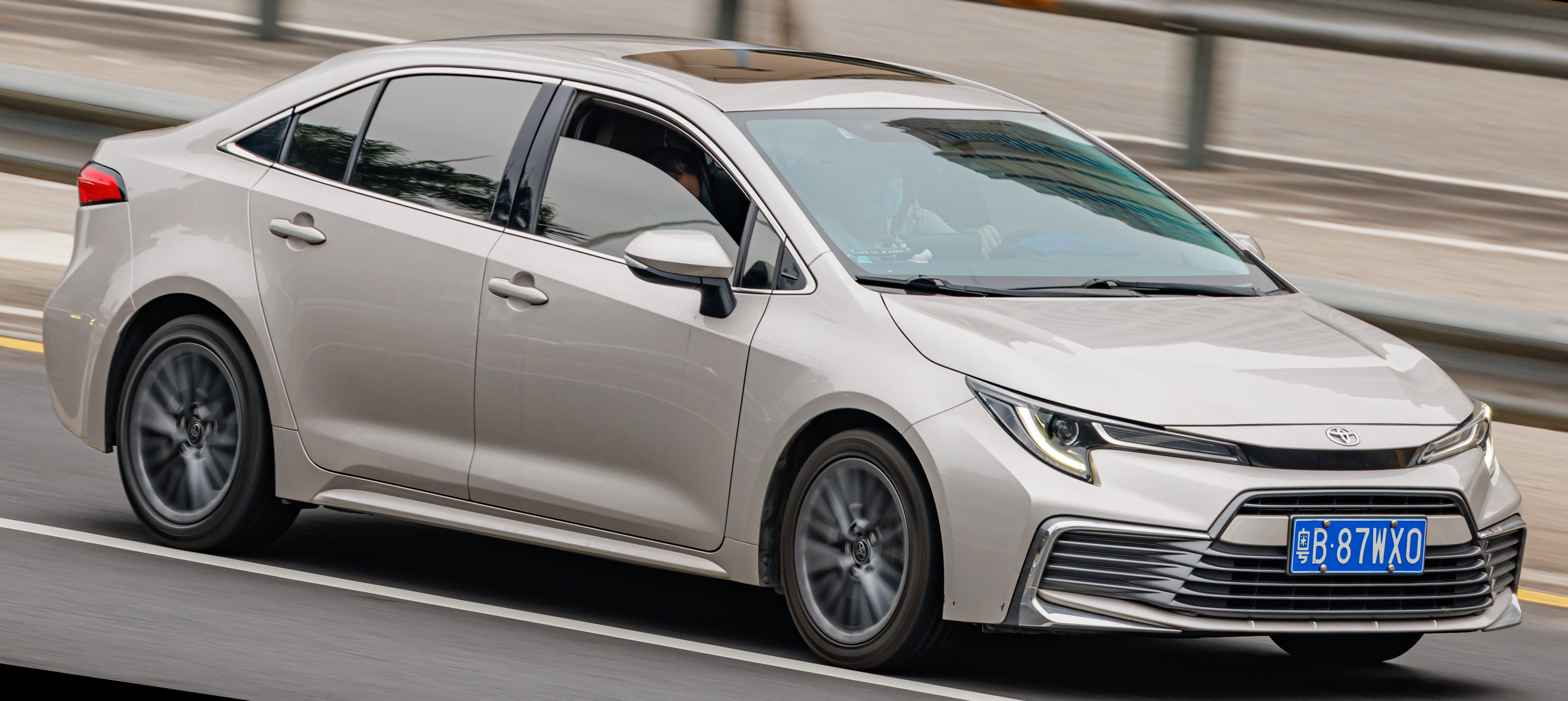
2021–2025
广汽丰田凌尚
GAC Toyota Levin GT

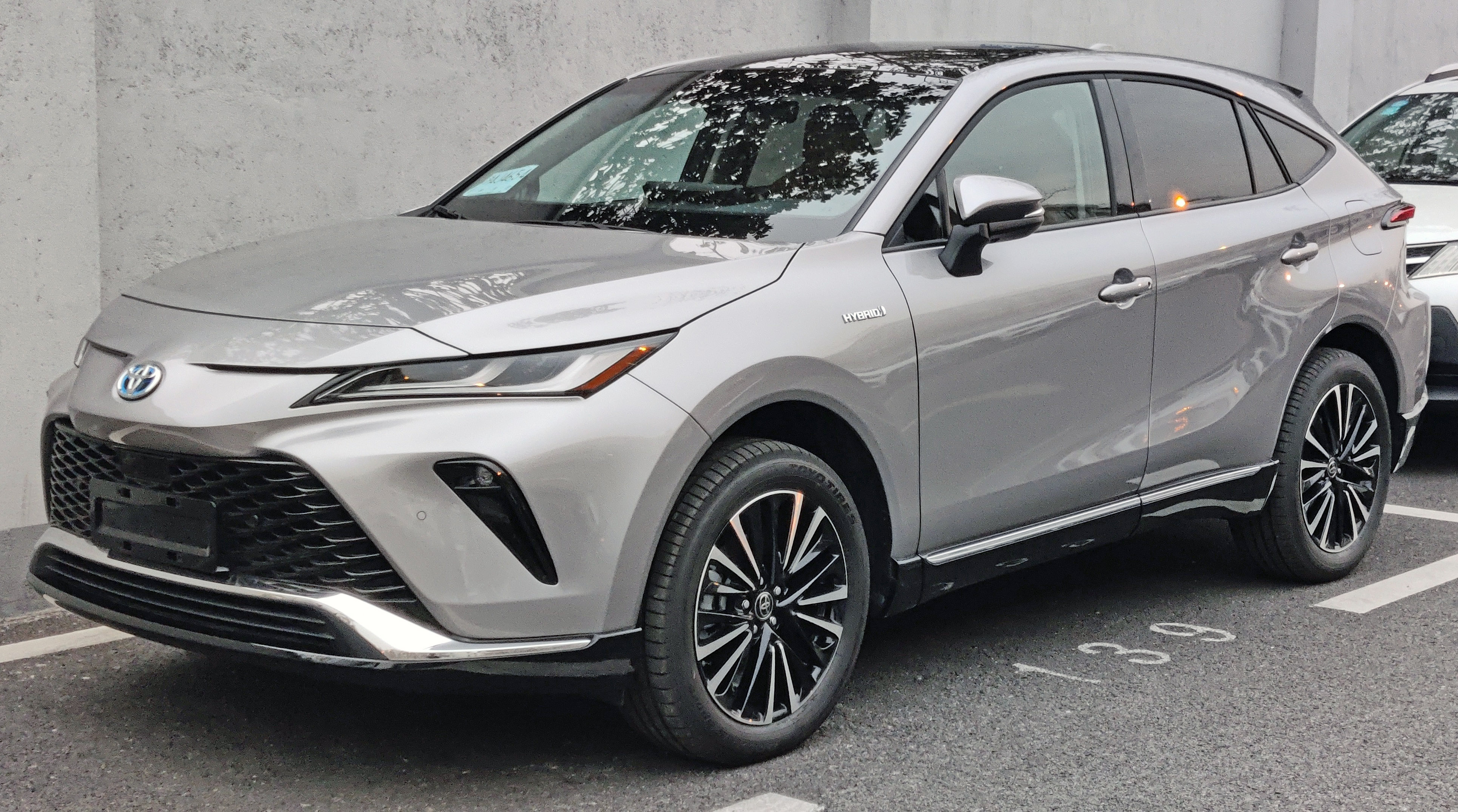
2021–2026
广汽丰田威飒
GAC Toyota Venza

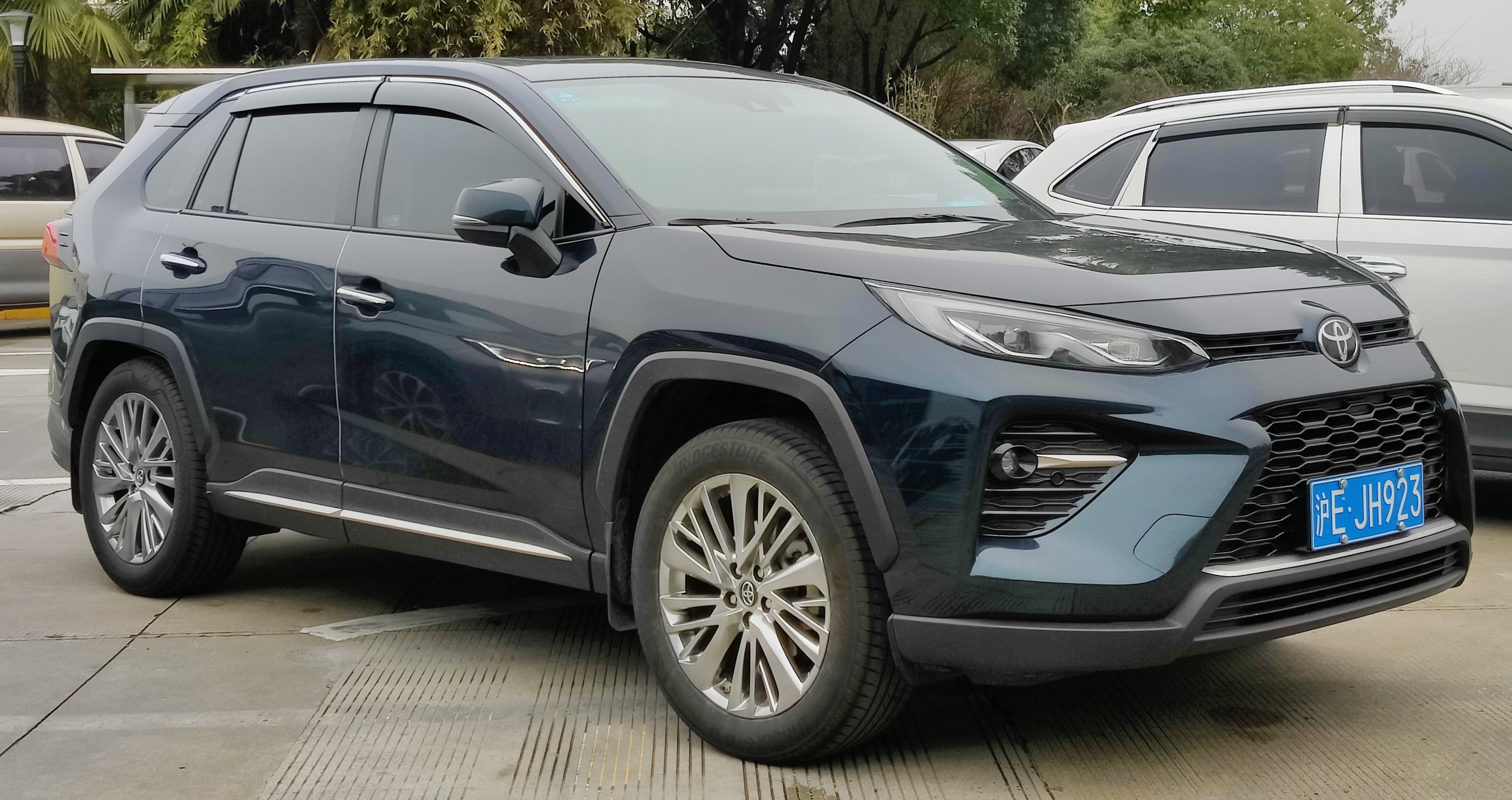
2019–2025
广汽丰田威兰达
GAC Toyota Wildlander

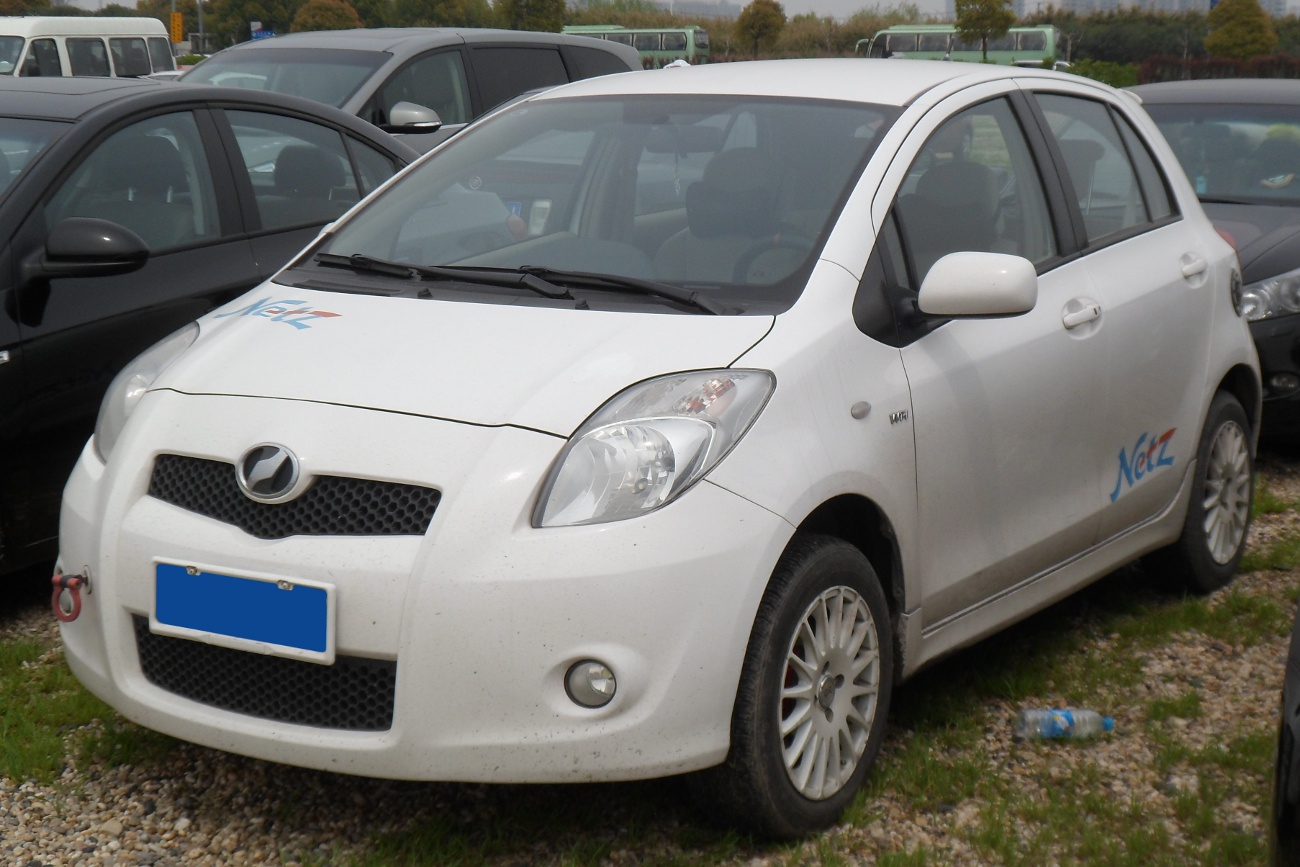
2008–2010
广汽丰田雅力士
GAC Toyota Yaris

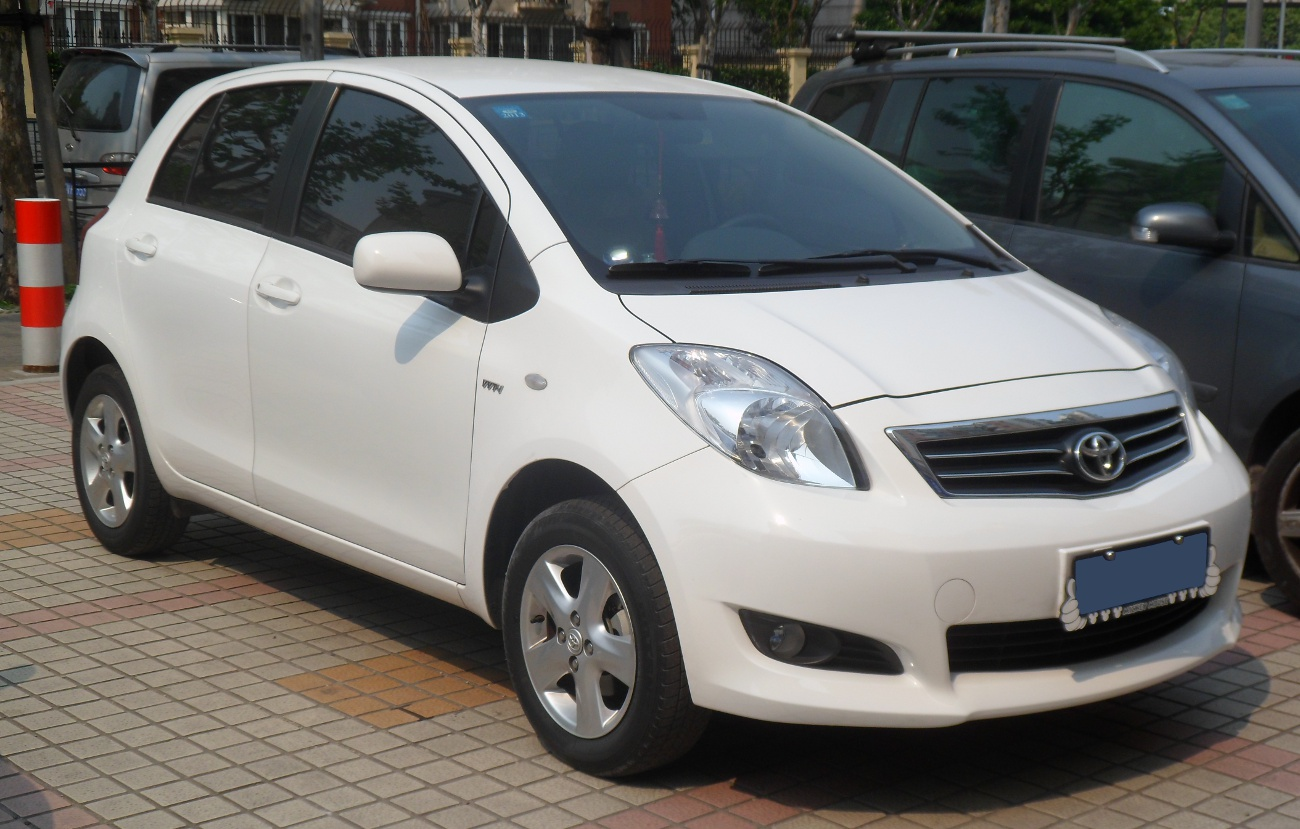
2010–2013
广汽丰田雅力士
GAC Toyota Yaris

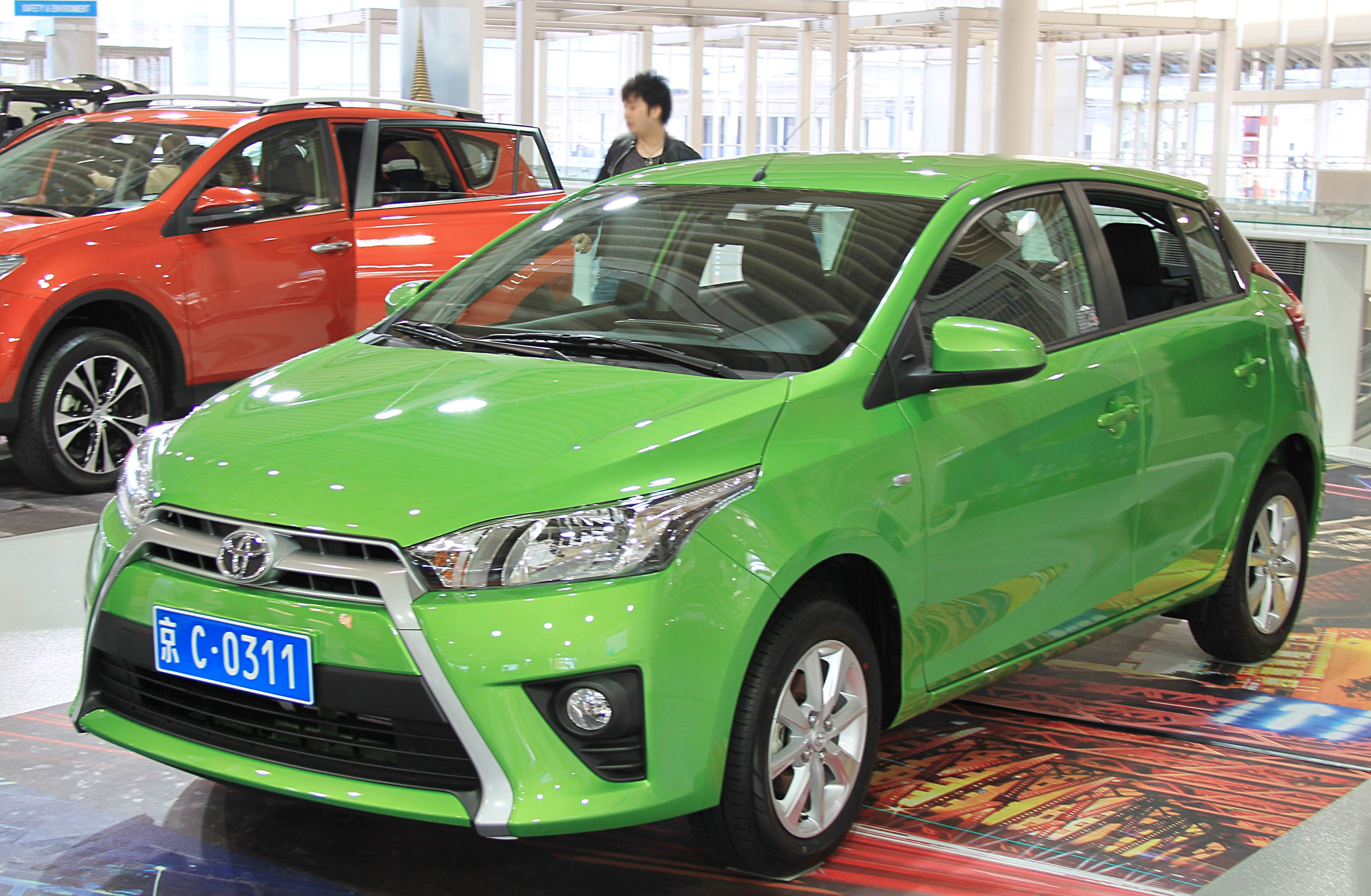
2013–2016
广汽丰田致炫
GAC Toyota Yaris L

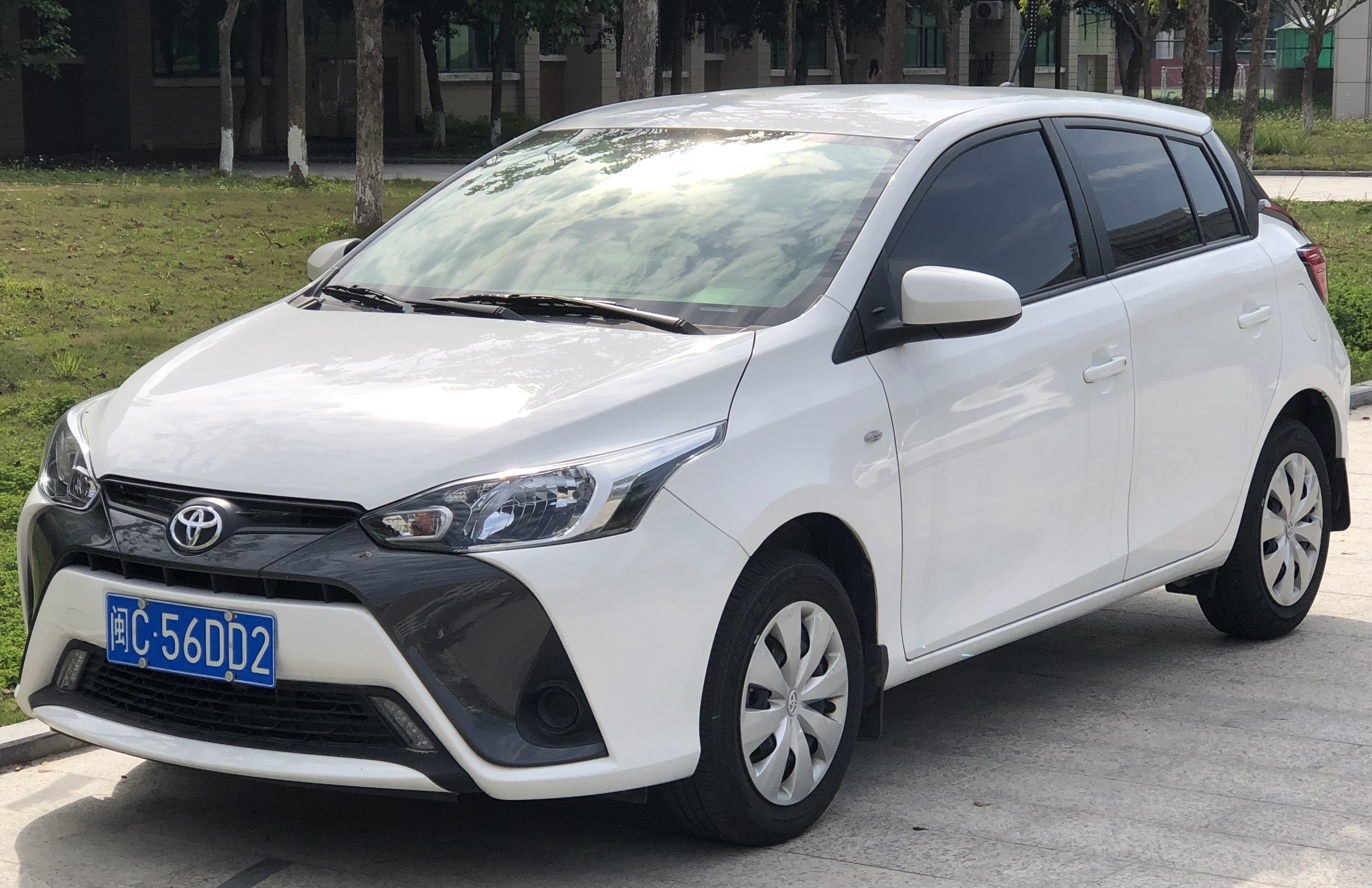
2016–2023
广汽丰田致炫
GAC Toyota Yaris L

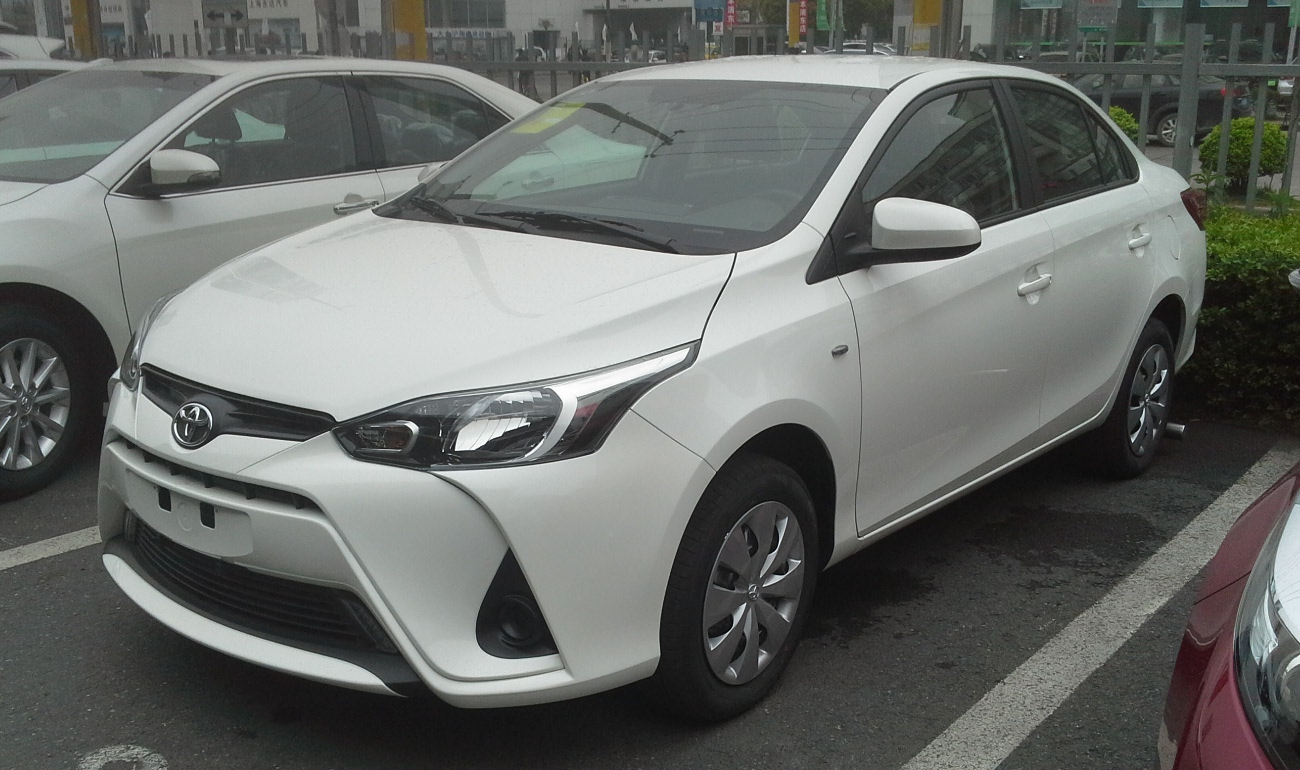
2016–2023
广汽丰田致享
GAC Toyota Yaris L Sedan

=== Former imported models ===
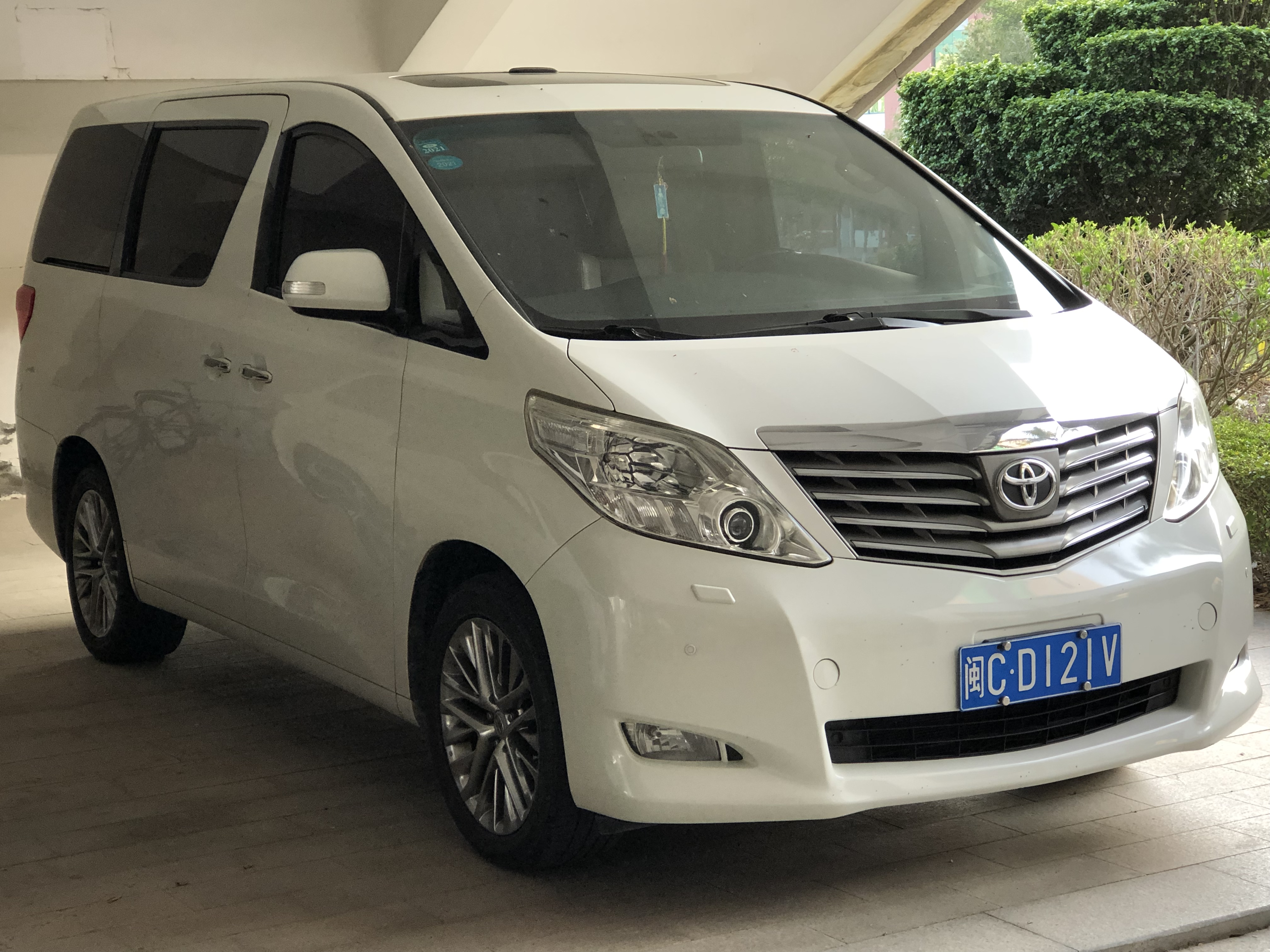
2010–2012
丰田埃尔法AH20
Toyota Alphard AH20

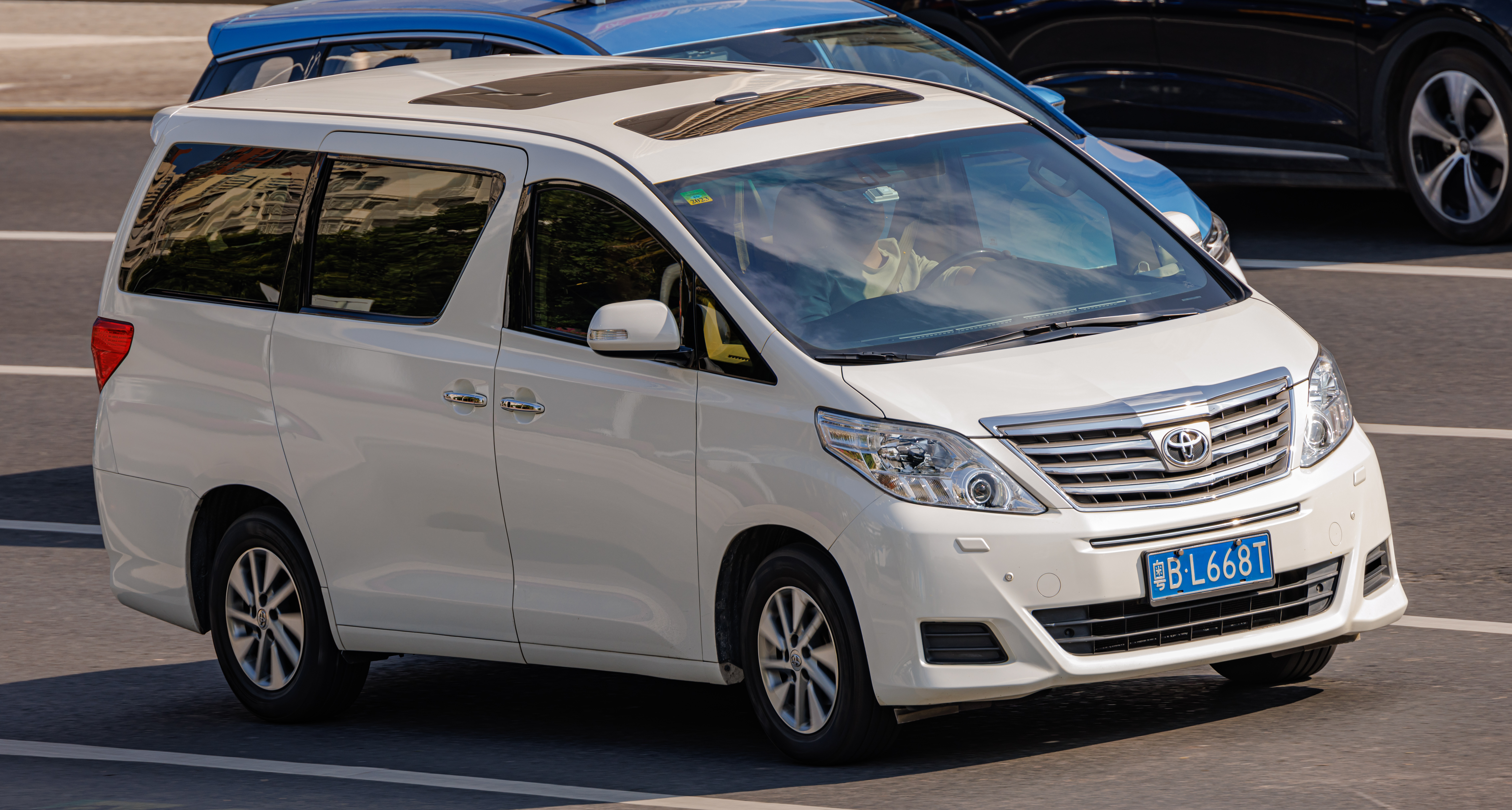
2012–2015
丰田埃尔法AH20
Toyota Alphard AH20

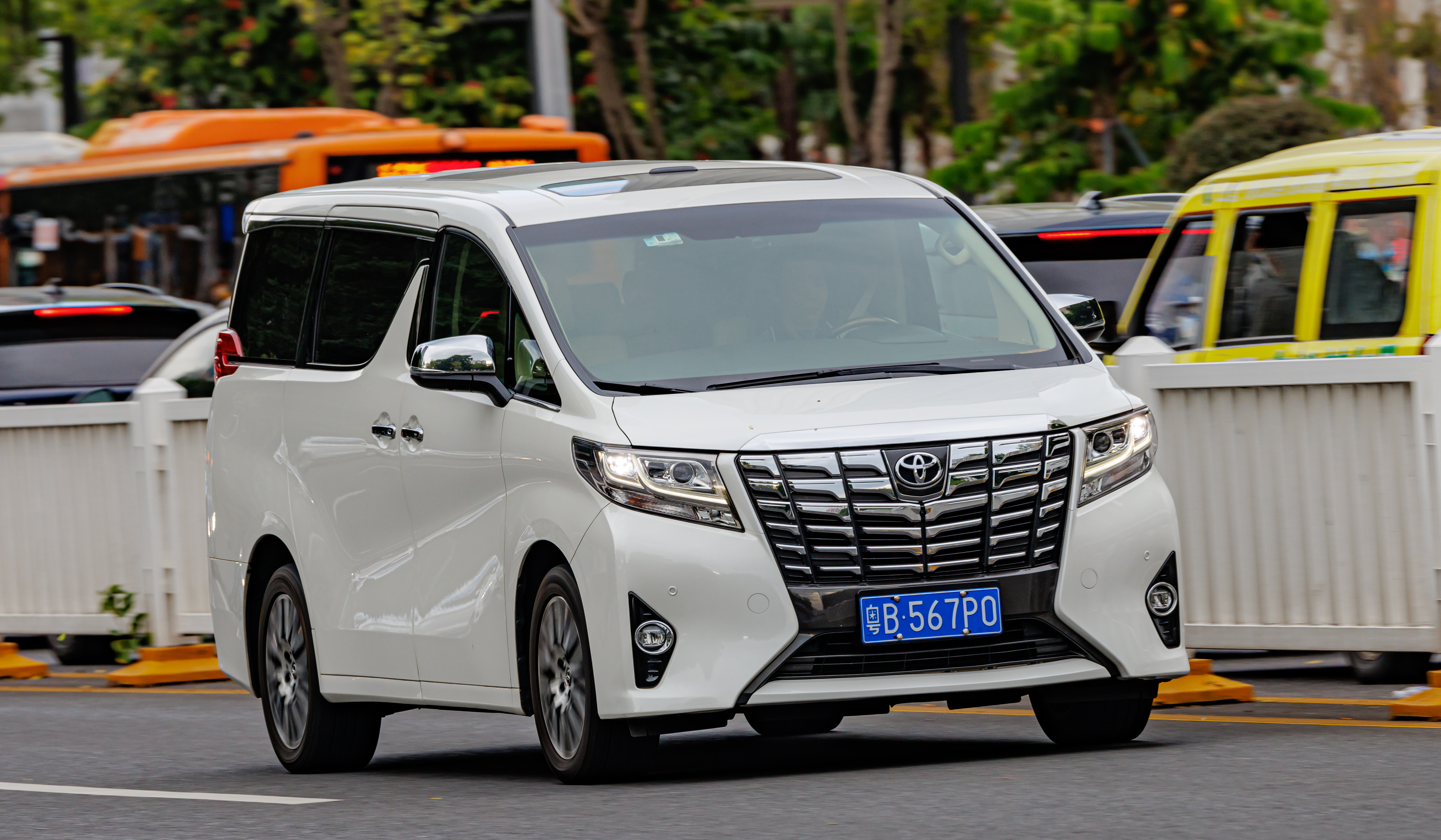
2015–2018
丰田埃尔法AH30
Toyota Alphard AH30

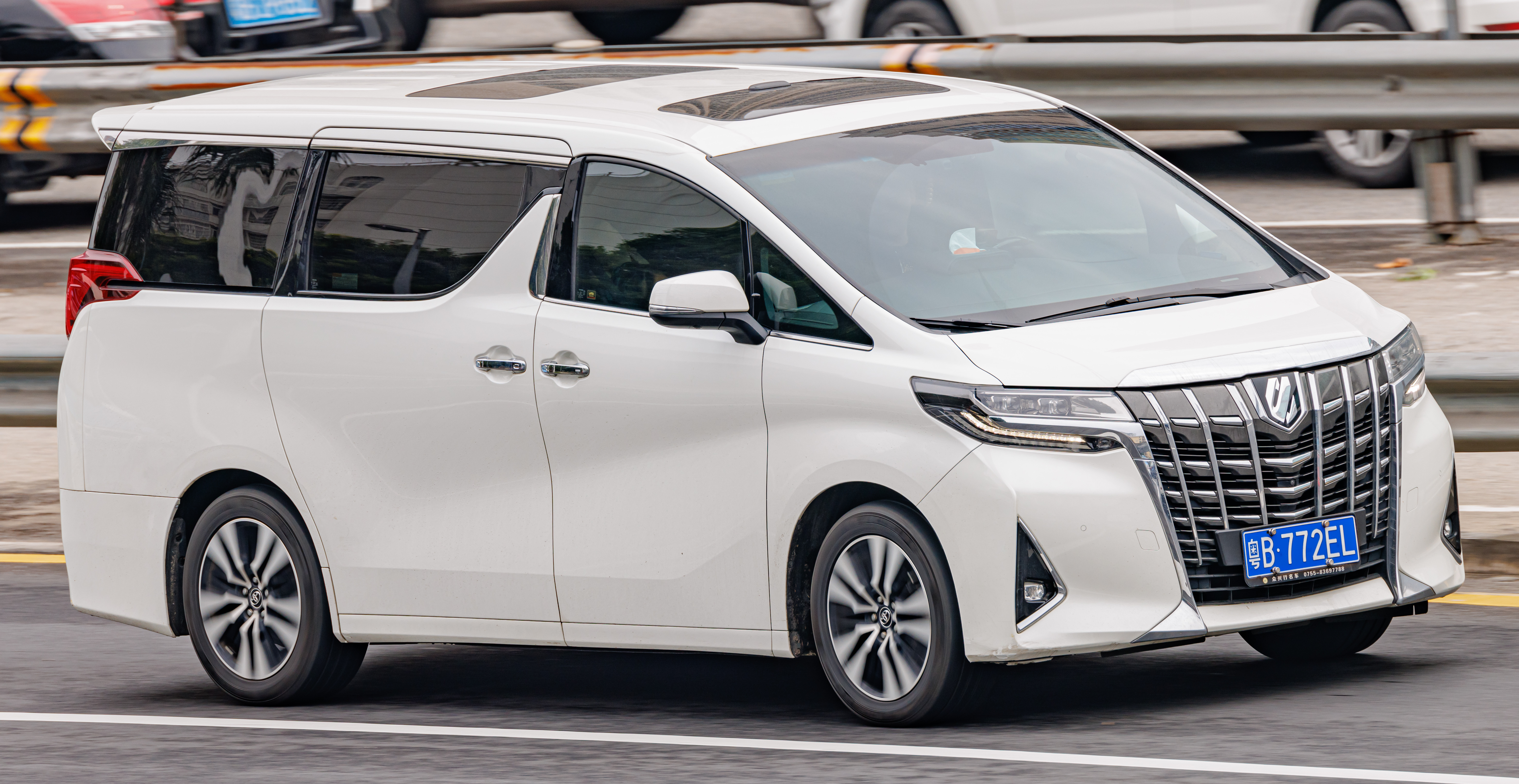
2018–2019
丰田埃尔法AH30
Toyota Alphard AH30

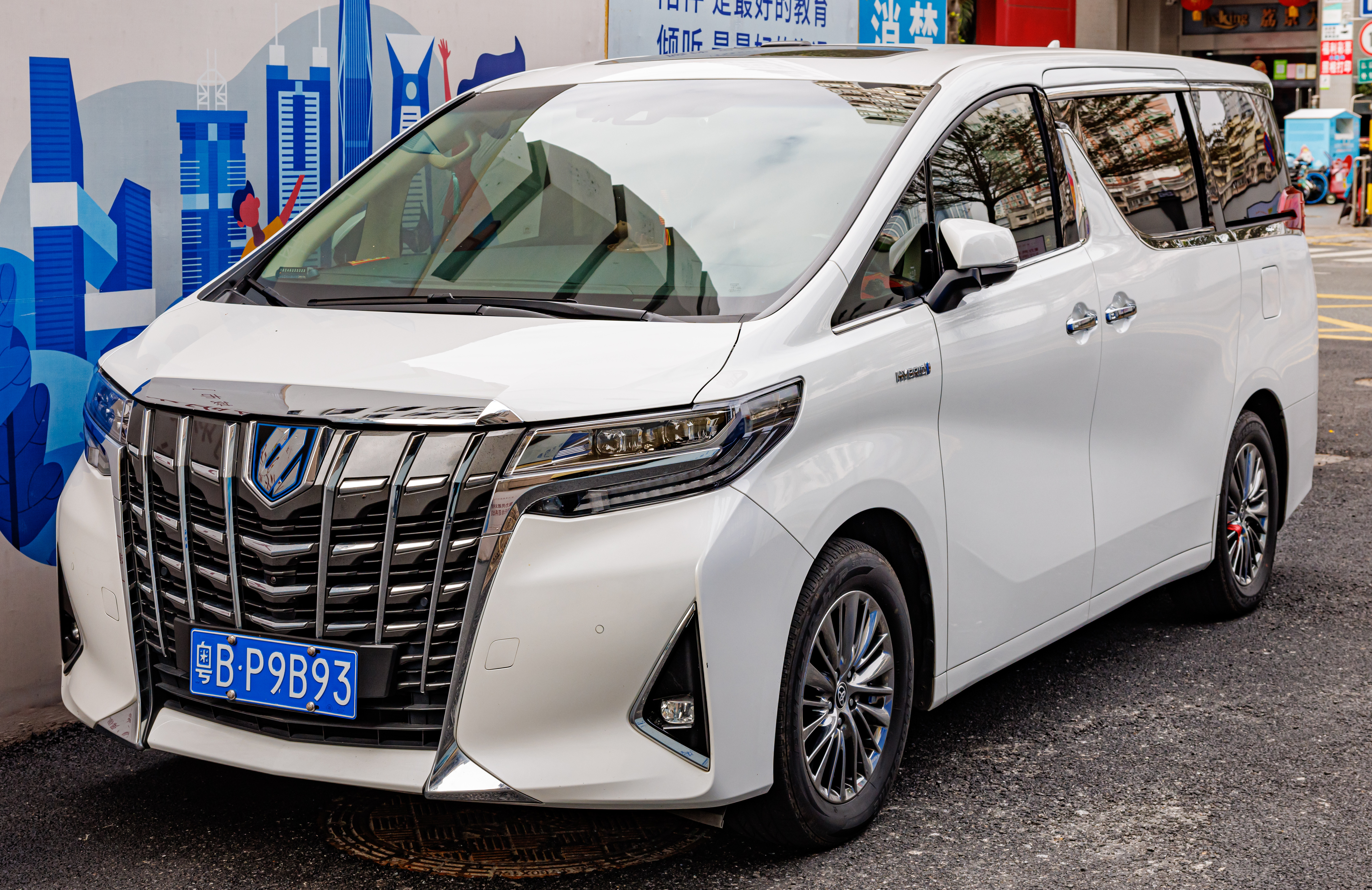
2019–2023
丰田埃尔法双擎AH30
Toyota Alphard Hybrid AH30

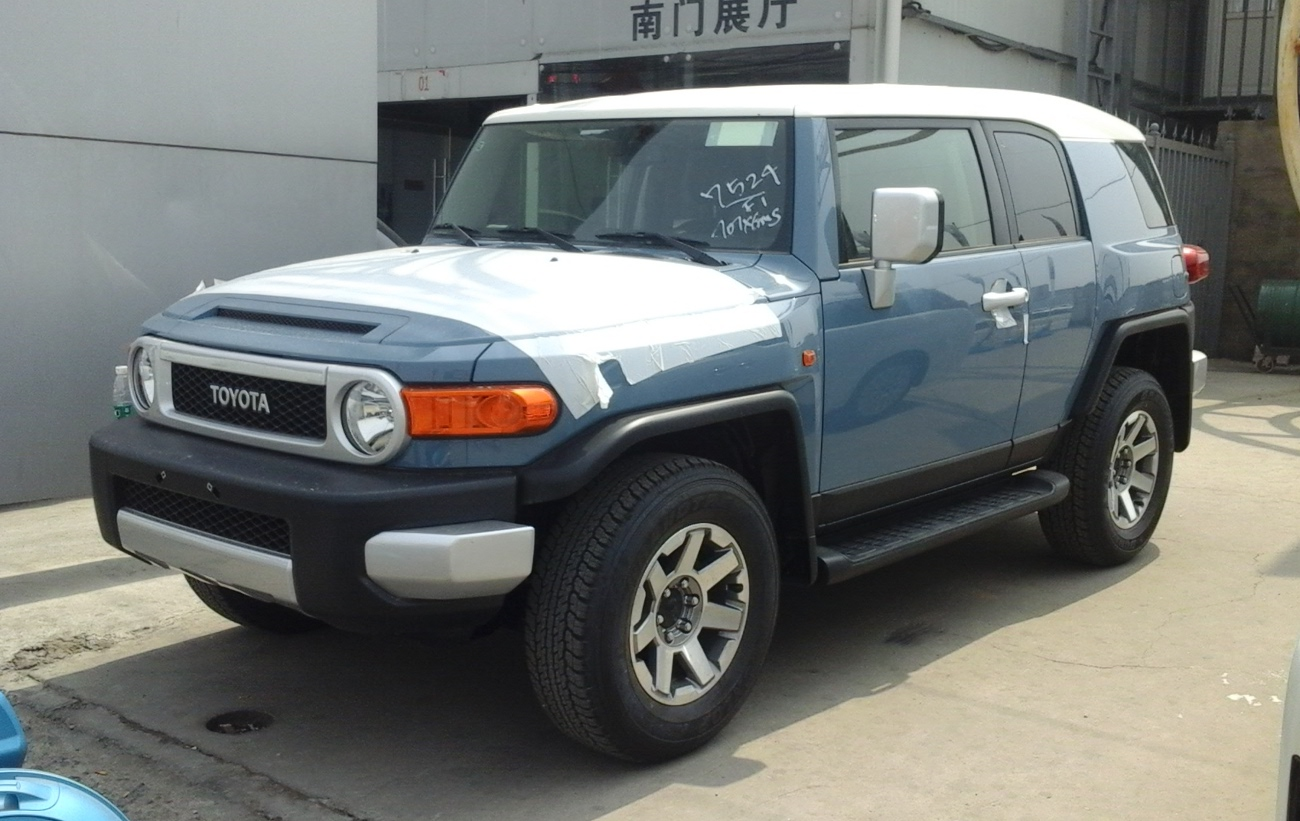
2007–2013
丰田FJ酷路泽
Toyota FJ Cruiser

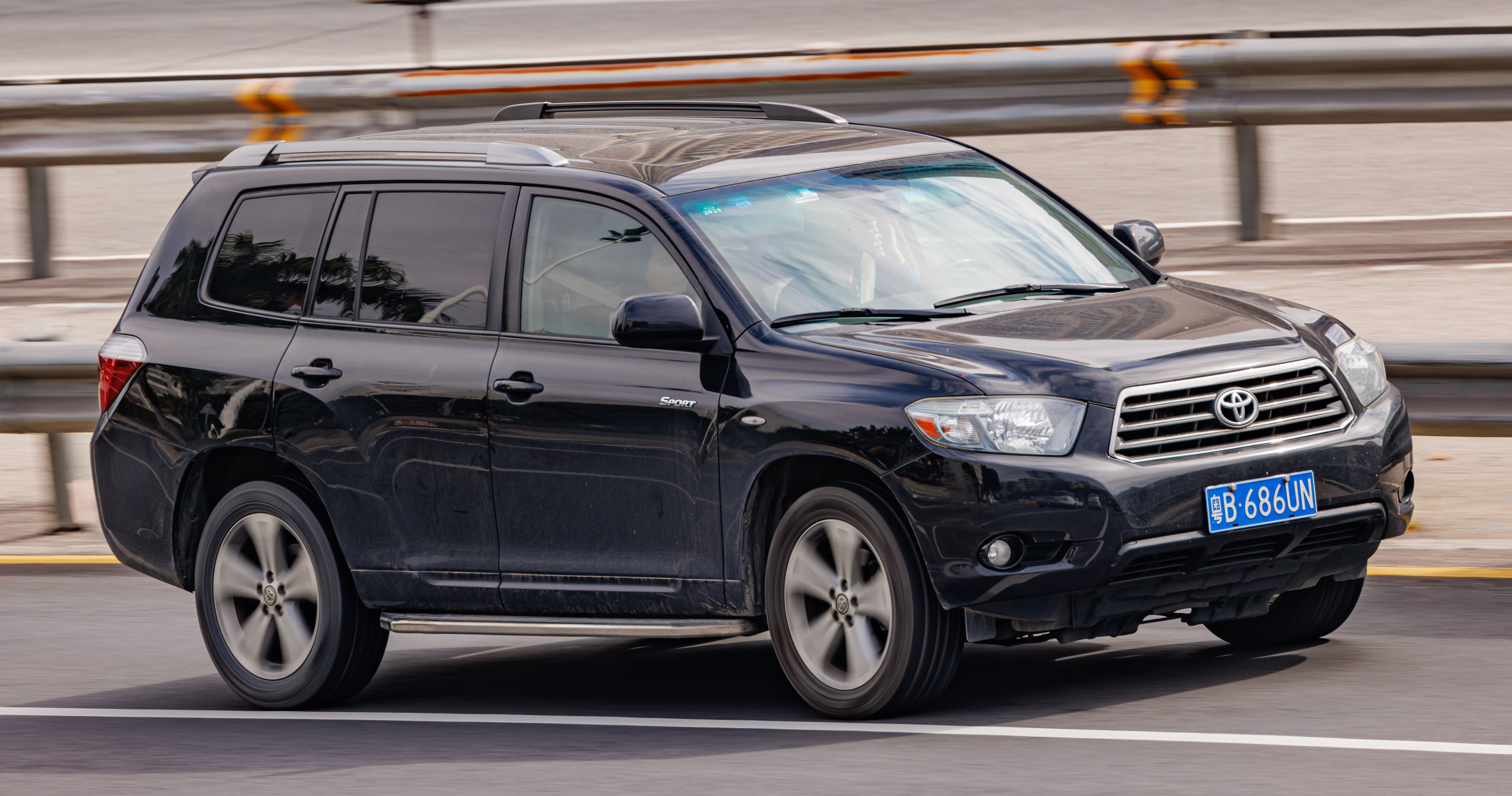
2007–2009
丰田汉兰达XU40
Toyota Highlander XU40

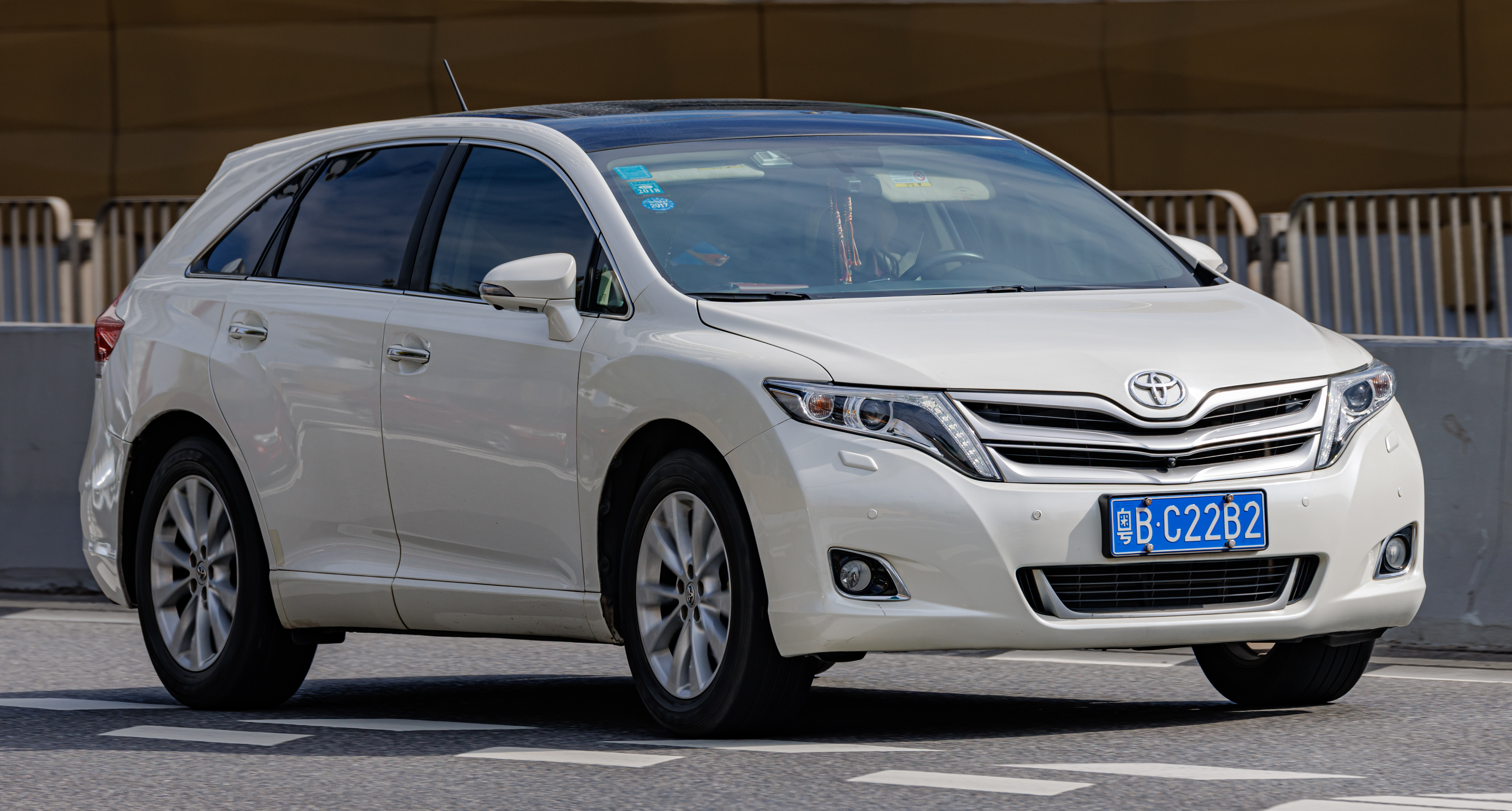
2013
丰田威飒
Toyota Venza

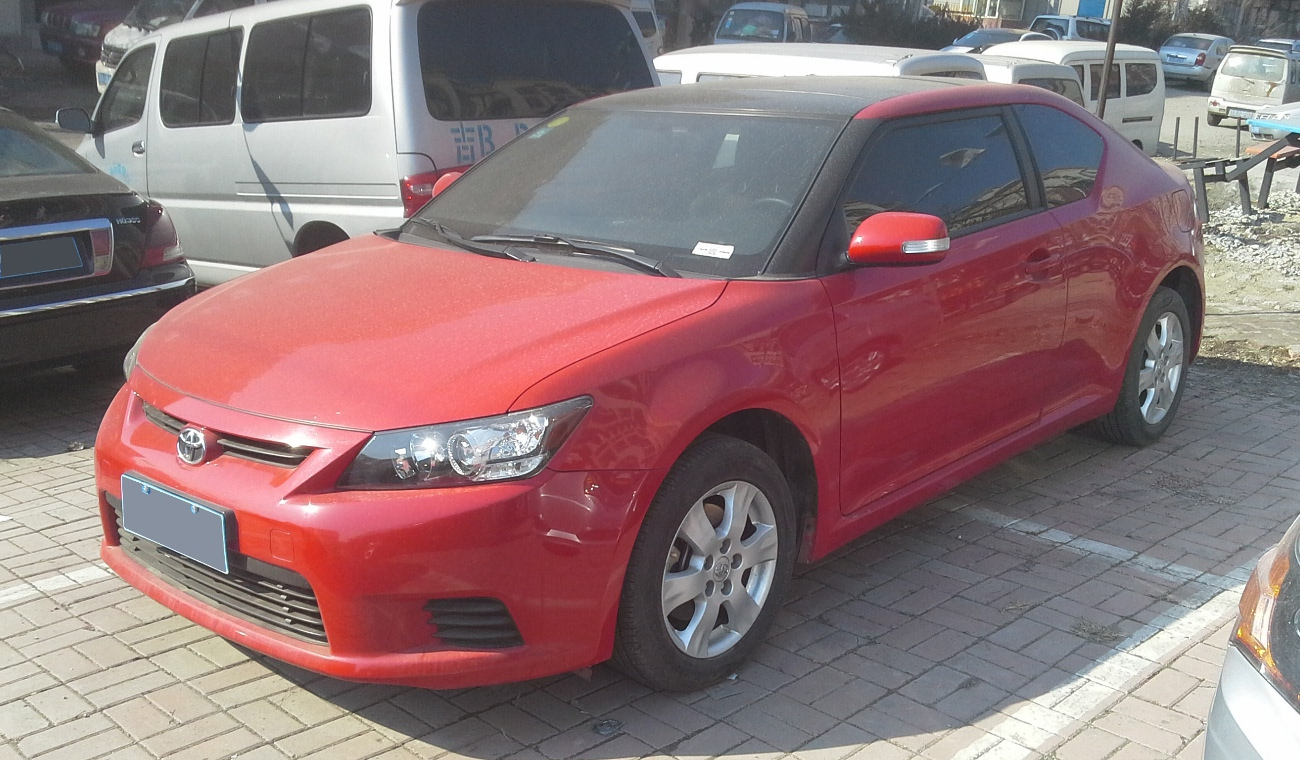
2011–2014
丰田杰路驰
Toyota Zelas

== Leahead ==
Leahead (Chinese: 领志; pinyin: Lǐngzhì) is an electric car marque owned by GAC Toyota. It was announced in October 2014. A concept of the first production car for the marque, the Leahead i1, was unveiled at the 2015 Shanghai Motor Show and the production-ready version was unveiled at the Guangzhou Auto Show later that year. The i1 is based on the Yaris and has an autonomy range of about 128 kilometres (80 mi). It has a 22 kWh battery and the motor delivers up to 70 kilowatts (95 hp). Leahead is a portmanteau of Leap Ahead.

=== Recalls ===
In 2018, Leahead i1s were recalled for replacing their defective Takata airbags.

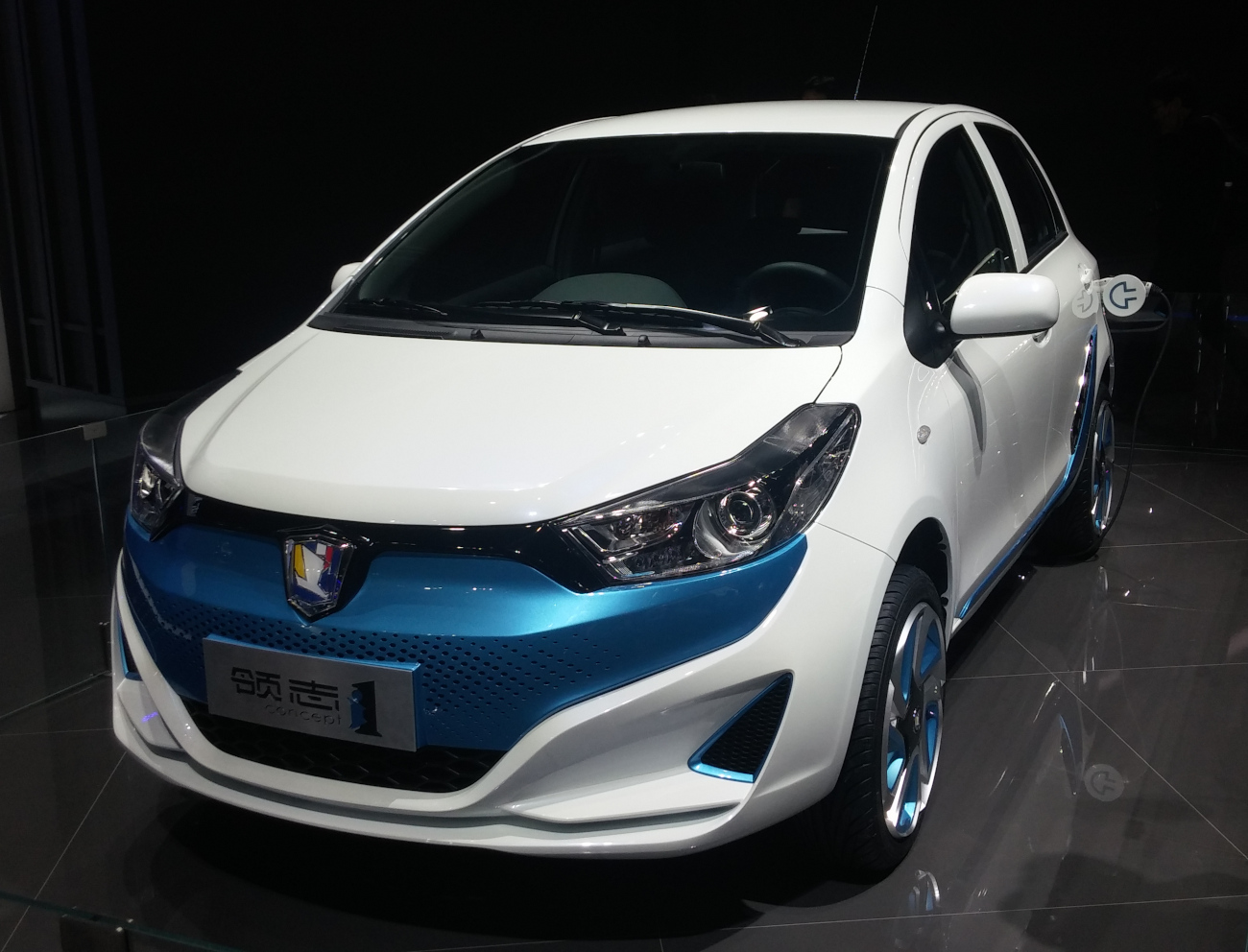
Leahead i1

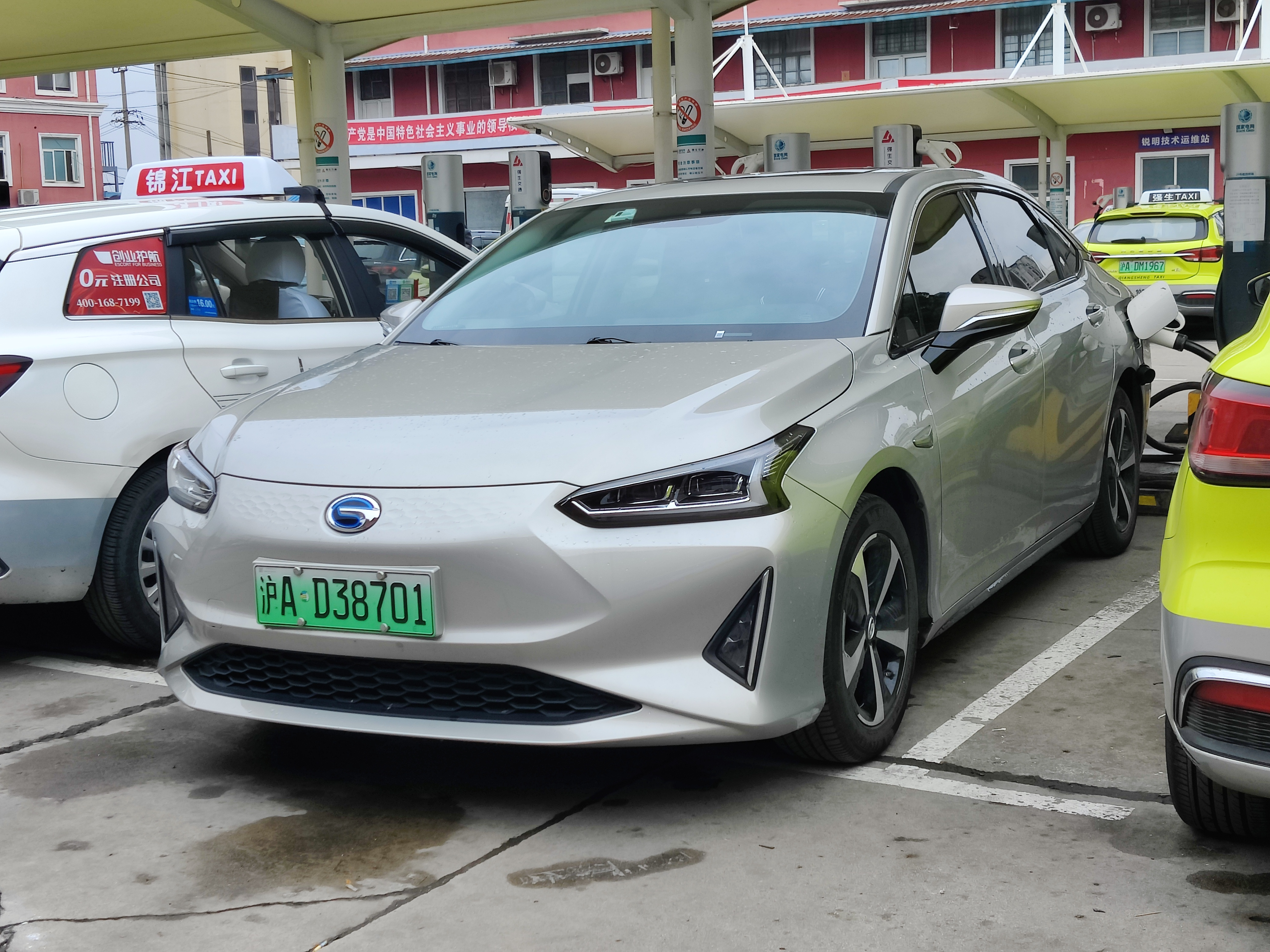
Leahead iA5

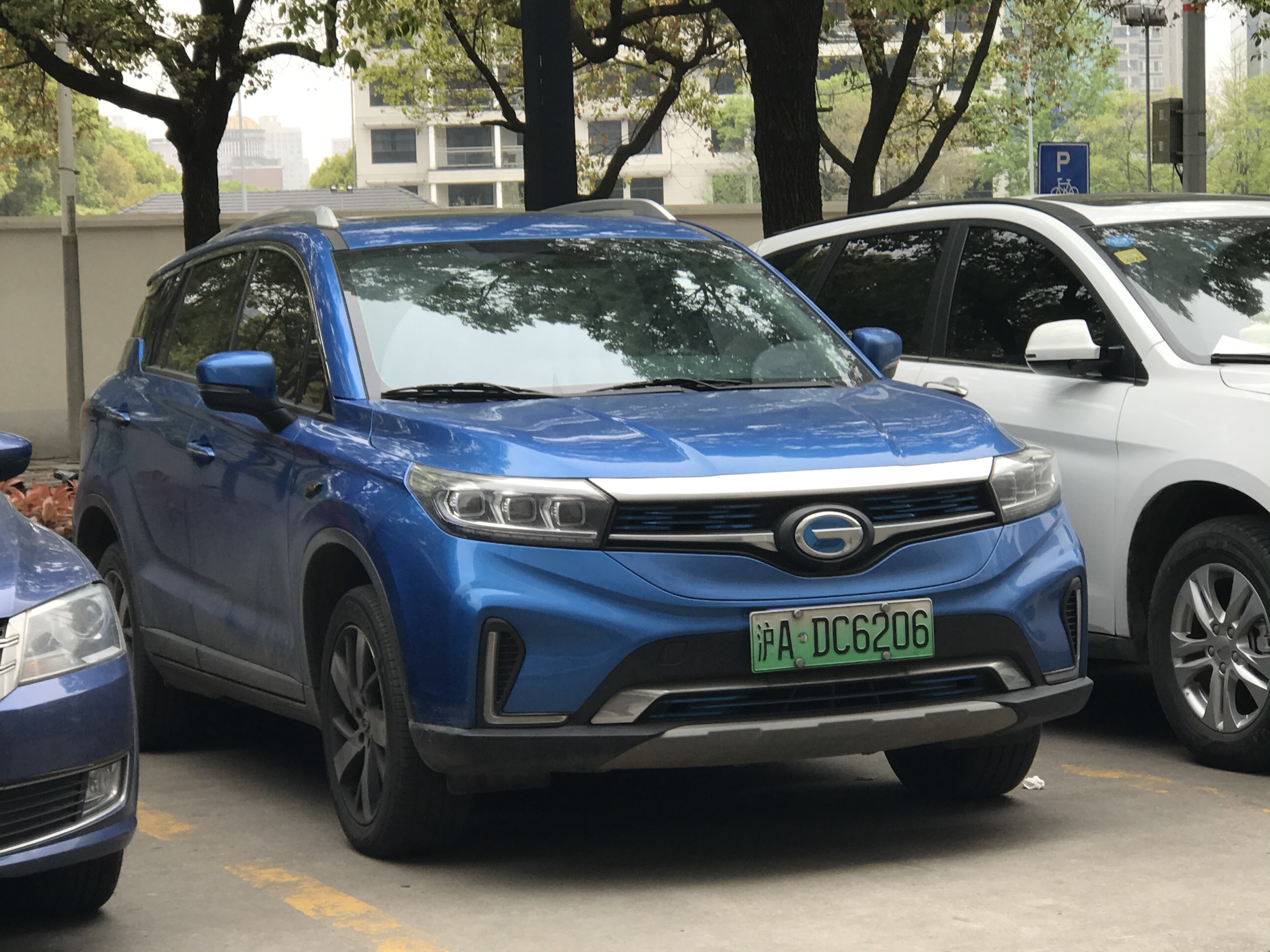
Leahead ix4

== See also ==
- GAC Group
- Toyota Motor China
- FAW Toyota
