= Lexus LF =

Concept car series by Lexus

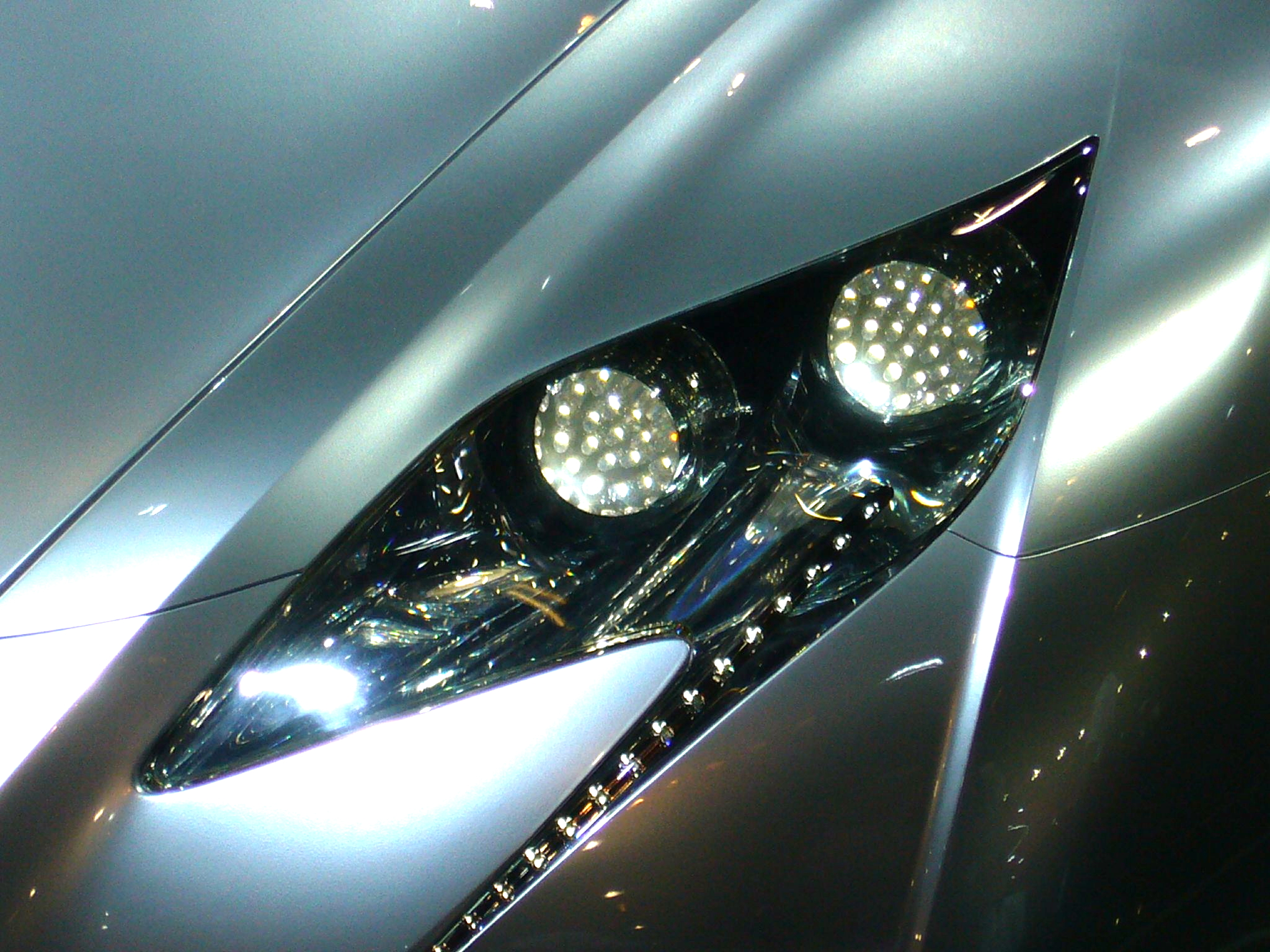
Lexus LF concept series headlight.

The Lexus LF line is a series of concept cars built by Lexus, the luxury vehicle division of Toyota Motor Corporation. The "LF" designation refers to Lexus Future. The LF Series vehicles features coupes/convertibles, including: the LF-A, the LF-A Roadster, LF-LC, LF-CC, and the LF-C; sedans: the LF-S, LF-Sh, and LF-Gh; crossover SUVs: the LF-X and LF-Xh; and hatchbacks: the LF-Ch. The first concept vehicle of the LF Series, the LF-X, appeared in 2003. The LF Series utilizes L-finesse, a design philosophy named for "Leading Edge" and "finesse", which debuted on the LF Series concepts and later extended to all new production Lexus vehicles. New vehicle technologies on the LF Series include advanced instrumentation, multiple driver-selected vehicle configurations, hybrid and experimental powertrains, and unconventional driver interface designs. The vehicles also feature new design cues which derive from the L-finesse design language of "Intriguing Elegance" (純), "Incisive Simplicity" (妙), and "Seamless Anticipation" (予). Several of the LF concept vehicles have appeared close to their production counterparts, while the design cues of other LF concepts appeared on more distinctly different production vehicles.

== LF-A ==
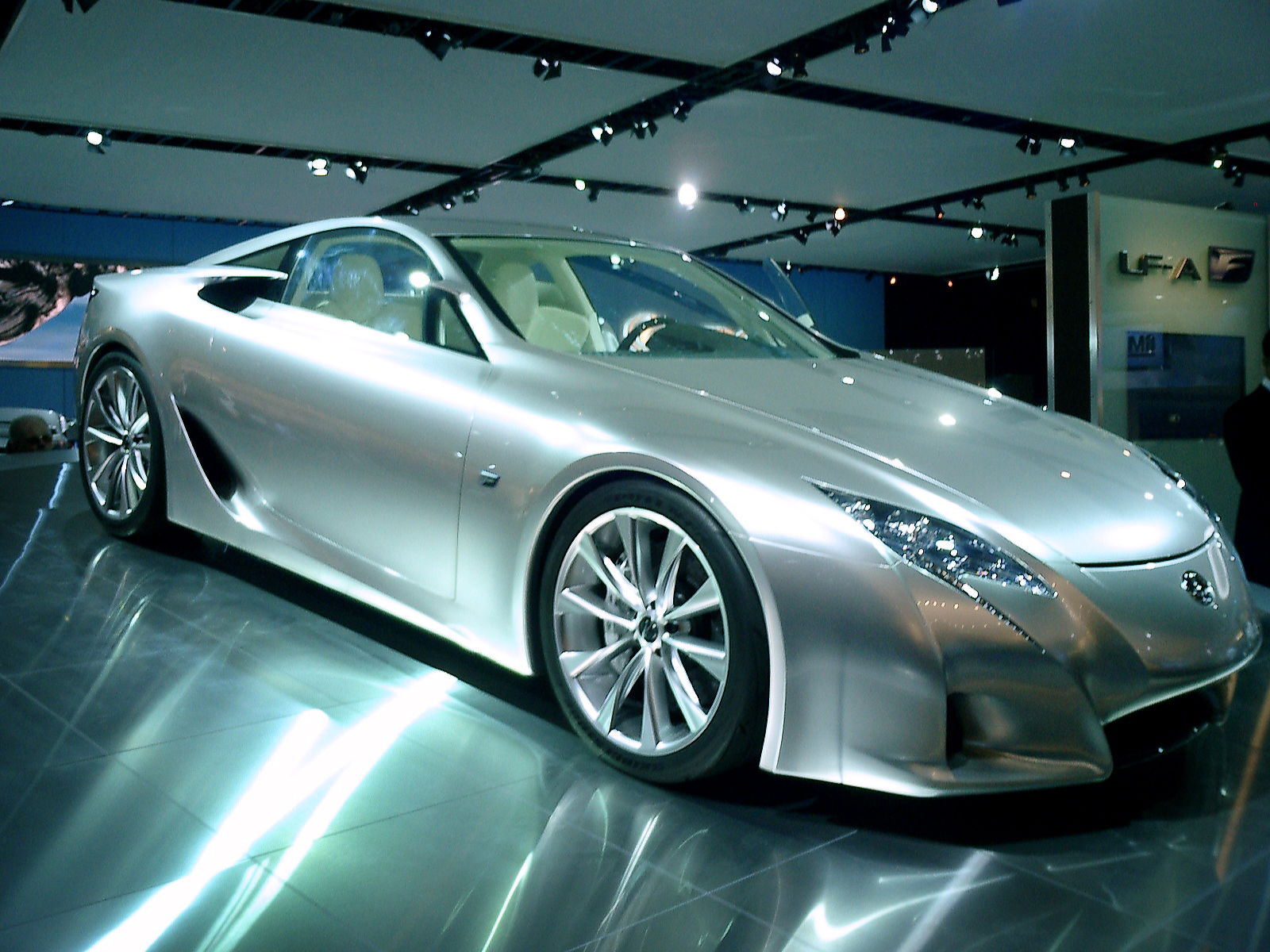
Lexus LF-A concept at the 2007 North American International Auto Show.

The LF-A is a 2-door exotic concept car built as a prospective halo car for the Lexus division. Three versions have been shown, the first of which debuted at the 2005 North American International Auto Show (NAIAS). The designation stands for Lexus Future-Advance. The first concept was about five inches shorter than the Porsche 911 Turbo (996) with a wheelbase about nine inches longer, and was nearly 48 inches (1,200 mm) in height about equal to the Ferrari F430 with a width of 73.2 in (1,859 mm). It was powered by a V10 engine displacing 4.8 liters, generating over 550 hp (410 kW) and had a top speed around 208 mph (335 km/h). To maintain a near ideal weight distribution a rear transaxle is used and the radiators are mounted at the rear. A second revised version with a more completely furnished interior and exterior was unveiled two years later at the 2007 NAIAS as a possible future member of the Lexus F marque performance lineup. The interior gauges revealed a 9,000 RPM redline, however news reports speculated that it might not make the production version. The third version of the LF-A concept, a roadster model, premiered in 2008.

Reports in 2006 indicated that the LF-A concept car had received the green-light for production. Prototypes of the LF-A had been spotted regularly undergoing testing at Nürburgring since October 2004, the famous motorsport race track in Nürburg, Germany. Numerous test vehicles have been equipped with automatic retractable rear wings, and carbon ceramic brake discs. The production vehicles were expected to carry V10 engines, putting the car in market competition with the Lamborghini Gallardo, Ferrari F430, the Porsche 911 (997), and the Chevrolet Corvette C6 ZR1. Pricing was estimated at over $225,000, and close to $400,000. In December 2007, Auto Express reported that the LF-A had set an unofficial 7:24 lap record at the Nürburgring. The production $375,000 Lexus LFA supercar debuted in 2009.

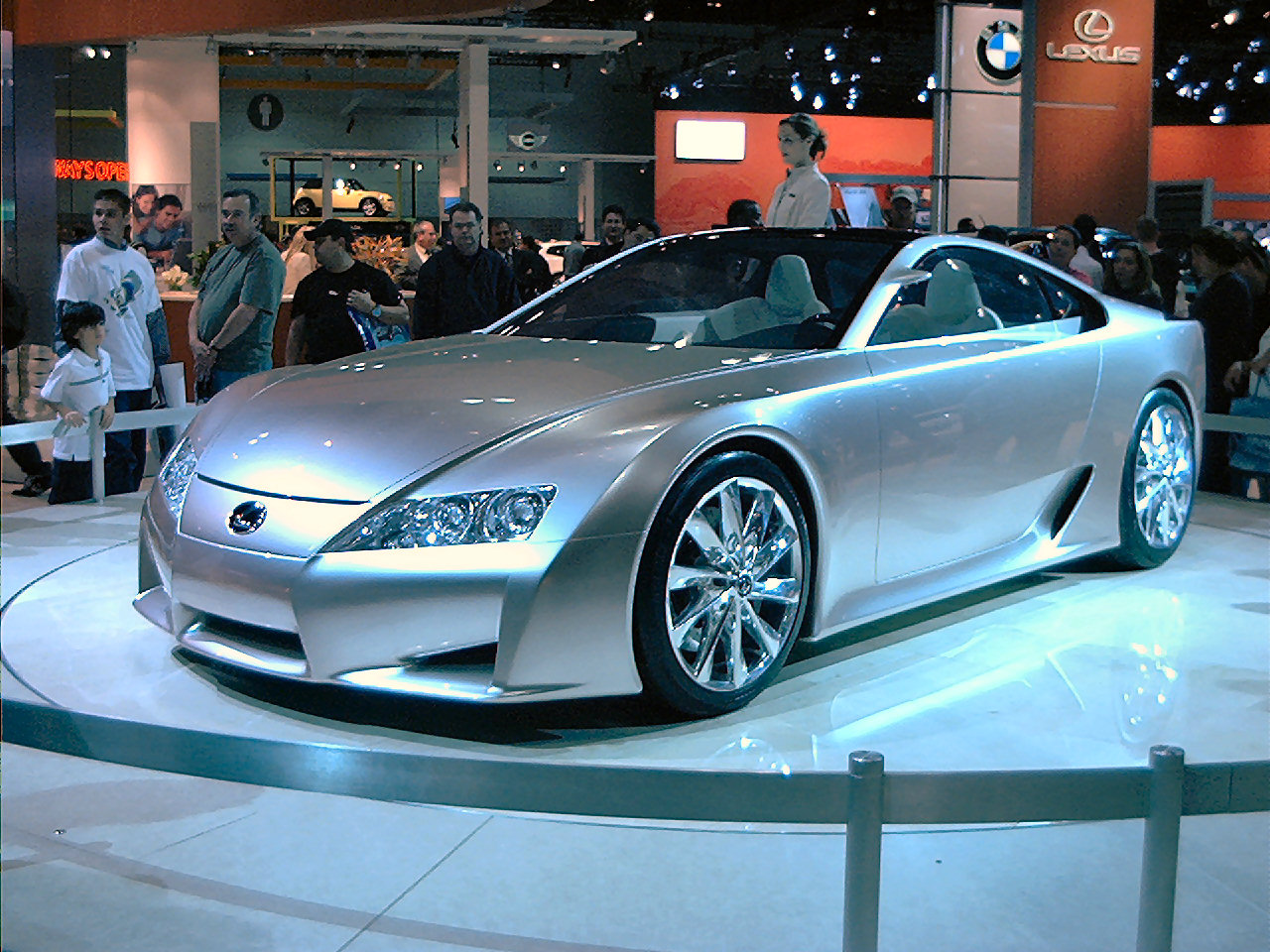
At the '06 LA Auto Show

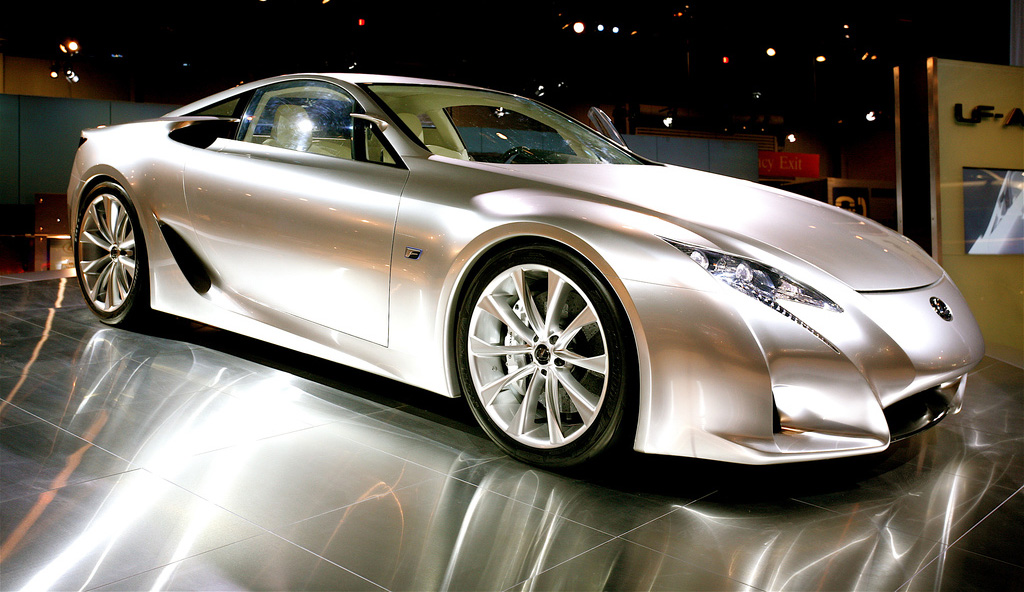
At the 2007 Chicago Auto Show

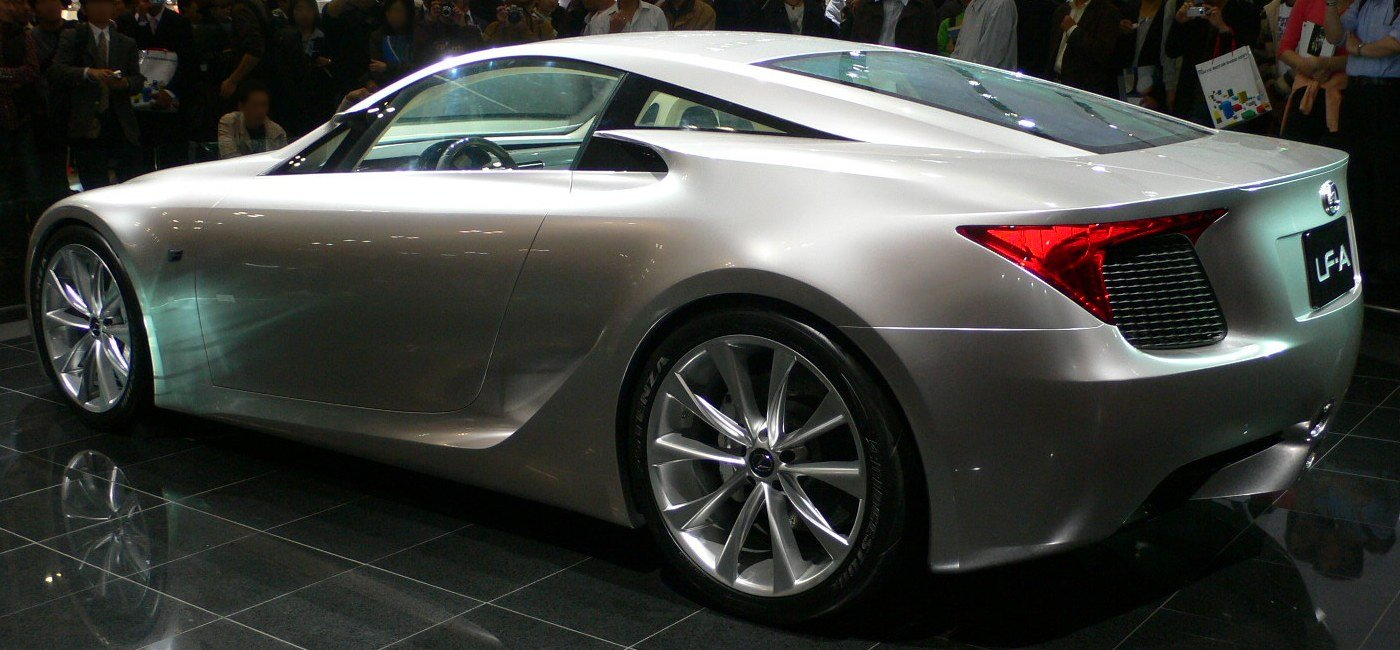
LF-A at 2007 TMS

== LF-AR ==
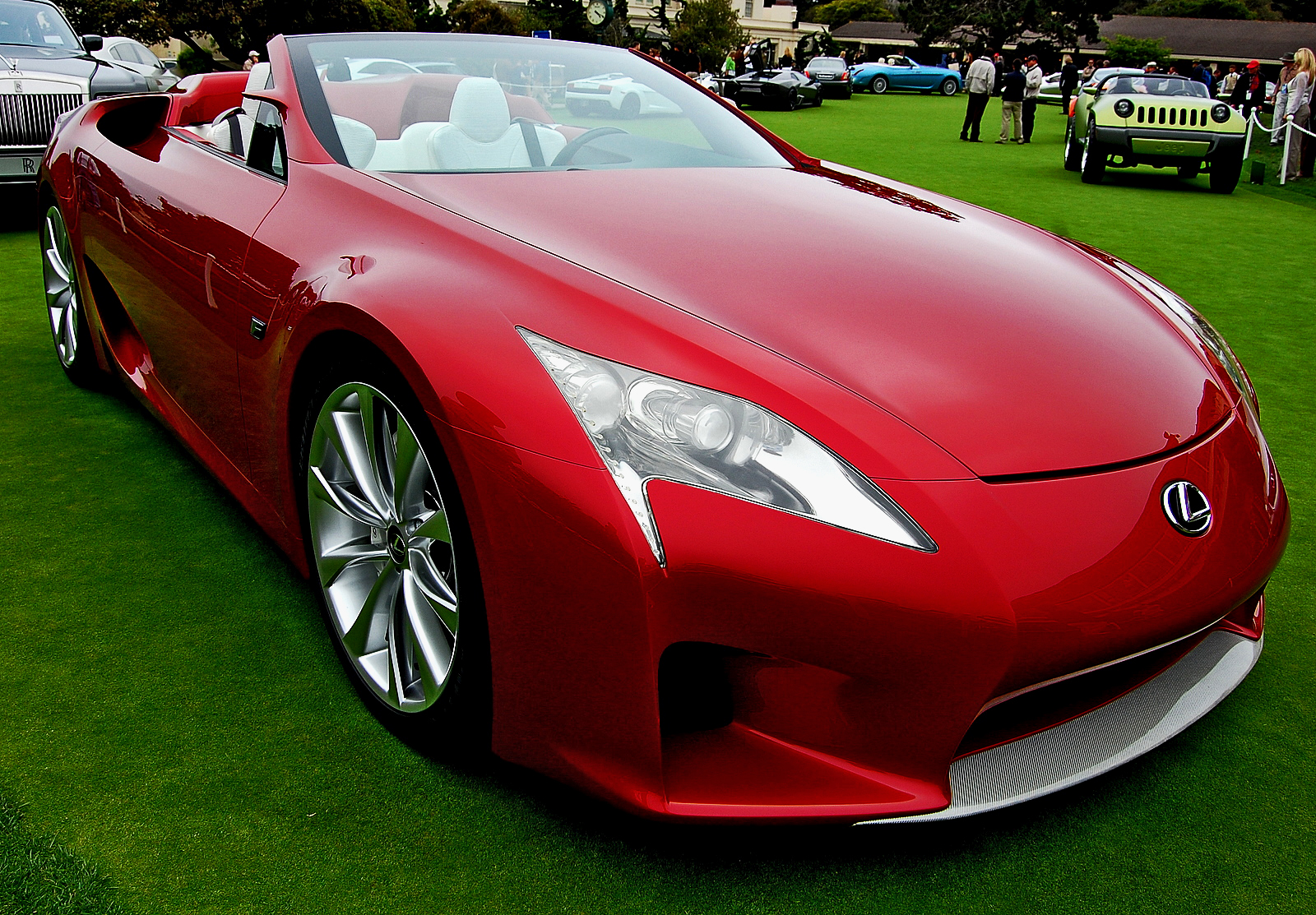
Lexus LF-A Roadster at the 2008 Pebble Beach Concours d'Elegance.

Designated LF-AR or LF-A Roadster, the roadster version of the LF-A concept car was first displayed at the North American International Auto Show in Detroit on January 13, 2008. Derived from the LF-A, the designation stands for Lexus Future-Advance Roadster. Initial specifications for the roadster are a V10 engine under 5.0 L with over 500 hp (373 kW) and a top speed of over 200 mph (320 km/h). The LF-A Roadster was also revealed to have a retractable rear spoiler for improved handling at speed. The LF-A Roadster show model featured side cameras in place of standard mirrors, and a two-tone interior. The model was designated with "F" badges indicating its place as a member of the Lexus F performance division.

After its debut at the 2008 North American International Auto Show, the LF-A Roadster was also shown at the 2008 Pebble Beach Concours d'Elegance, the 2008 Geneva Motor Show, the United States Open Championship tournament, and at Lexus exhibits in Japan. On August 12, 2009, news reports suggested that the LF-A would be released as the LF-L, with the change in name from A to L to signify its appearances at Le Mans and to draw on its pre-production racing development. However, a production non-convertible designated LFA premiered in October 2009.

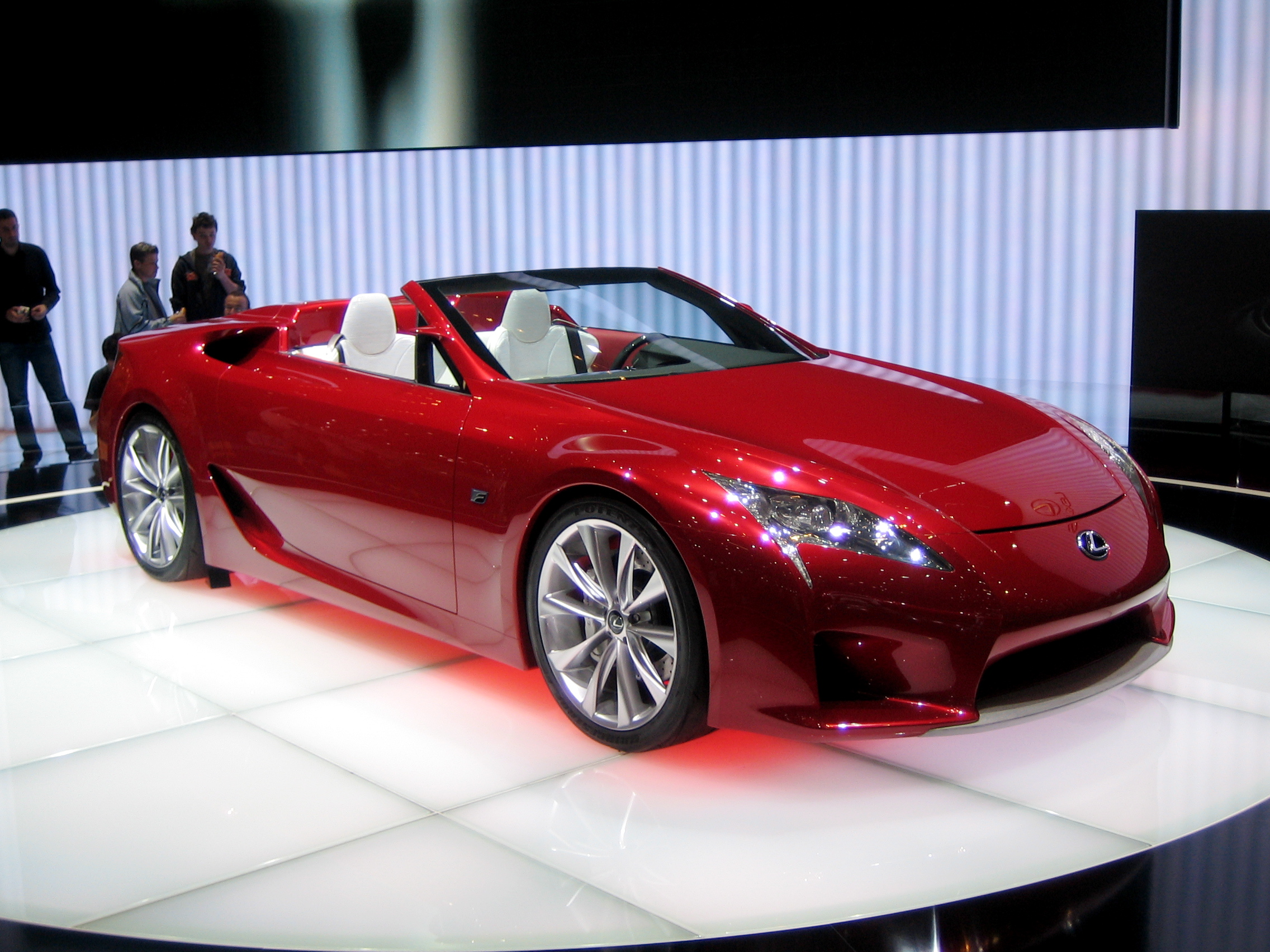
LF-A Roadster.

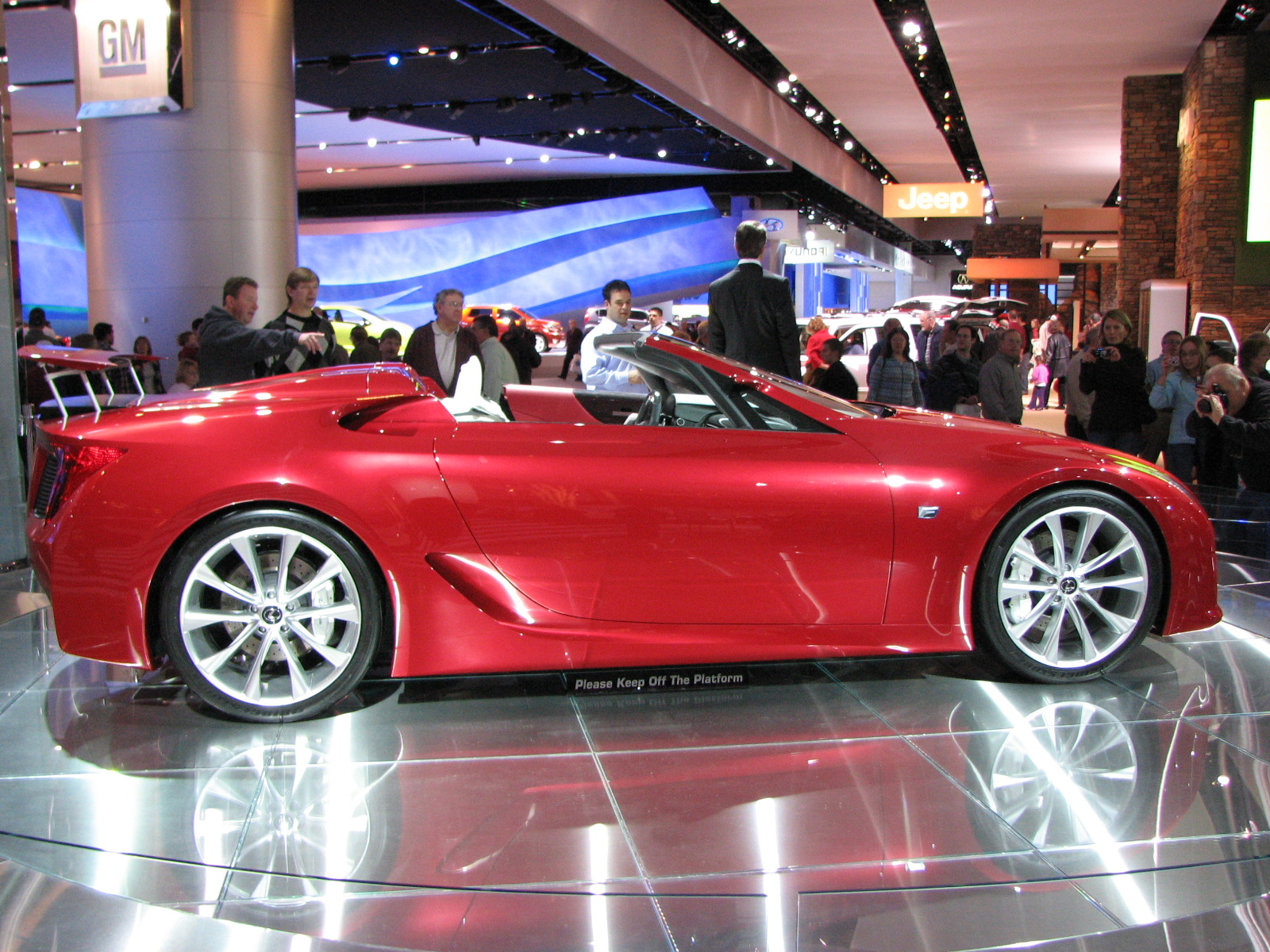
Side of the LF-A Roadster.

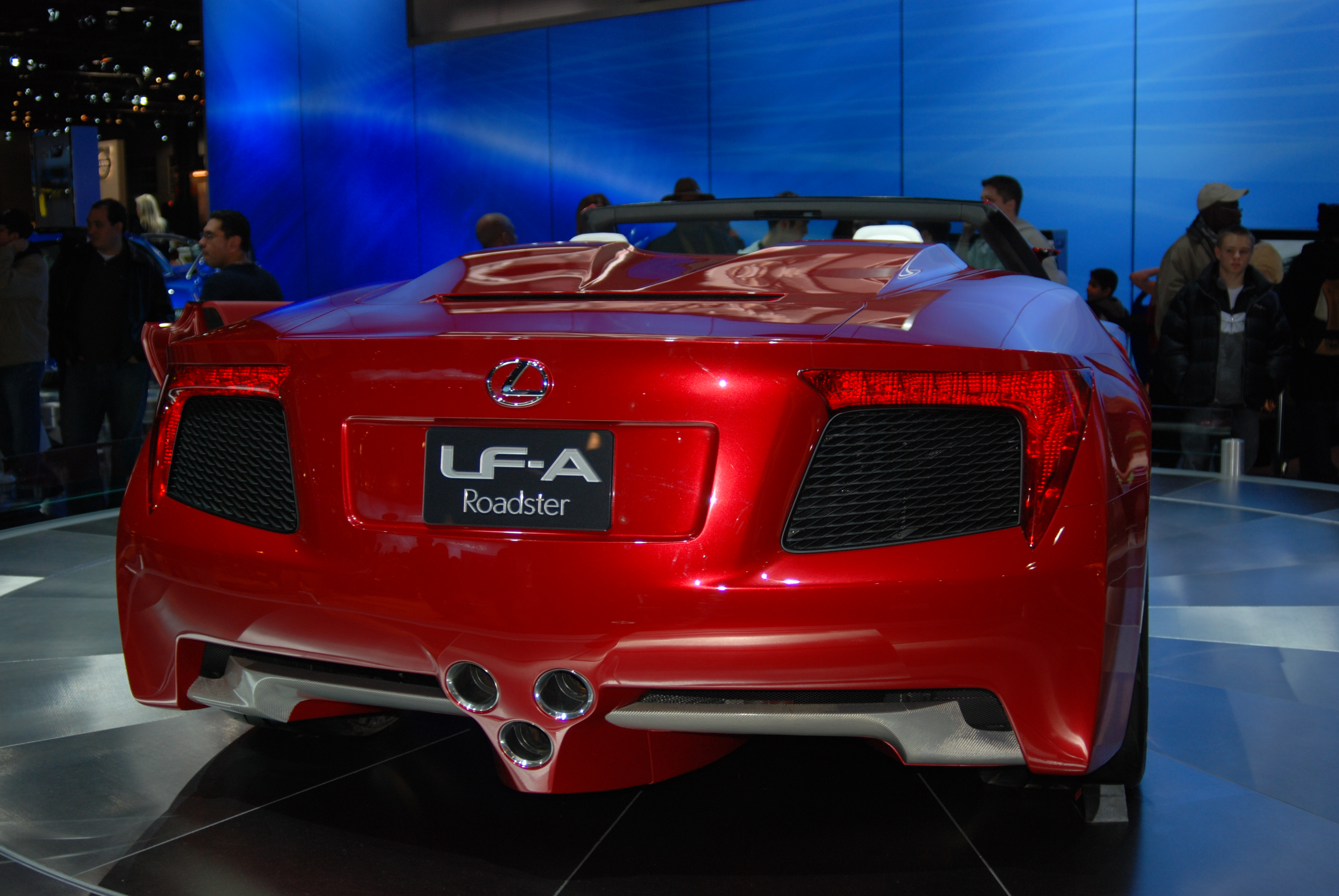
Rear of the LF-A Roadster.

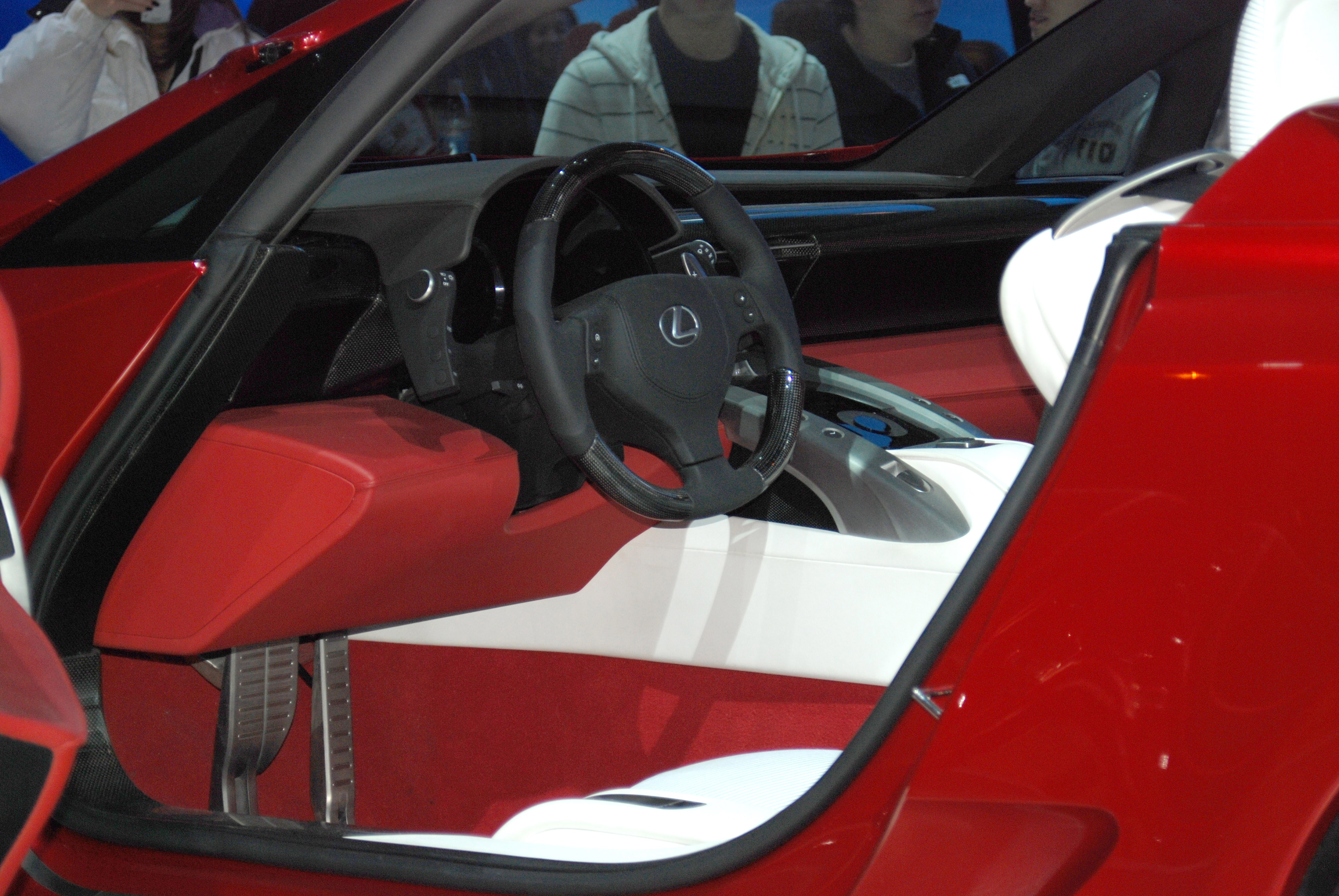
Interior of the LF-A Roadster.

== LF-C ==
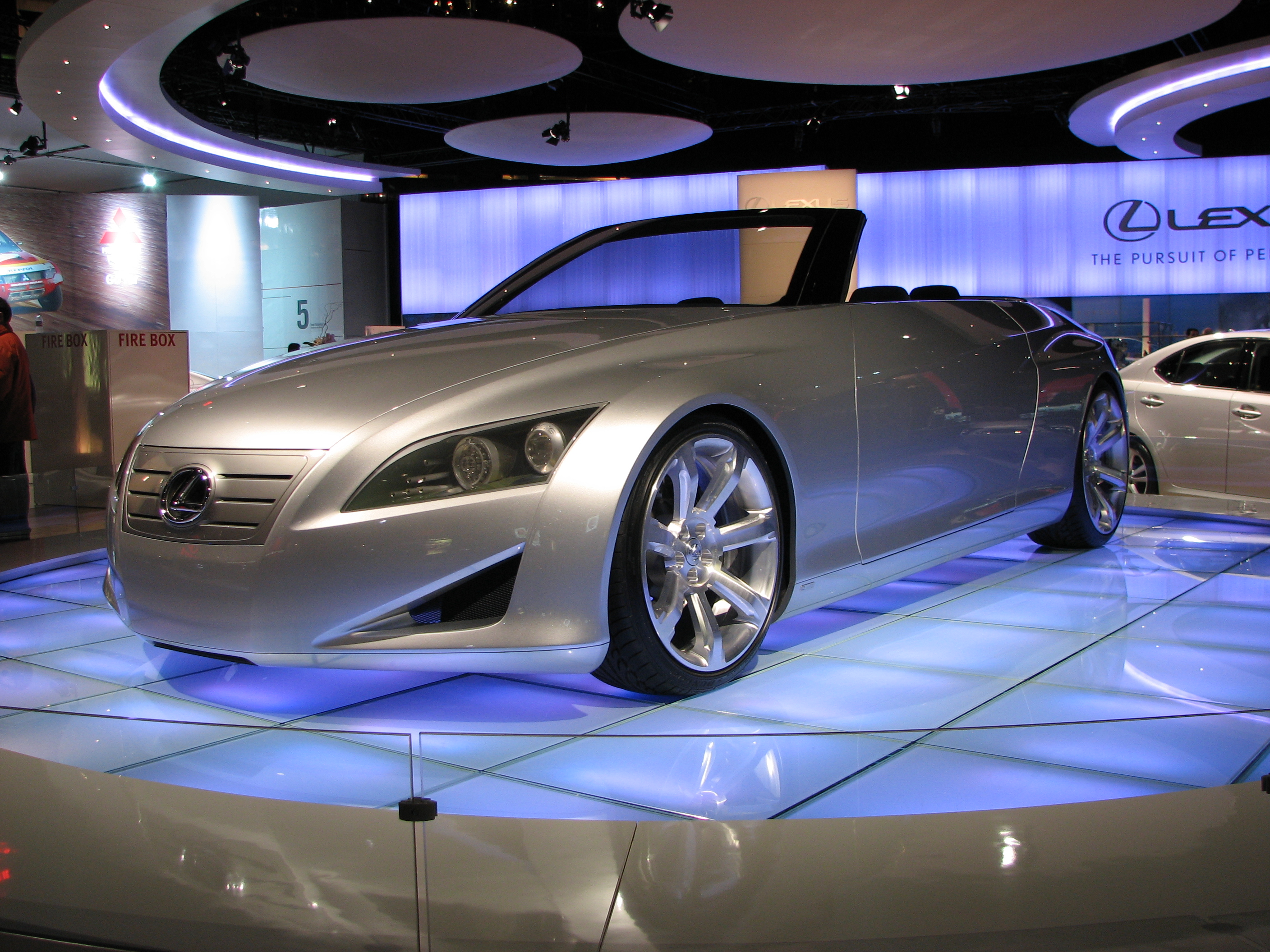
Lexus LF-C concept at the 2007 Canadian International AutoShow.

The LF-C is a concept car Lexus unveiled at the 2004 New York Auto Show. This concept featured a retractable hardtop design which allowed for coupe, convertible, targa, or speedster configurations via a four-position glass roof. The designation stands for Lexus Future-Coupe. The LF-C is fitted with a V8 engine and rear-wheel drive. Unique features included a one-touch activation button, crystal LED taillamps, suede bucket seats, a 3D instrument panel, drive-by-wire, and a translucent crystal center console with blue backlighting. The LF-C also featured retractable rear-view cameras in place of side mirrors on the doors and rear bumper.

The design choices shown in the LF-C hinted at a convertible version of the IS 250/350. Design cues from the LF-C, particularly in the front fascia, appeared in production form with the debut of the second generation Lexus IS. The LF-C concept measured 178.7 in (4,539.0 mm) long, 73.0 in (1,850 mm) wide, and 53.5 in (1,358.9 mm) in height, with a wheelbase of 110.0 in (2,790 mm).

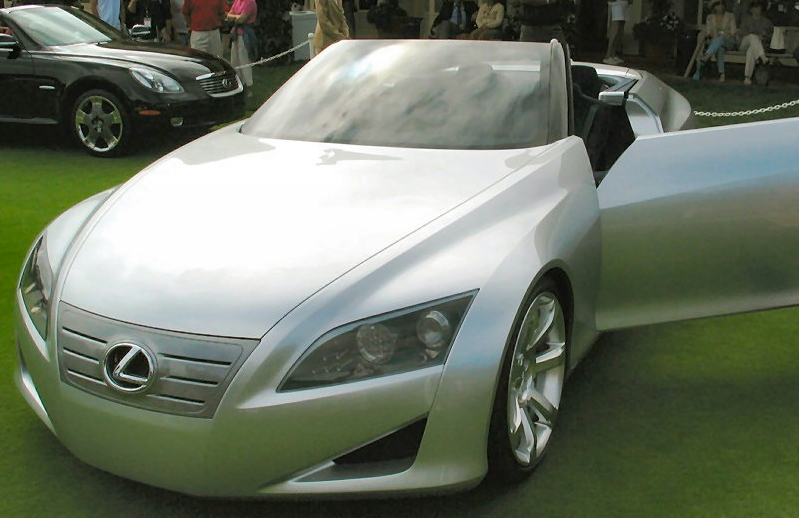
LF-C

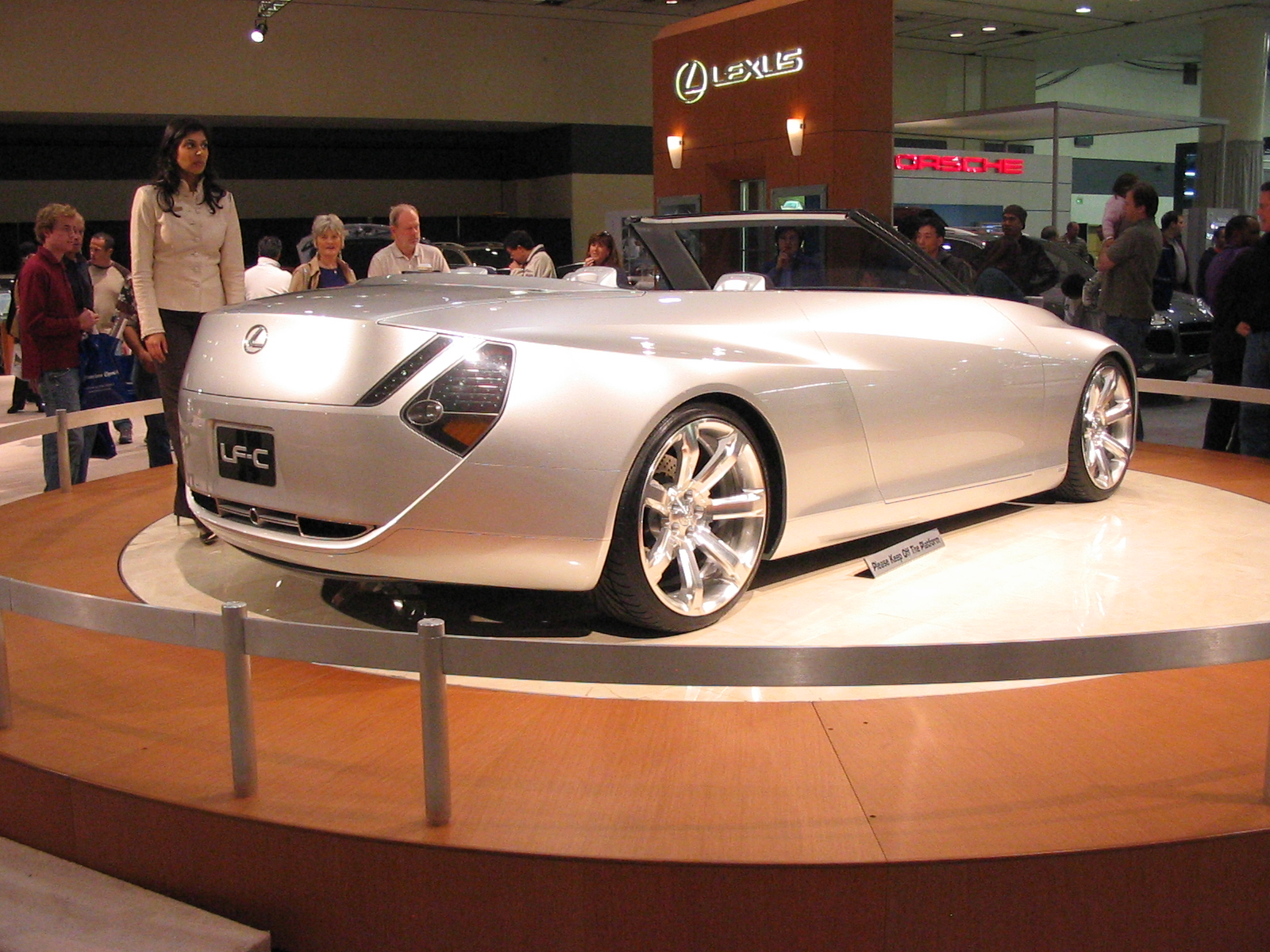
The LF-C

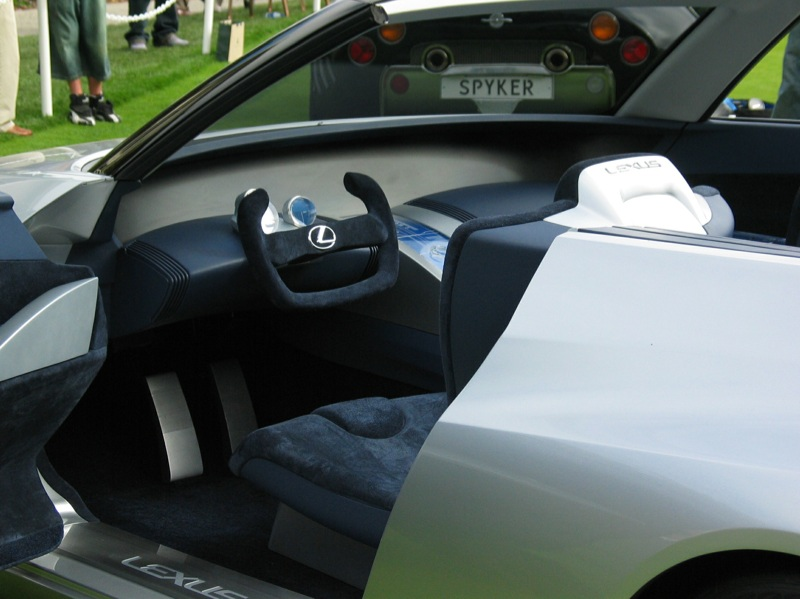
Interior of the LF-C.

== LF-C2 ==
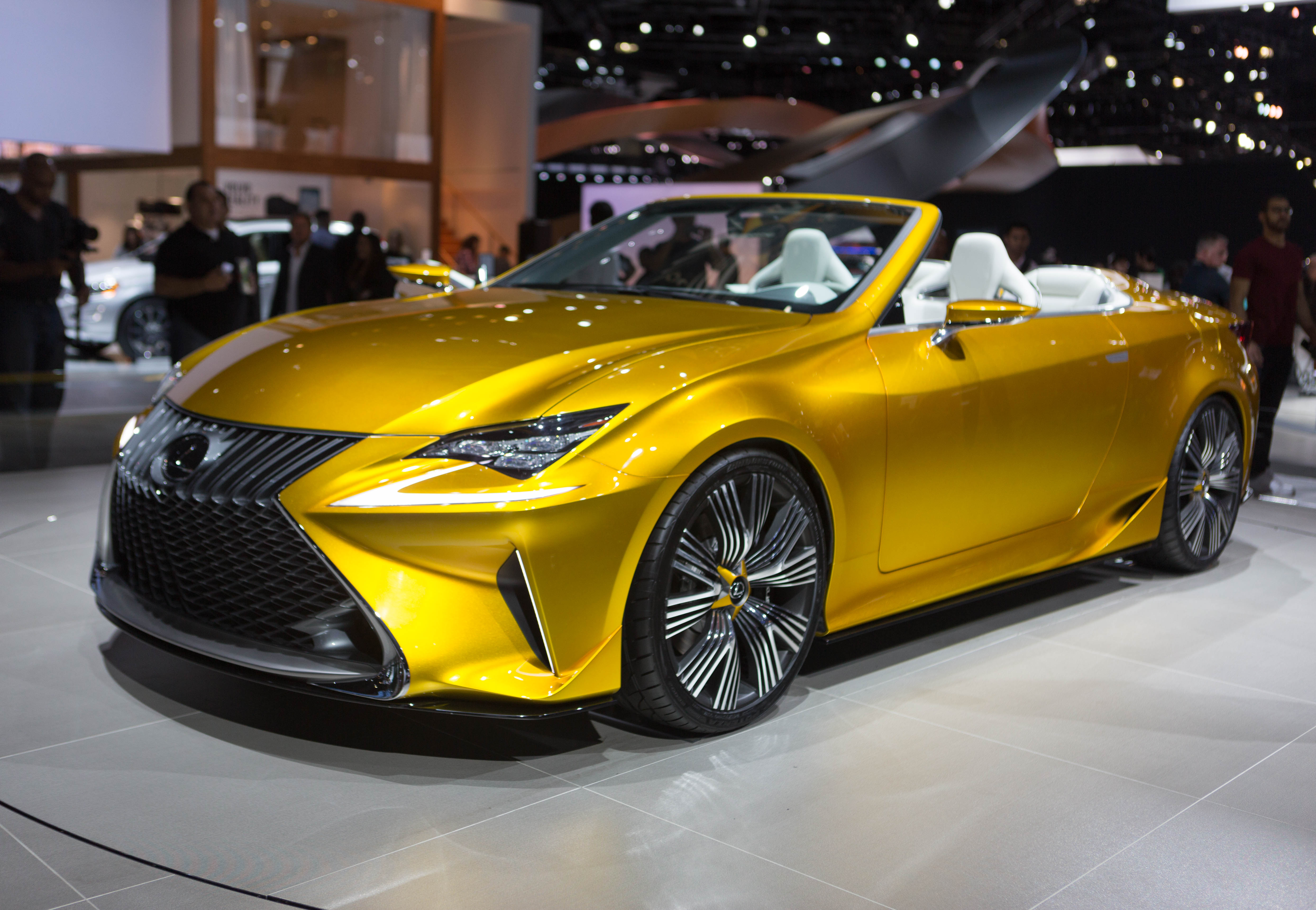
Lexus LF-C2

The LF-C2 is a concept car Lexus unveiled at the 2014 Los Angeles Auto Show.

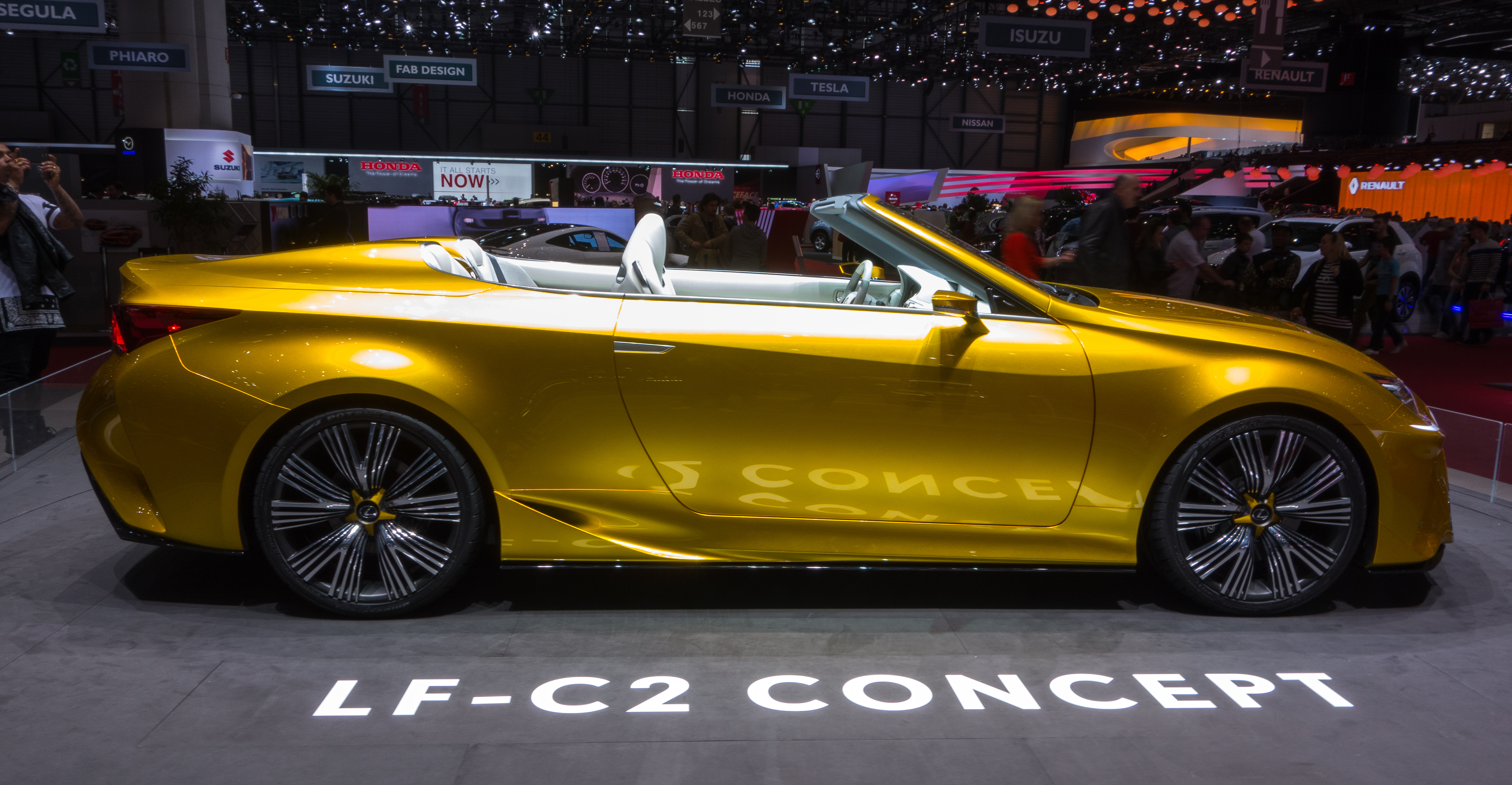
Side profile view.

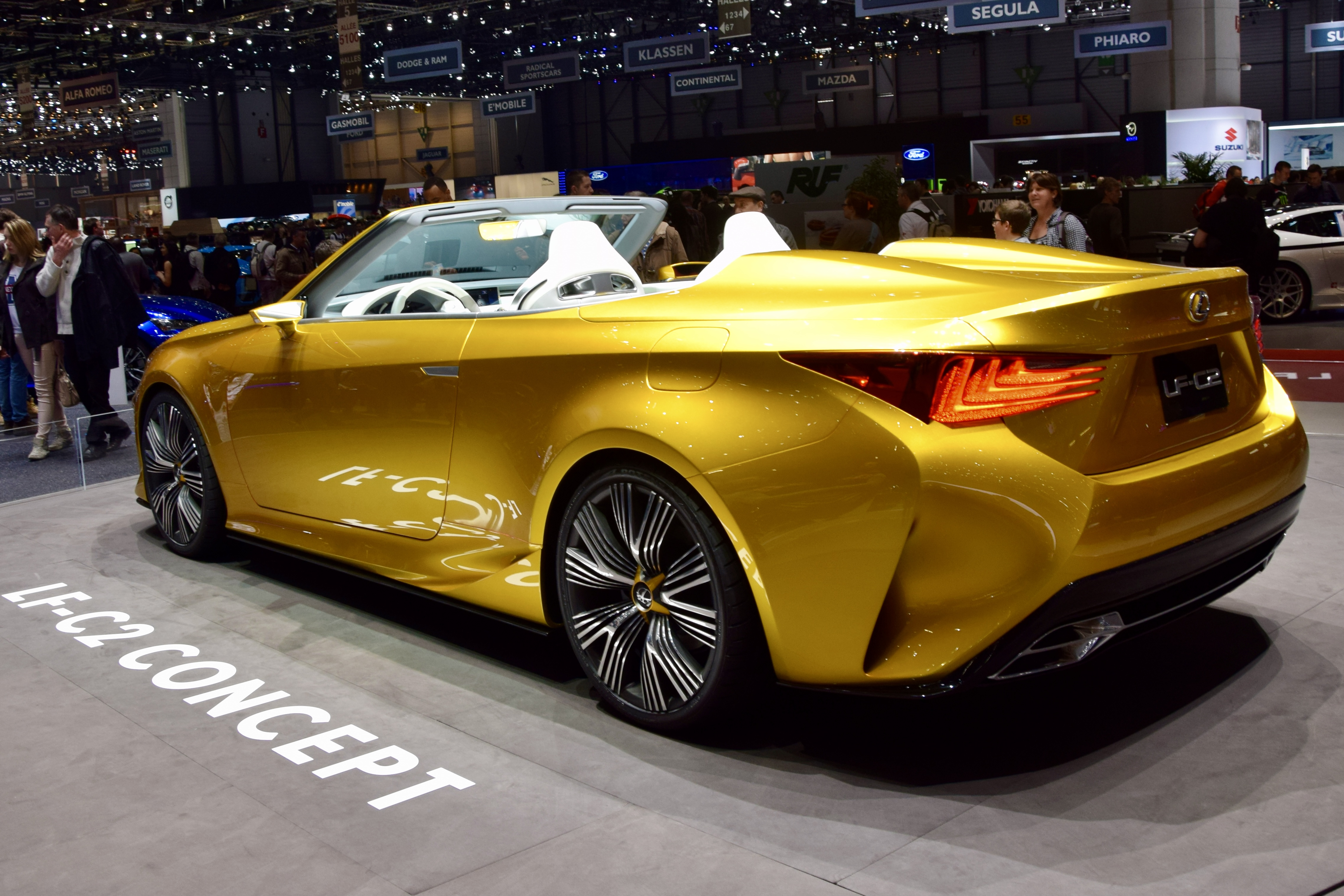
Rear Quarter profile view.

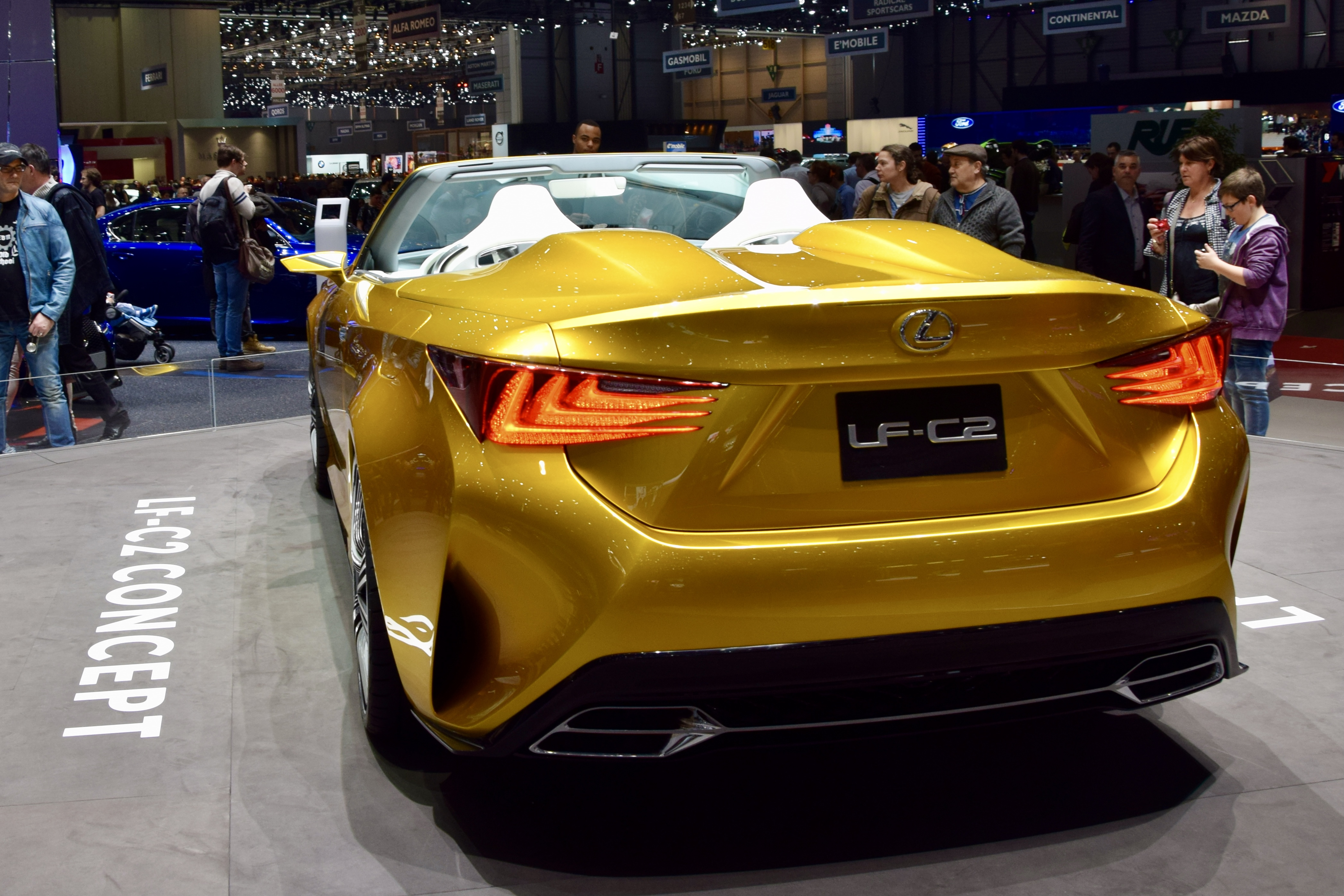
Rear profile view.

== LF-Ch ==
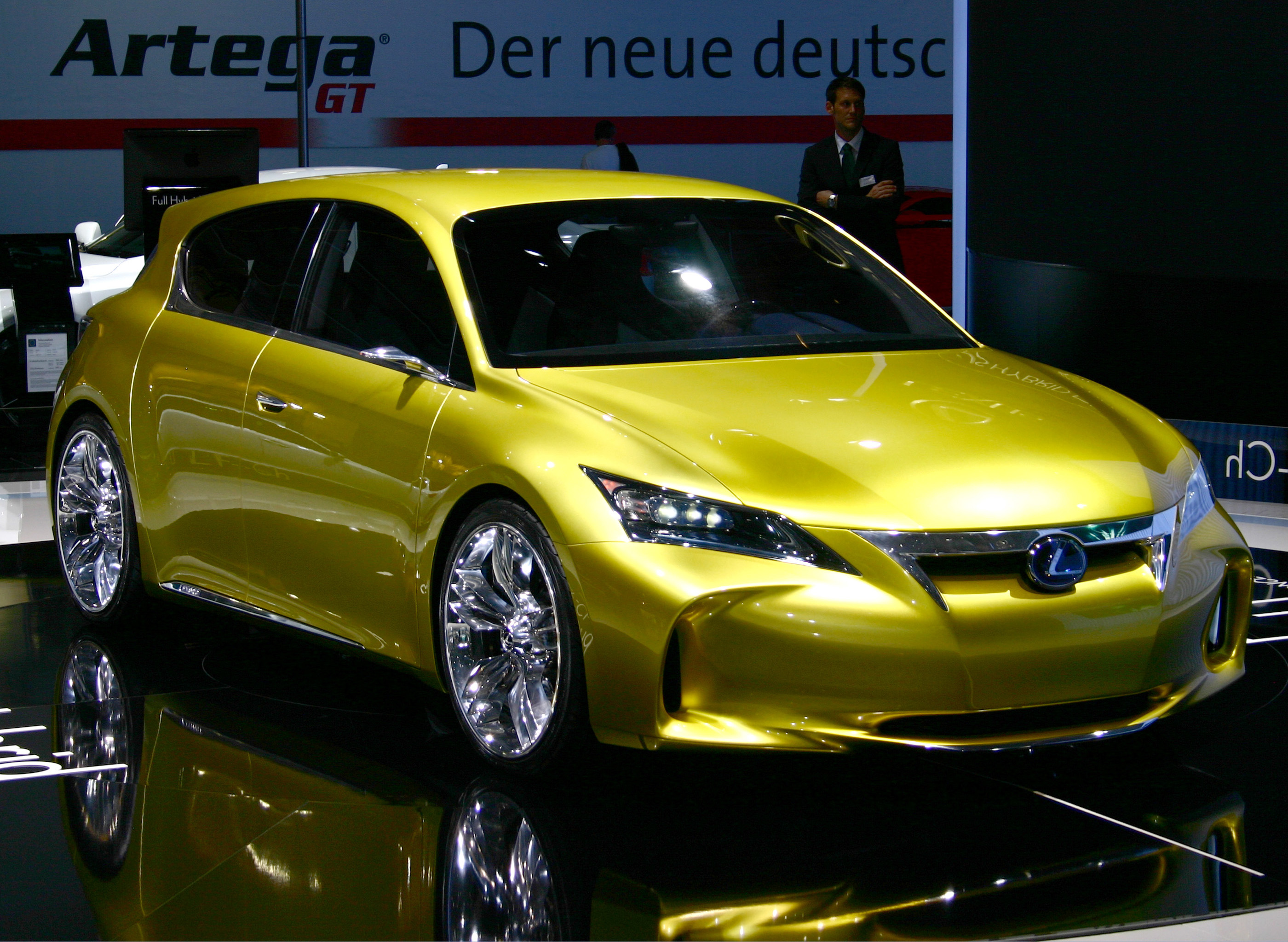
Lexus LF-Ch hybrid concept at the 2009 Frankfurt Motor Show

The LF-Ch is a concept four-door hatchback Lexus unveiled in September 2009 at the Frankfurt International Motor Show. The designation refers to Lexus Future-Compact hybrid. The LF-Ch exterior featured a more aggressive interpretation of the L-finesse design language, with an arching roofline, rear spoiler, and single-bar grille. The rear door handles were integrated into the C-pillar window trim. The concept was equipped with a hybrid 2.4 L inline-four gasoline engine with an electric motor. Inside, the LF-Ch featured wood, polished aluminum, and semi-aniline leather, along with paddle shifters, a turbine-style instrument panel, and Lexus' Remote Touch control interface with pop-up information screen. The rear seat featured entertainment options in the form of headrest-mounted iPhone docks.

The LF-Ch was intended to preview a forthcoming premium compact vehicle, which was expected to enter production in the near future and targeted at European markets. Such a vehicle, originally codenamed C-Premium in early press reports, was designated CT 200h, CT 300h, or CT 400h in trademark applications filed in June 2009 in the US and in Canada. The LF-Ch concept measured 4,300 mm (169.3 in) long, 1,790 mm (70.5 in) wide, and 1,400 mm (55.1 in) in height, with a wheelbase of 2,600 mm (102.4 in). It may very well presumptively be a Lexus based on the Toyota Corolla.

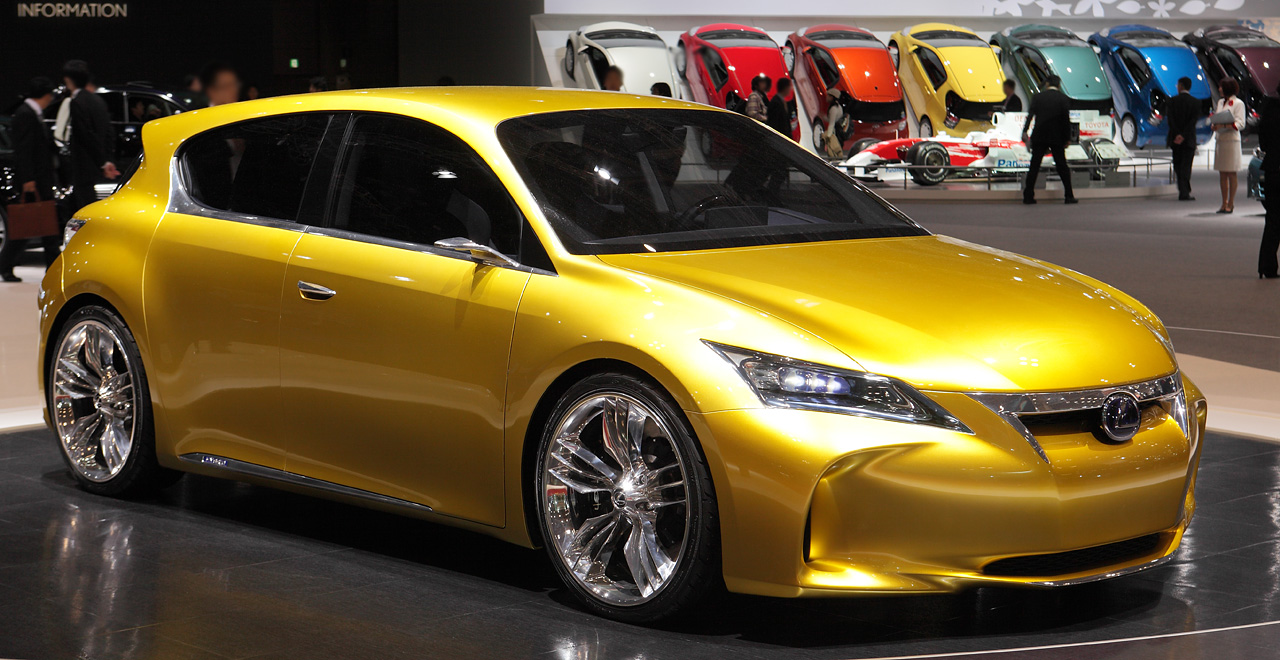
At the IAA 2009.

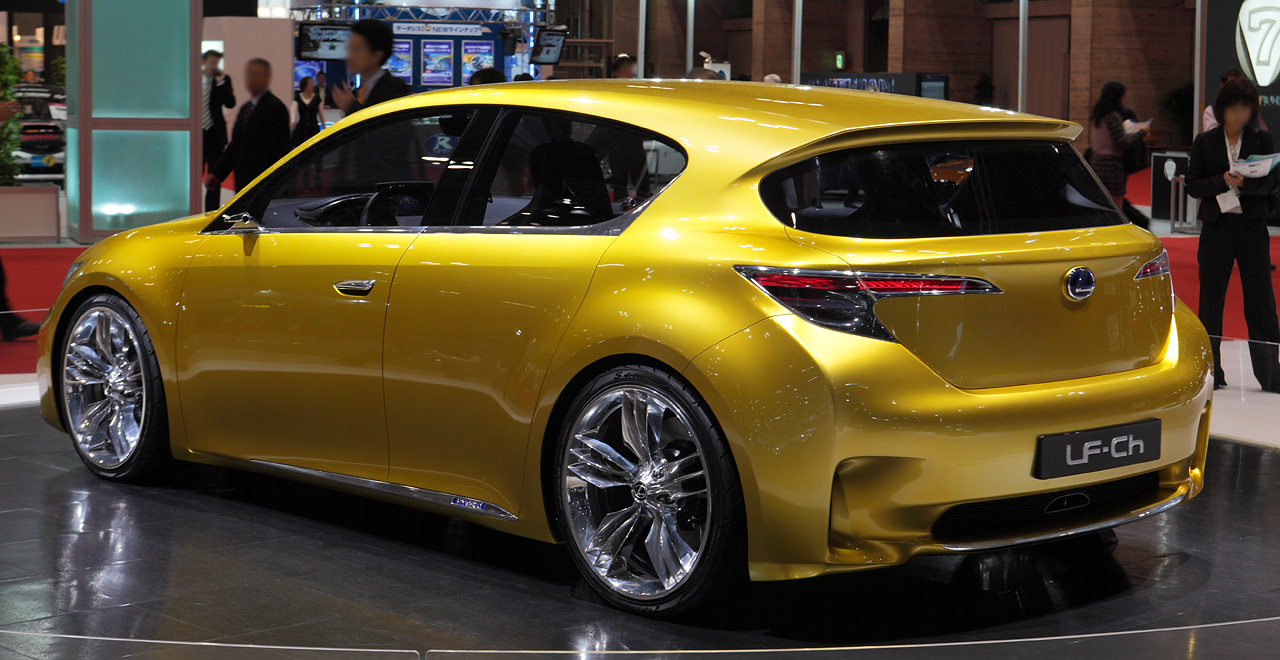
LF-Ch rear quarter.

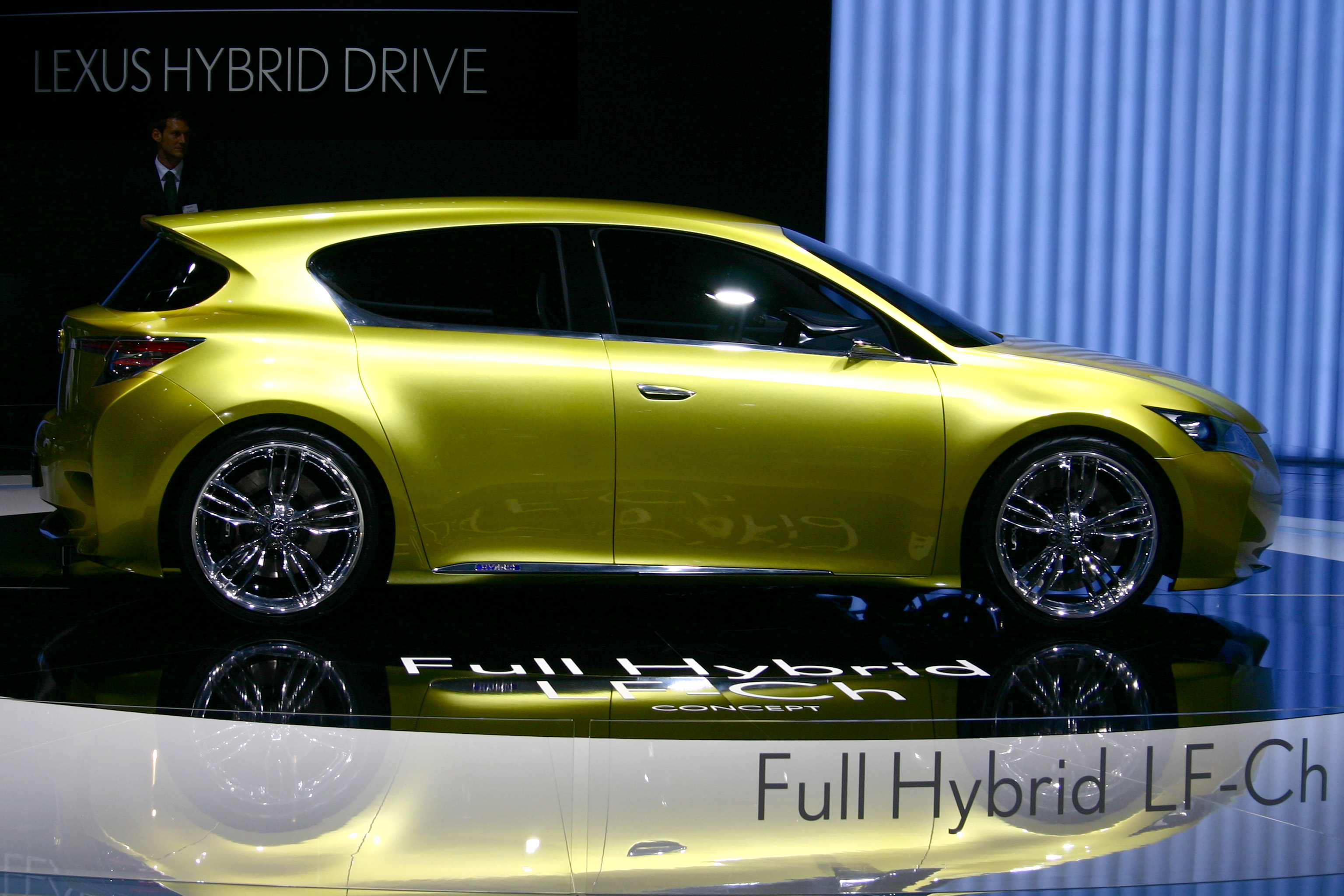
Side profile view.

== LF-CC ==
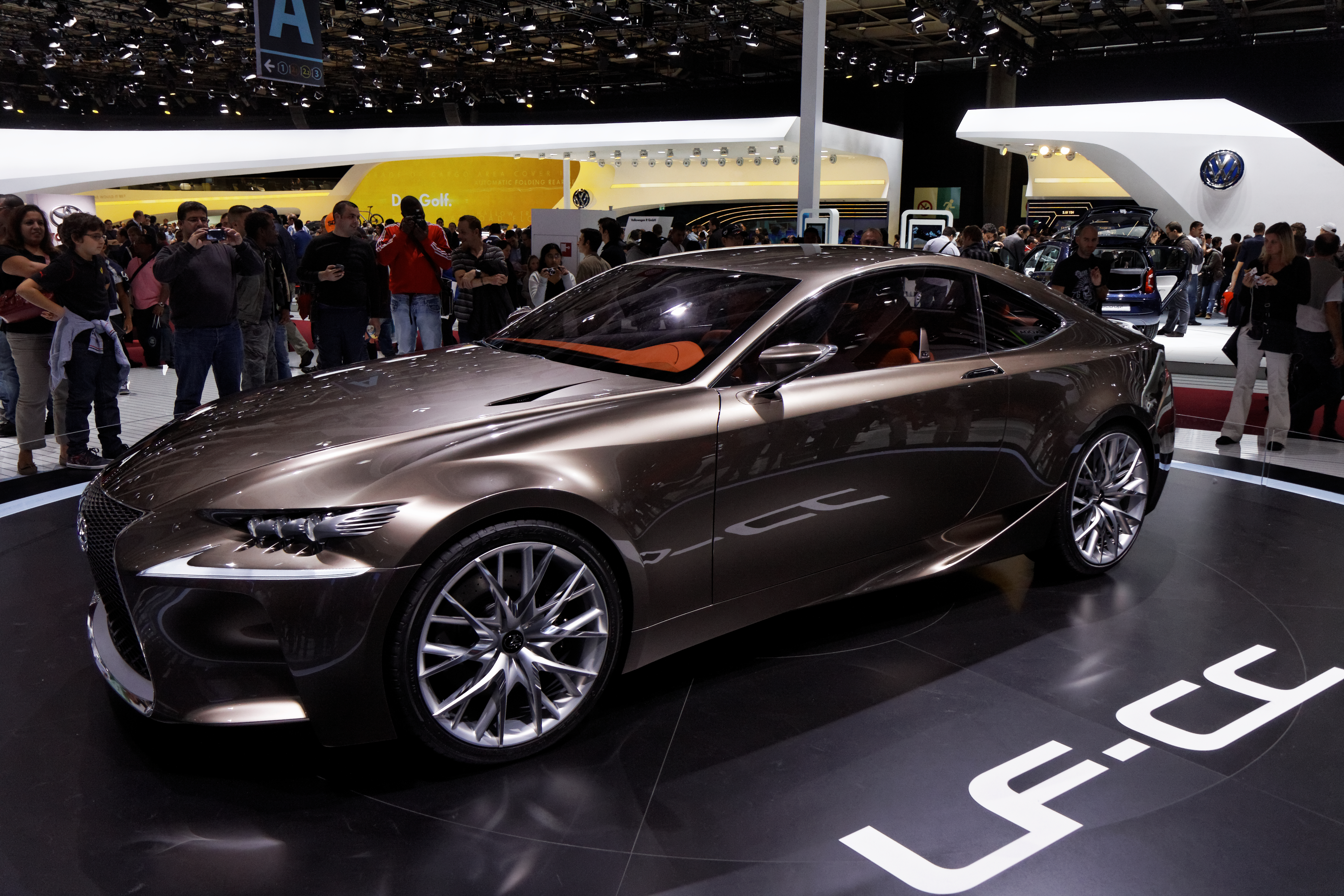
Lexus LF-CC concept at Mondial de l'Automobile de Paris 2012

The LF-CC (Lexus Future-Compact Coupe) is a concept car revealed at the October 2012 Paris Motor Show as a preview of the next generation Lexus IS. The LF-CC concept is a rear-wheel drive coupe incorporating designs from LF-LC concept and Lexus LFA. It includes a 2.5 litre 4-cylinder Atkinson cycle petrol engine with D-4S direct injection technology, water-cooled permanent magnet electric motor, 3 LED-projector headlamp design, daytime running lights integrated into the upper bumper surface, rear spoiler integrated within the boot lid, L-shaped combination lamps with three-dimensional design, Fluid Titanium body colour and a two-zone dashboard. The seats, door panels and instrument binnacle hood are upholstered in amber leather.

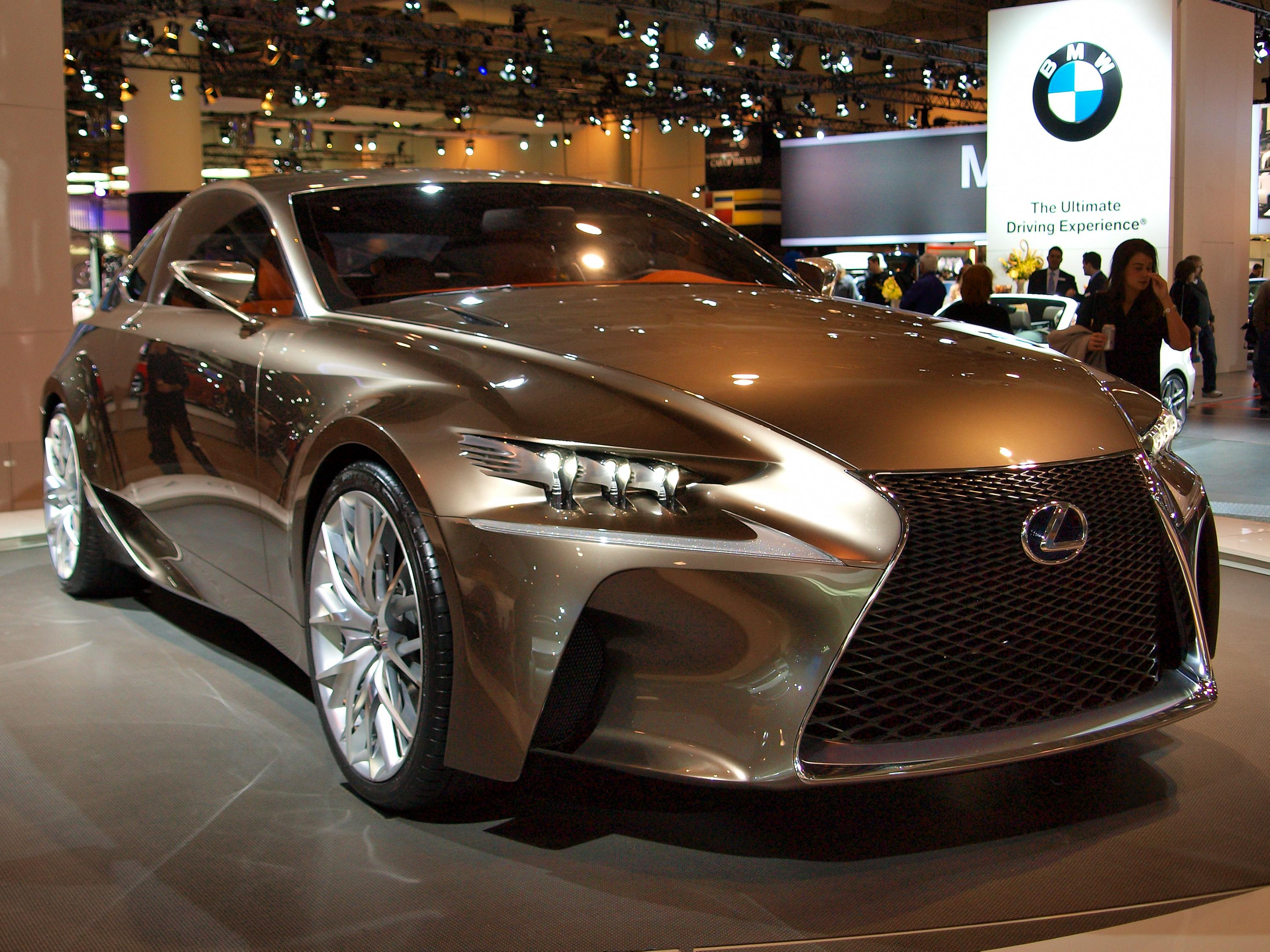
LF-CC at the Canadian International Auto Show

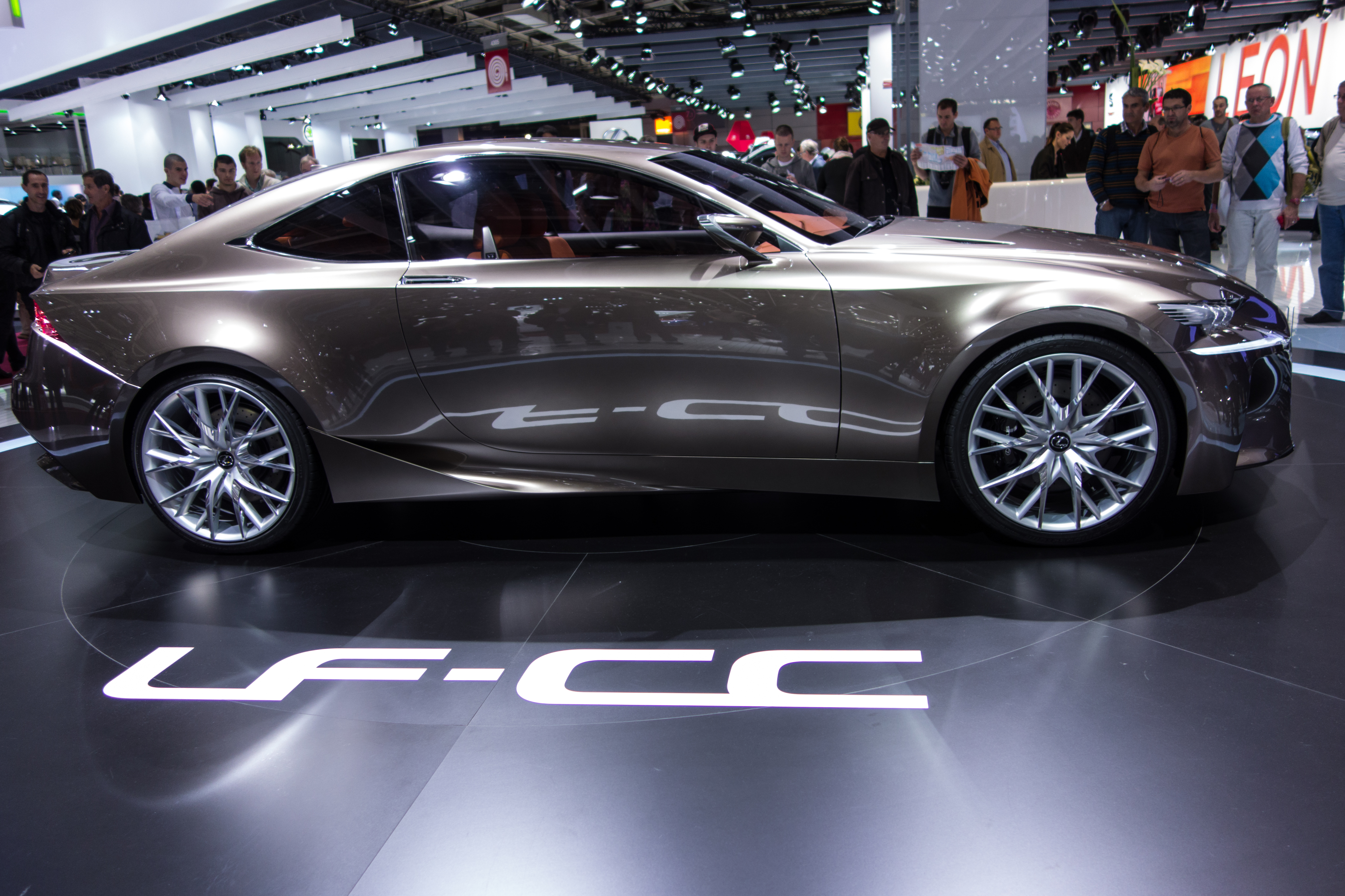
LF-CC side profile view

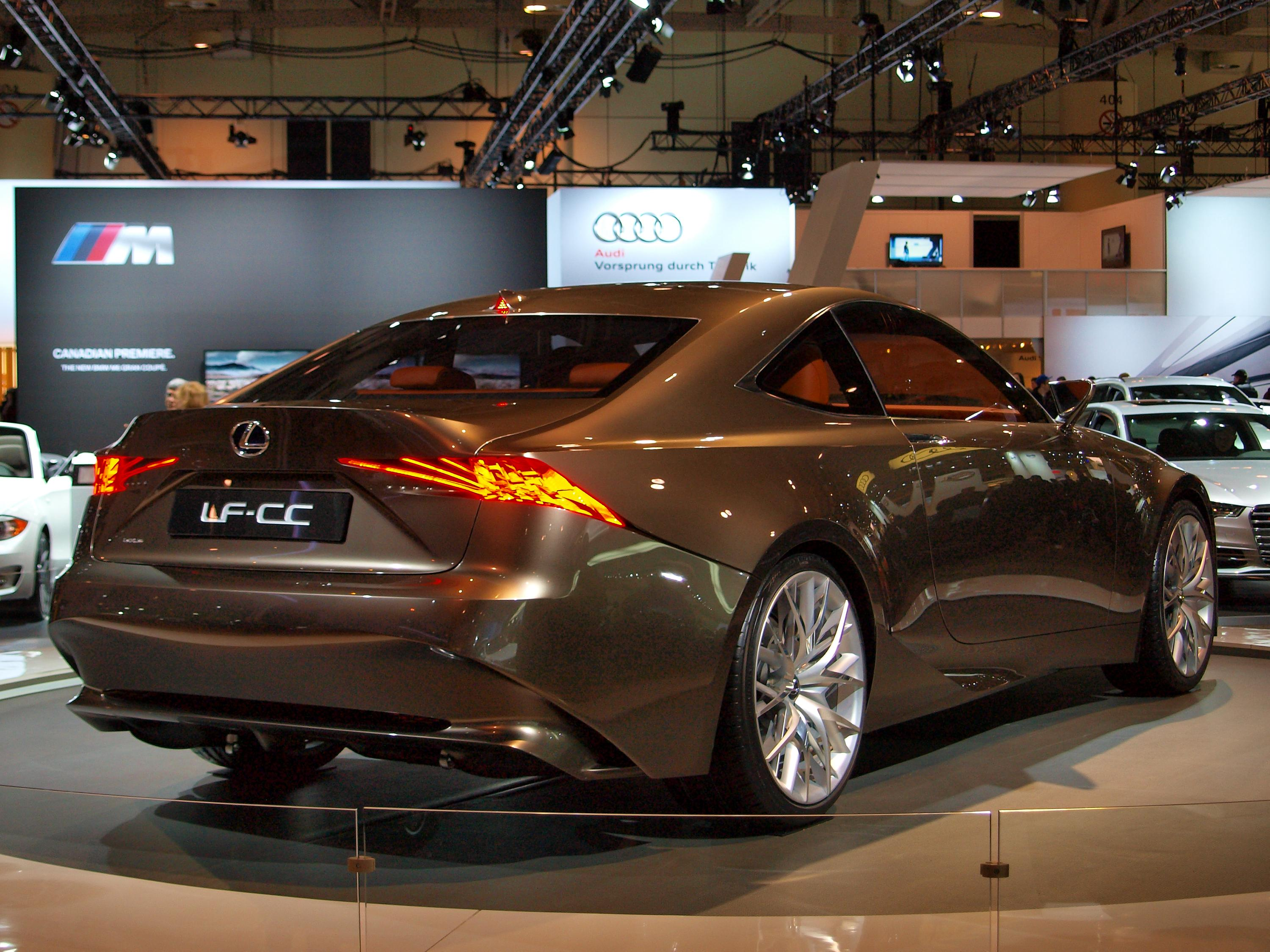
LF-CC rear view

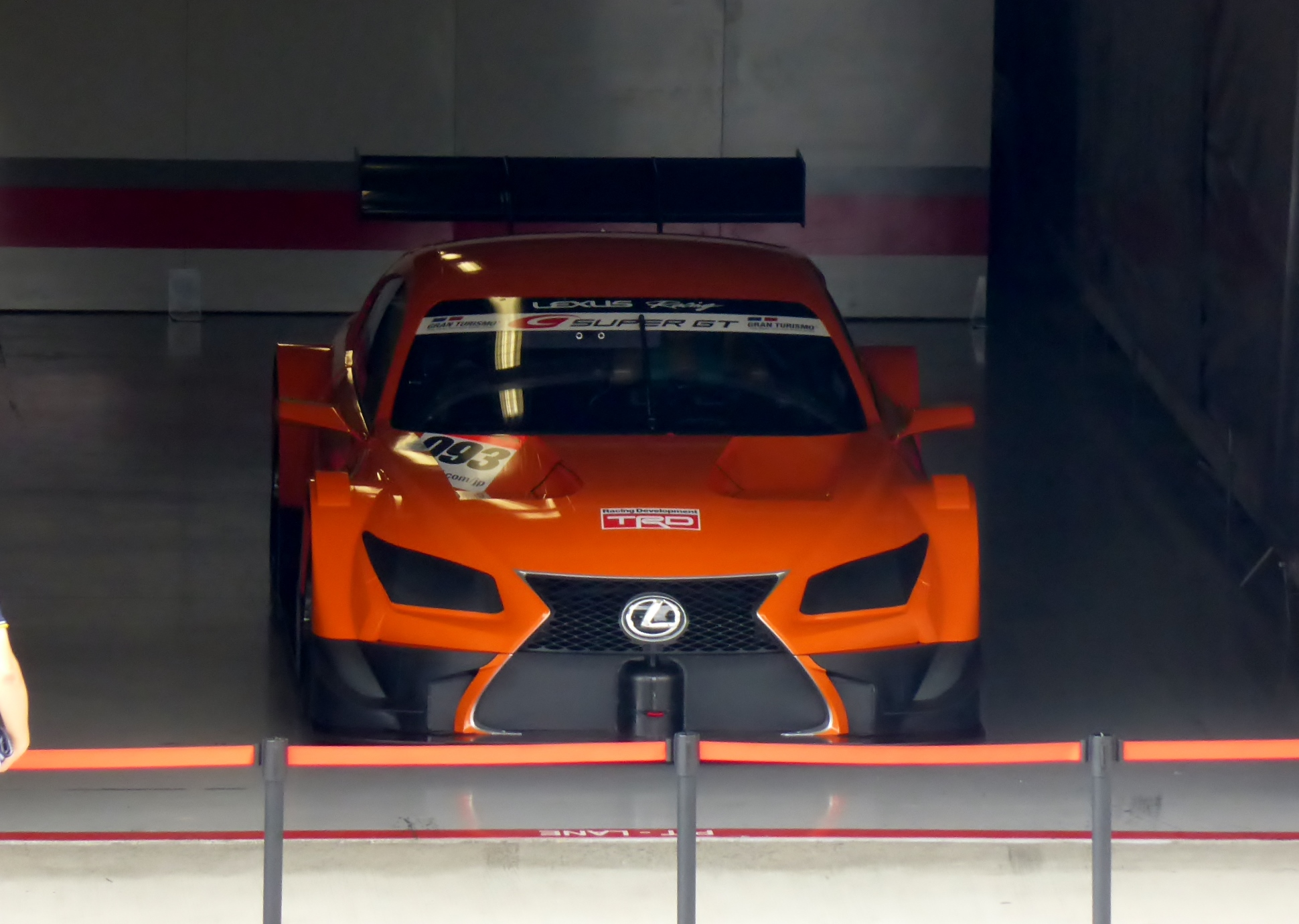
LF-CC GT500 at 2013 42nd International Pokka Sapporo 1000km

== LF-FC ==
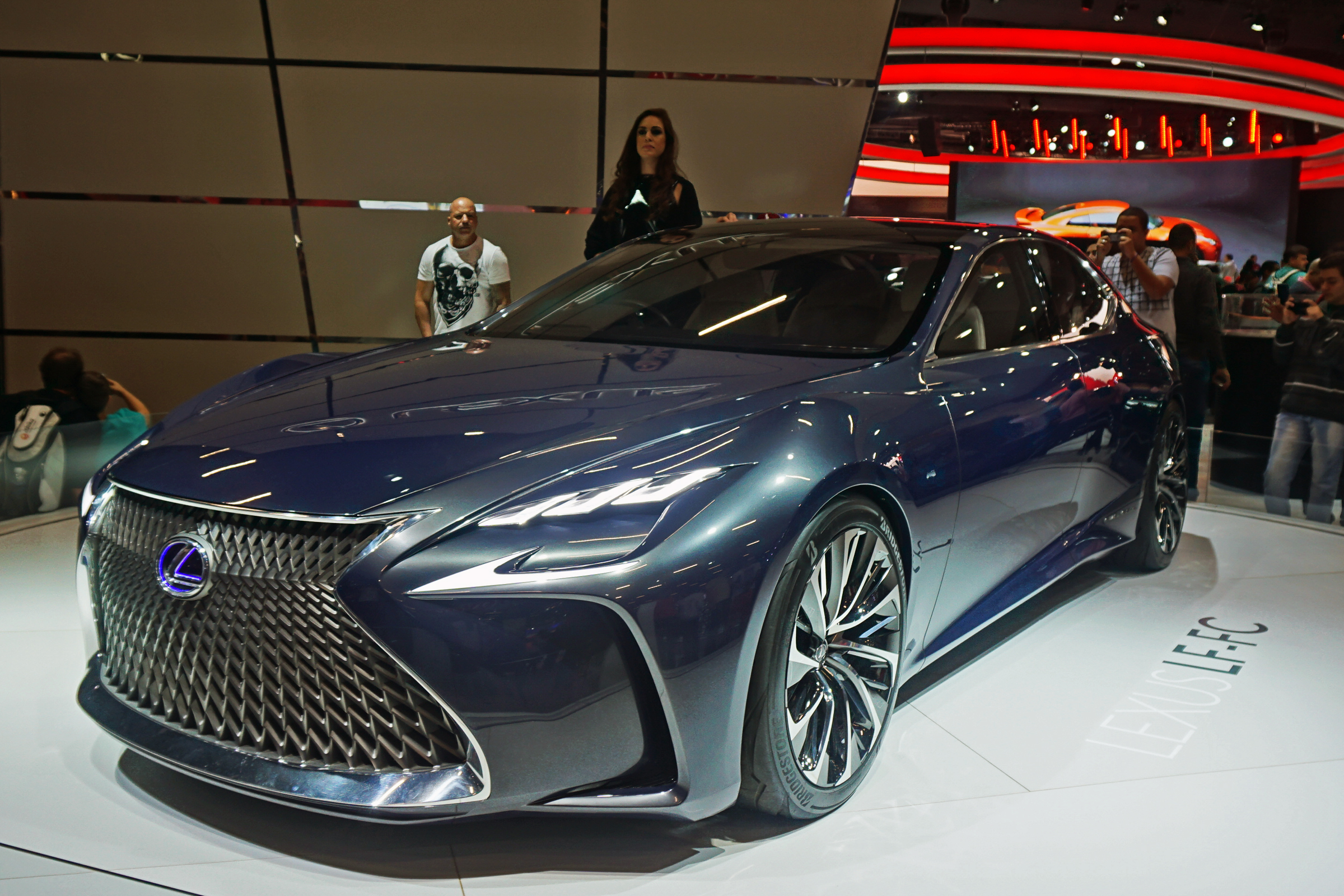
Lexus LF-FC hydrogen fuel cell concept exhibited at the 2016 São Paulo International Motor Show, Brazil.

The LF-FC (Lexus Future-Fuel Cell) is a concept car revealed at the October 2015 Tokyo Motor Show as a preview of the next generation Lexus LS.

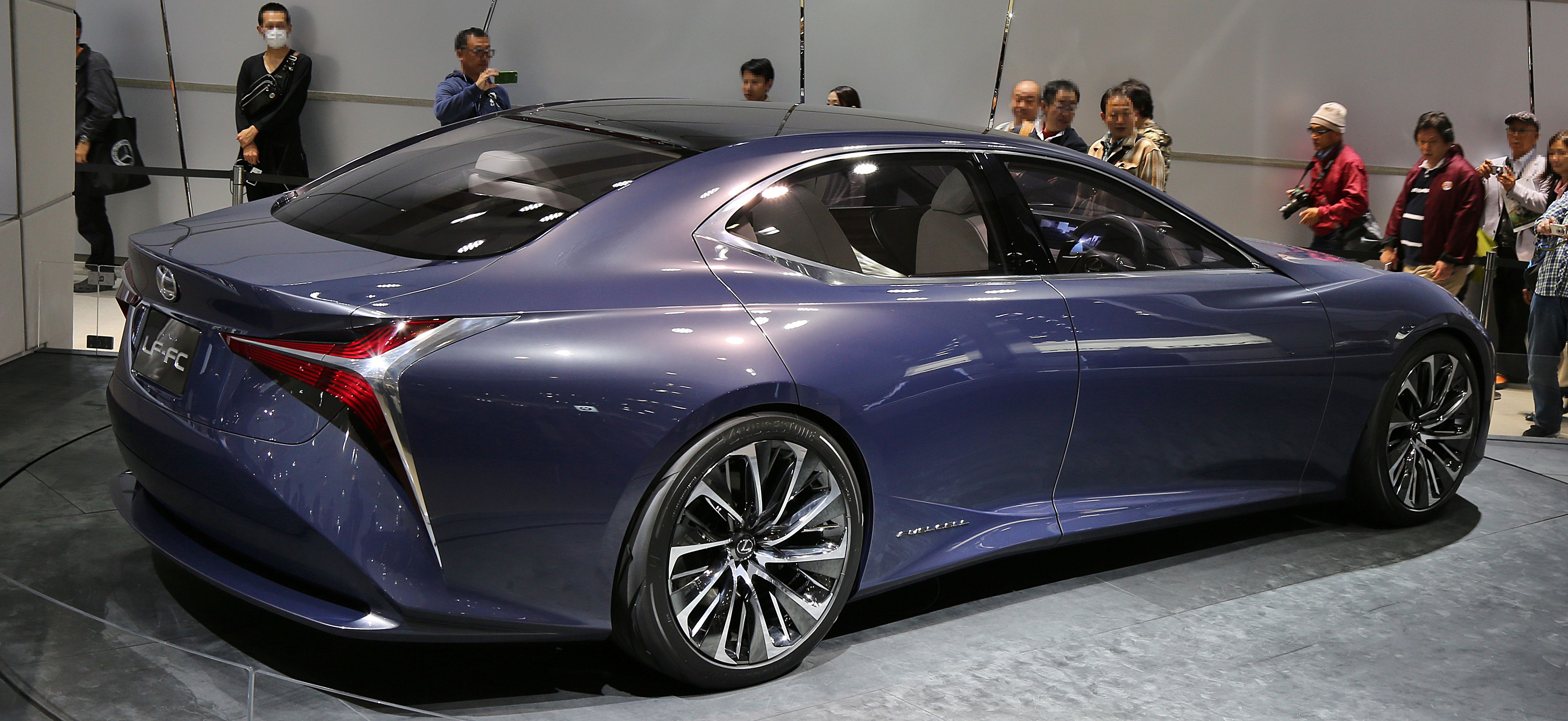
LF-FC rear view

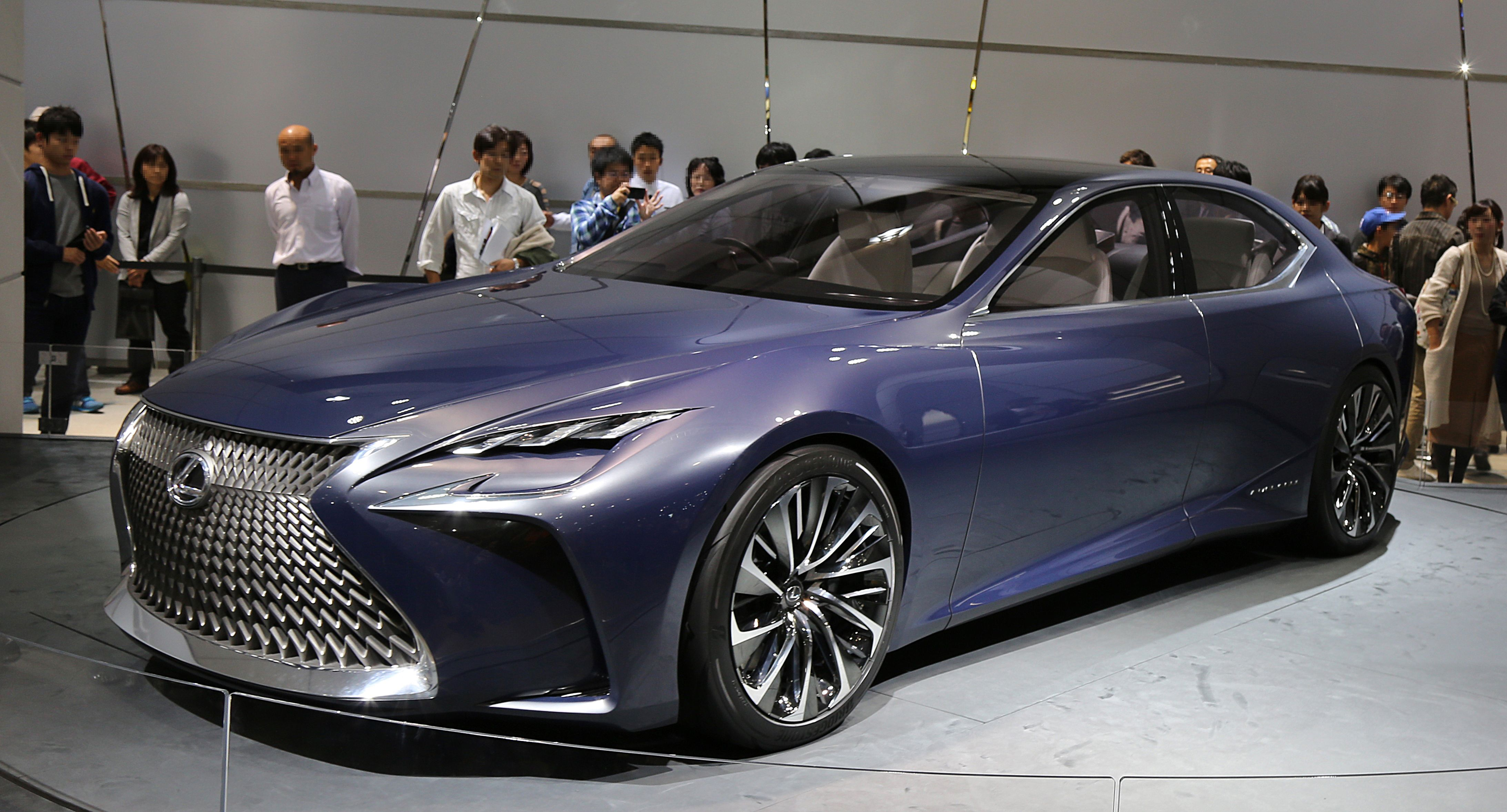
LF-FC front view

== LF-Gh ==
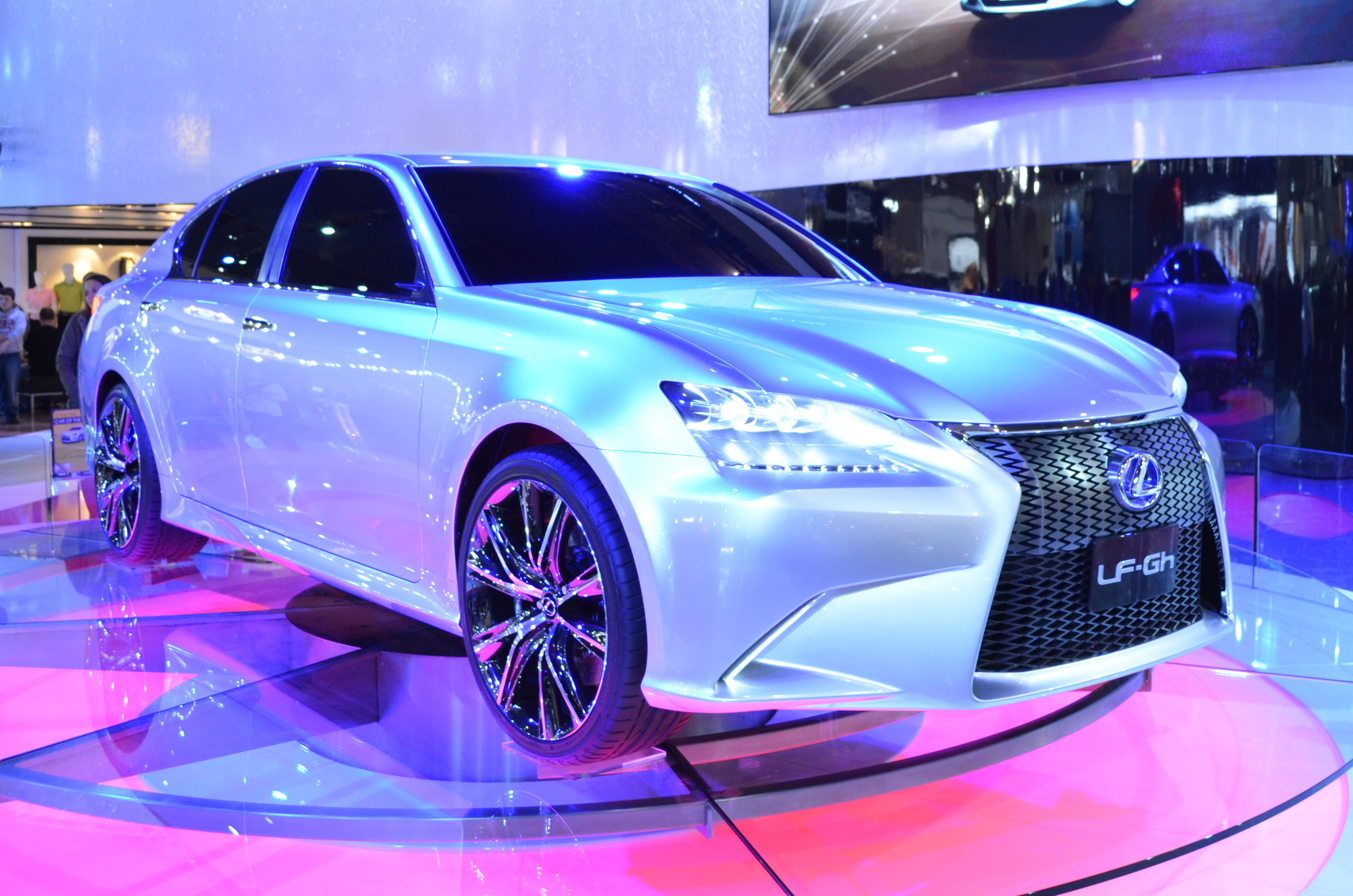
Lexus LF-Gh hybrid concept at the 2011 Melbourne International Auto Show

The LF-Gh which stands for Lexus Future Grand-touring Hybrid is Lexus's latest LF concept vehicle which debuted at the 2011 New York International Auto Show. The LF-Gh is a rear wheel drive hybrid platform powered by a Lexus Hybrid Drive powertrain. The LF-Gh also provide a hint of what future Lexus models, mainly the Lexus GS which was scheduled for late 2011, might look like. The front and the back of the LF-Gh is equipped with LED headlights, daytime running lights, and taillights. To improve aerodynamics the LF-Gh's door handles are sealed into the door panel and could be pushed to open out. the large spindle grille on the front of the LF-Gh brings out the aggressiveness of the design. Though the interior has been teased online, Lexus never once opened the doors of the LF-Gh to reveal the full interior, which is why most critics are rumoring that the LF-Gh is a nutshell concept, in which only the exterior has purpose, and the inside components are not made up.

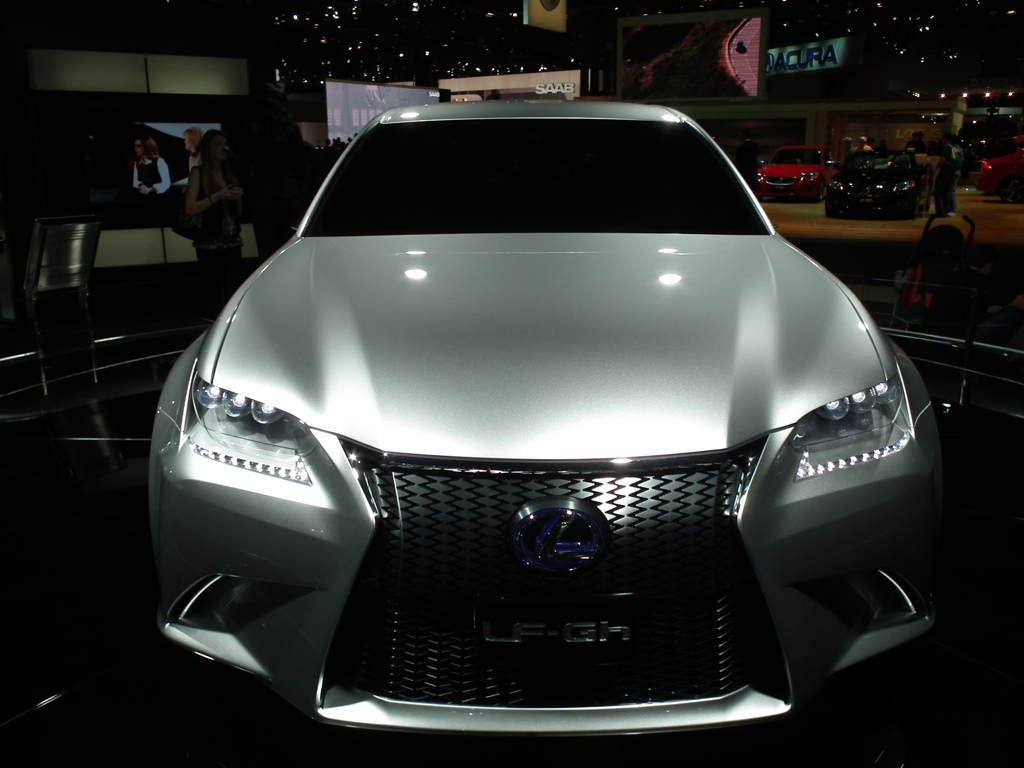
LF-Gh at the New York Auto show.

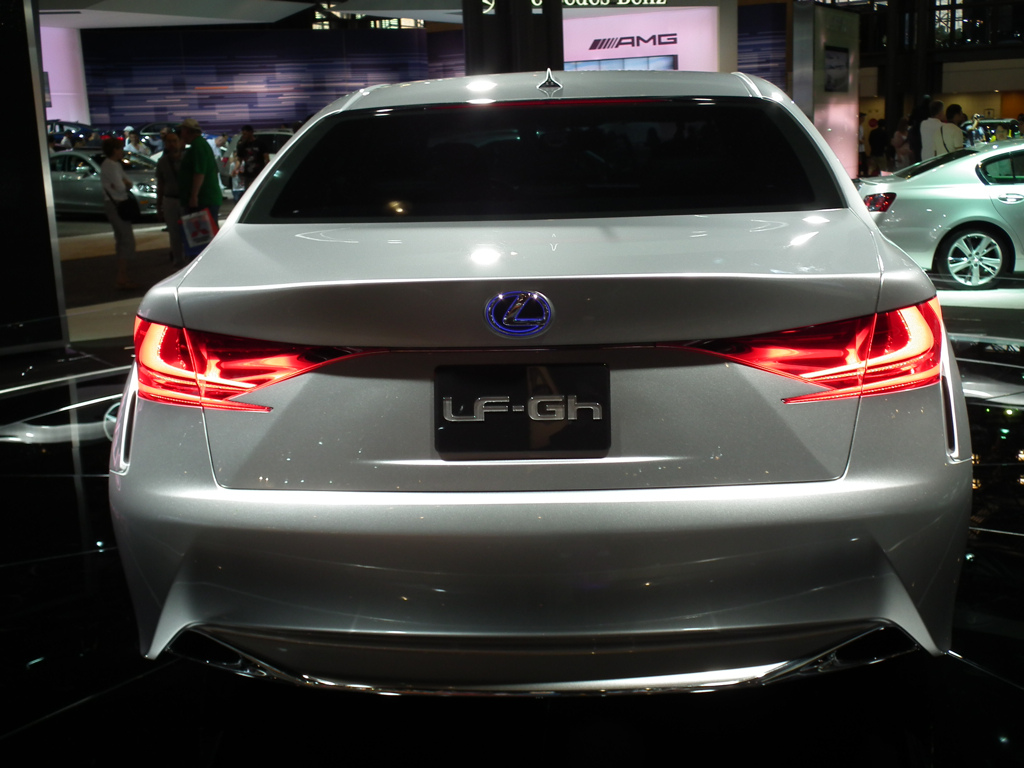
LF-Gh rear view.

== LF-LC ==
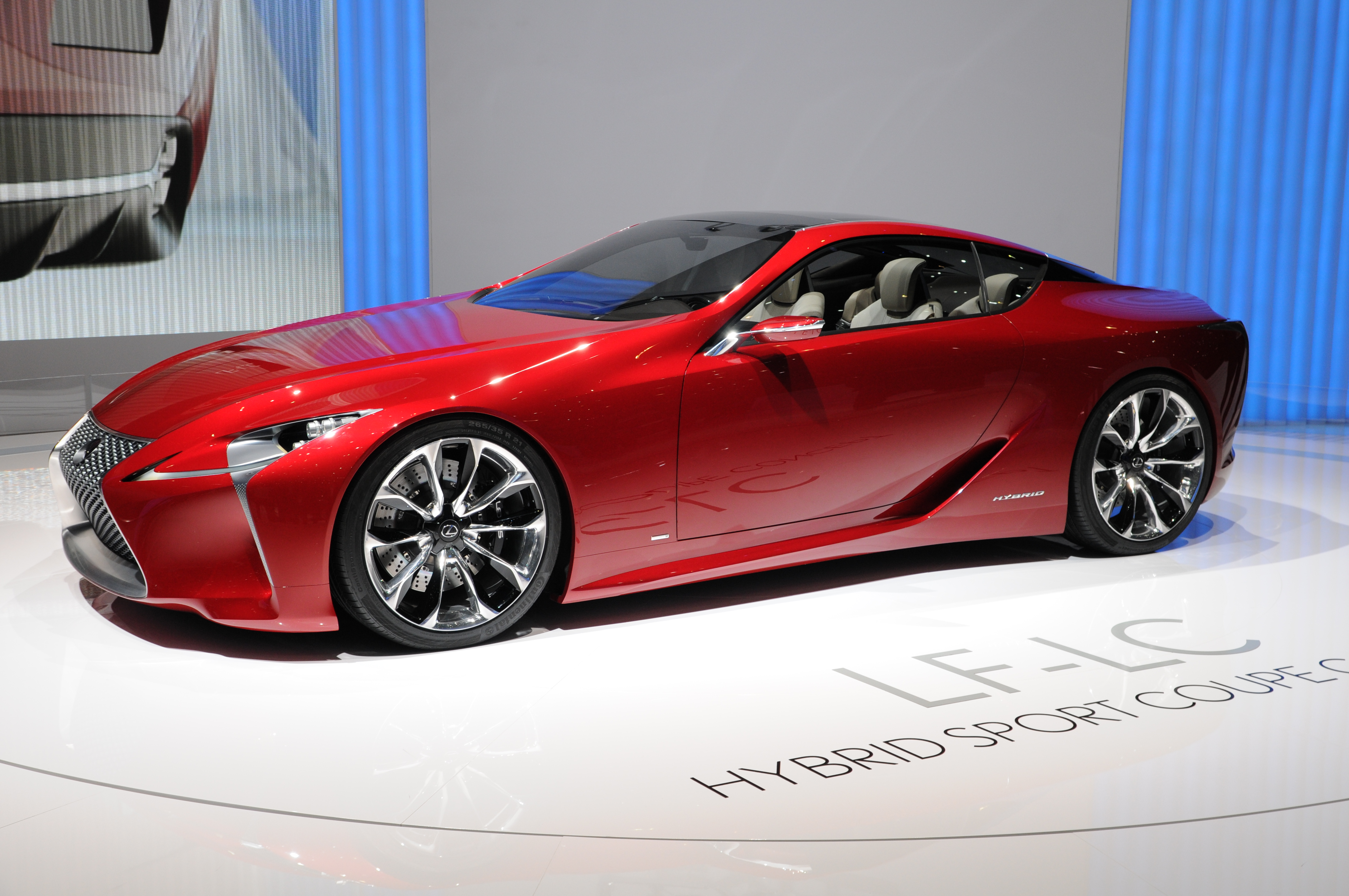
Lexus LF-LC concept at the 2012 Geneva Motor Show.

Designated LF-LC for Lexus Future-Luxury Coupe, the concept two-door vehicle premiered in January 2012 at the North American International Auto Show. The vehicle's exterior and interior styling was created by the Calty Design Research center in Newport Beach, California, which previously developed the exterior styling of the first generation Lexus SC coupe and the fourth generation Lexus GS. The LF-LC features the brand's spindle-shaped grille which debuted several months prior on the fourth generation Lexus GS.

The LF-LC features a front-engine, rear-wheel drive drivetrain layout, which incorporates a next-generation Advanced Lexus Hybrid Drive system. The interior features a remote touchscreen control system linked to two liquid crystal display (LCD) screens that measure 12.3 inches (310 mm) in width. Smartphone-size touchscreens are placed on the door armrests for additional controls.

The LF-LC was produced as a design study for a driver-focused vehicle at the direction of the Lexus Center in Japan, and work began on the concept in May 2010. The exterior appearance of the LF-LC was inadvertently leaked by Road & Track magazine several weeks prior to its scheduled auto show debut, a preview of its February 2012 issue with the LF-LC on its cover (under the headline "Stunning! New Lexus Super Coupe") was posted to YouTube.

During the North American International Auto Show, Mark Templin; the vice president and general manager of Toyota's Lexus Division responded to a reporter "Would you like to see (the LF-LC) to be the next generation SC?. In a report from Autocars, Karl Schlicht, head of Lexus product planning, reportedly gave the LF-LC concept vehicle a 50/50 chance at making production in the future According to a report from Automotive News, the Lexus LF-LC concept is now headed for the showroom in the near future and could be production ready within three years. It is unclear if the new coupe will wear the SC nameplate or continued on with its concept name LC. However, this new coupe would filled the gap of the discontinued SC430 and finally give Lexus a much needed Nissan GT-R or Acura NSX rival. It has now officially confirmed the LF-LC for production. Lexus International executive vice-president Kazuo Ohara says the LF-LC coupe would be an all-new car, possibly built from a newly developed set of underpinnings, that would take around four years to make it to production.

A series production model inspired by the 2012 LF-LC Concept is being developed under the Toyota 950A development program. Introduced at the 2016 North American International Auto Show, it went on sale as the LC500 in the second quarter of 2017, based on the new Toyota GA-L modular rear-wheel drive platform and the fifth generation LS flagship.

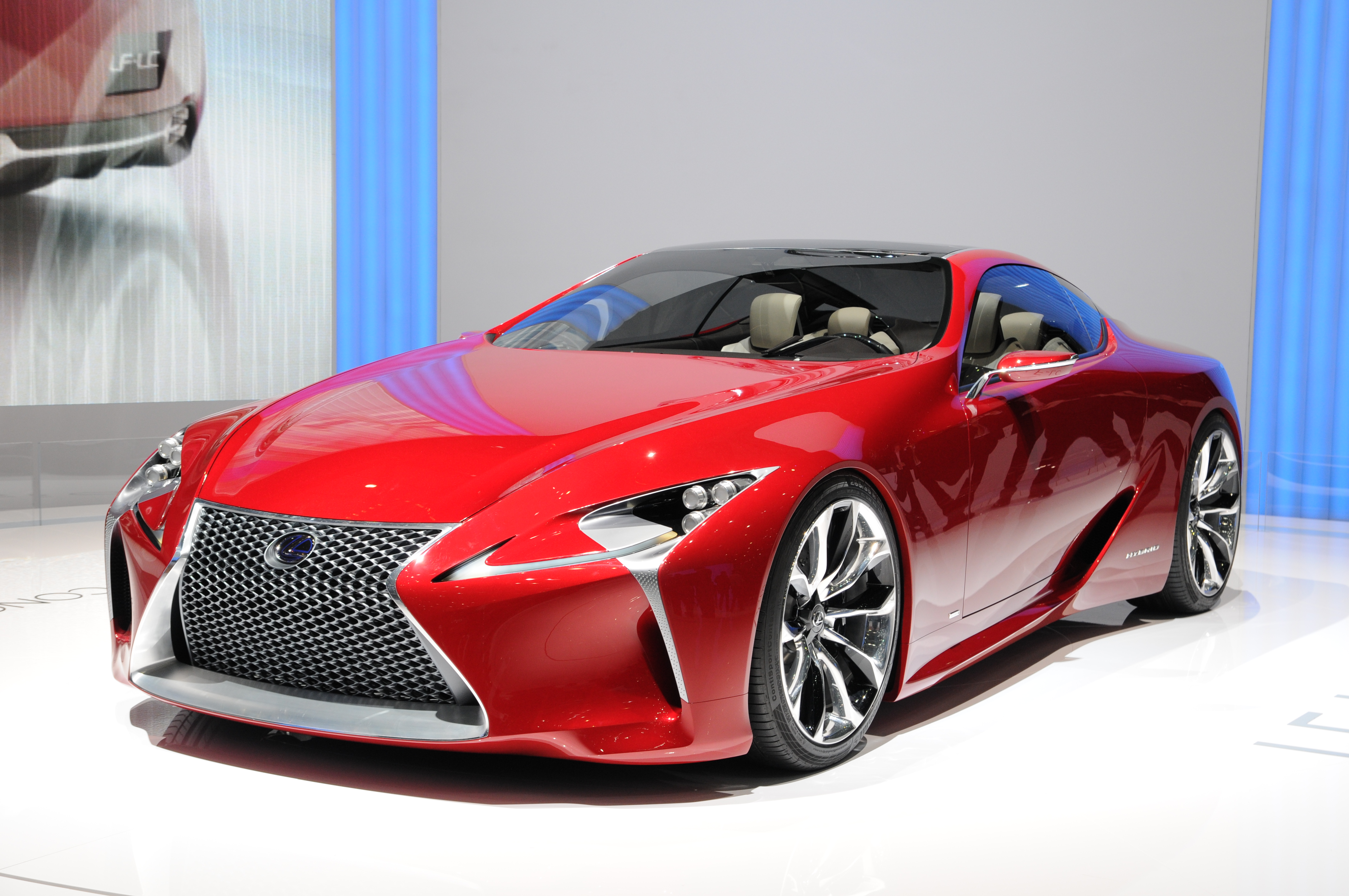
LF-LC with spindle grille.

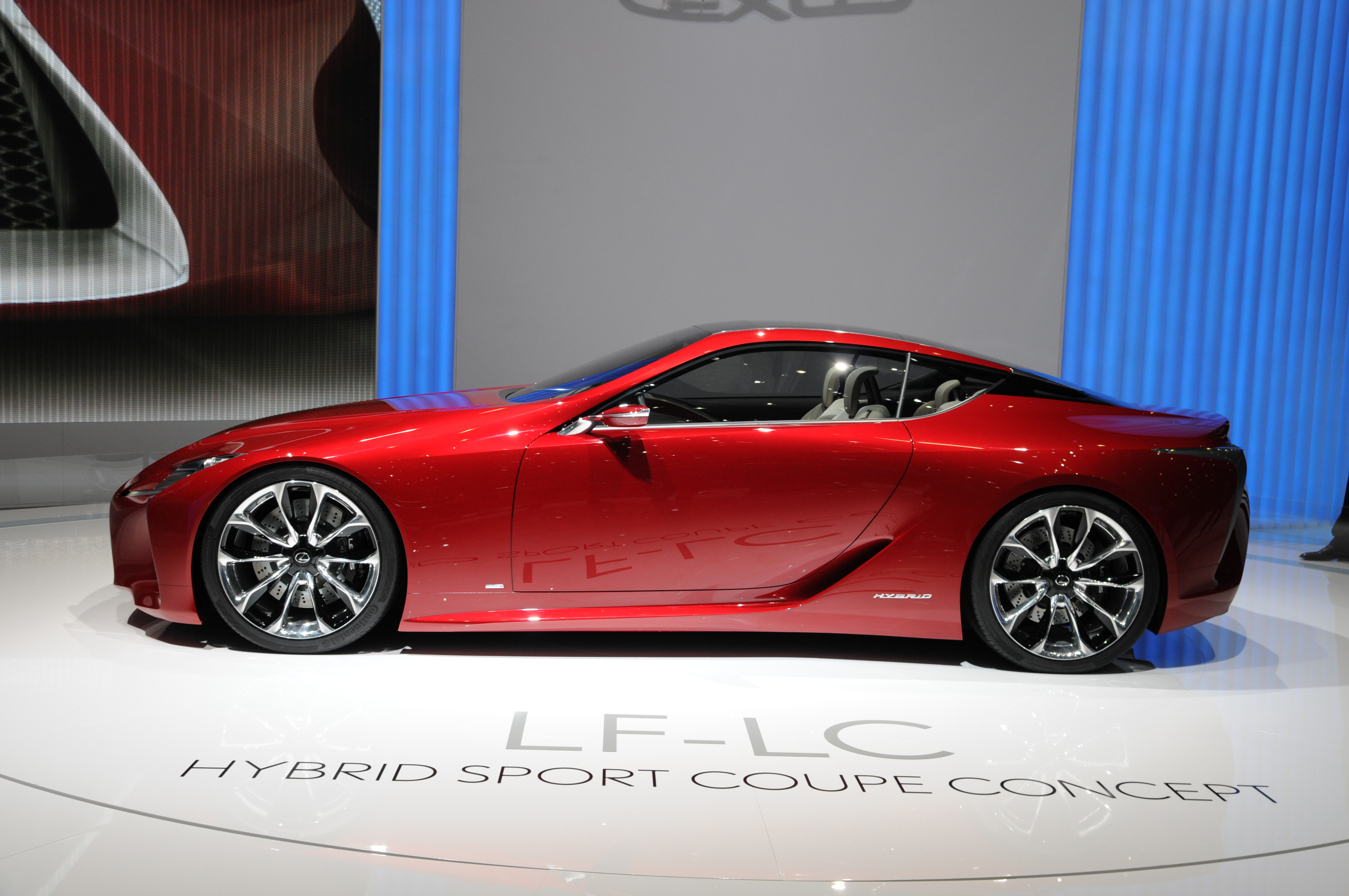
Side of the LF-LC.

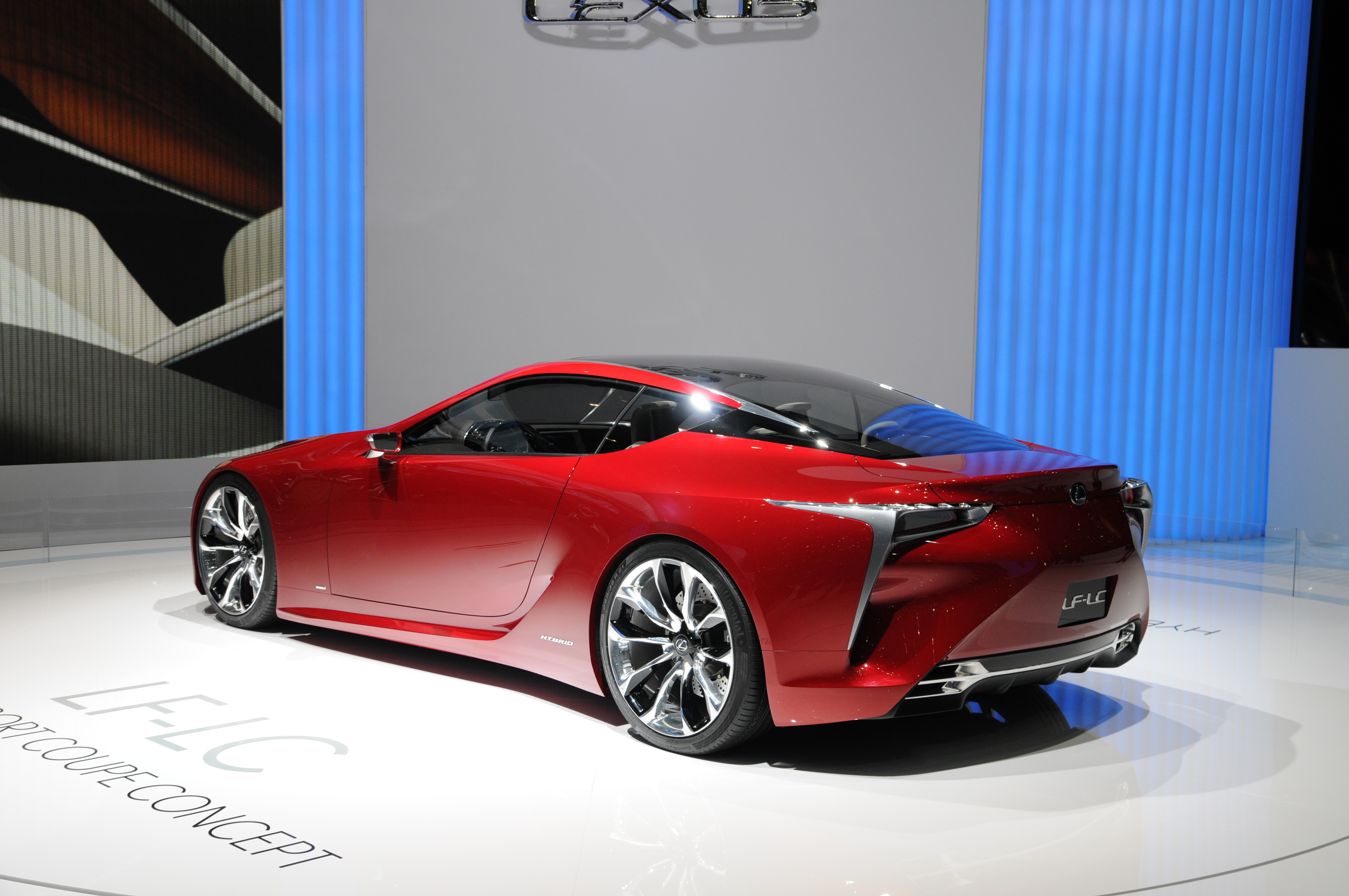
Rear of the LF-LC.

== LF-LC Blue ==
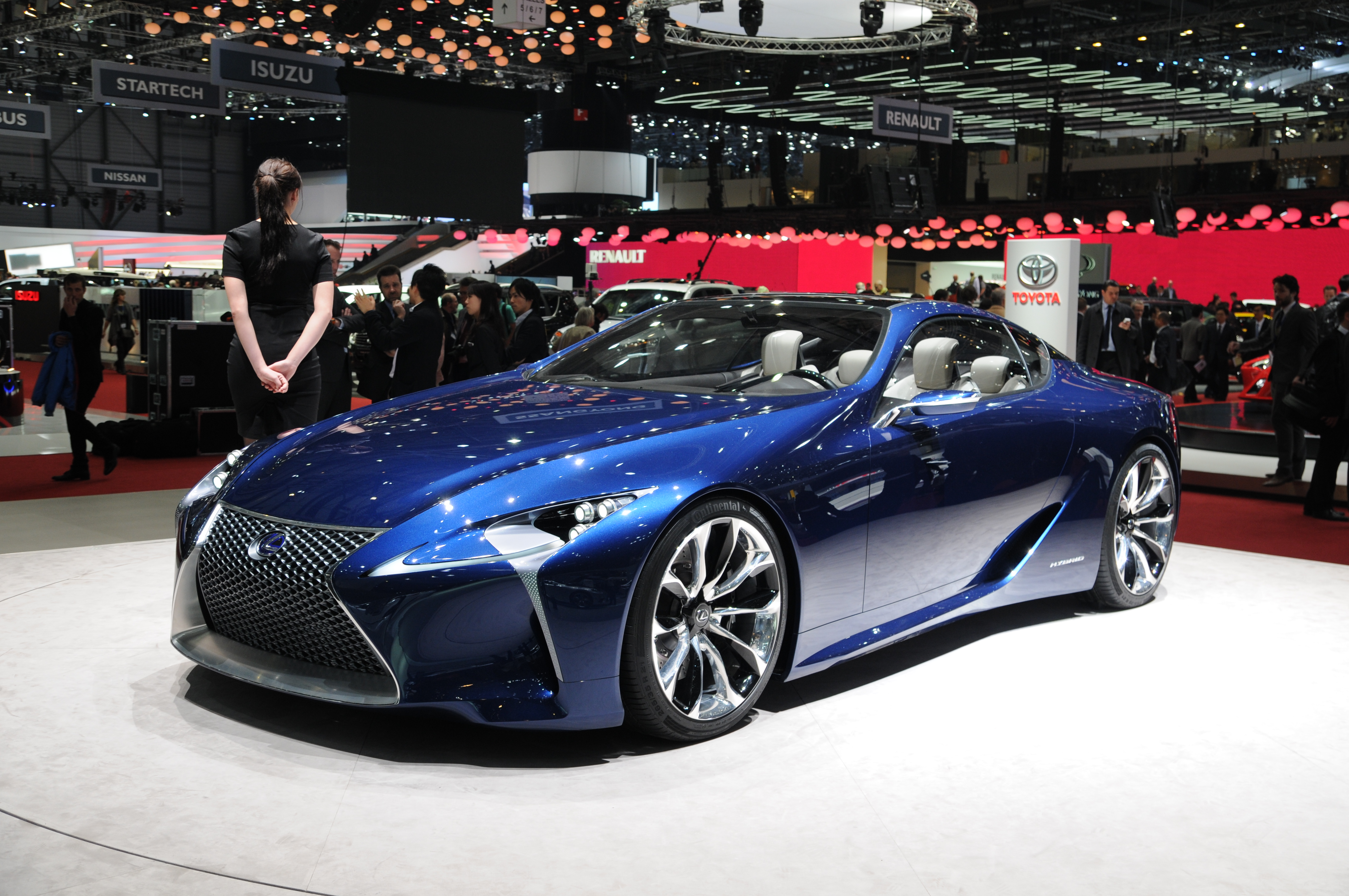
Lexus LF-LC Blue

The LF-LC Blue is a rear-wheel drive concept coupe based on the LF-LC, with Opal Blue body colour, Atkinson cycle combustion engine, battery pack, white and brown interior. The vehicle was unveiled at the 2012 Australian International Motor Show, and later at the 2012 LA Auto Show.

== LF-LC GT "Vision Gran Turismo" ==
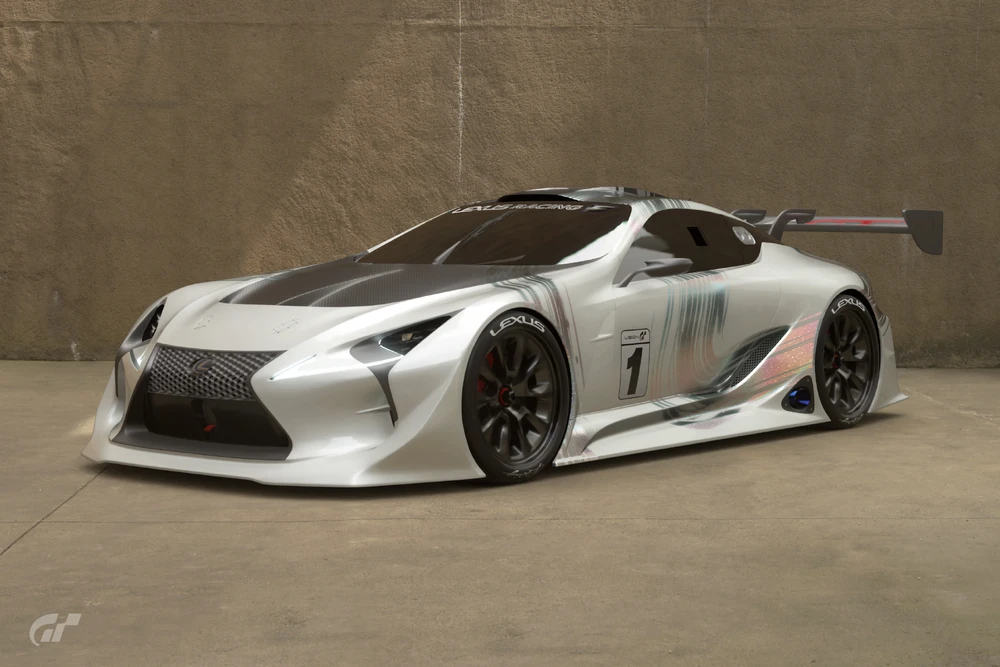
In-game screenshot of the Lexus LF-LC GT "Vision Gran Turismo".

The LF-LC GT "Vision Gran Turismo" is a fictional rear-wheel drive concept coupe based on the LF-LC concept, and is featured in Gran Turismo 6, Gran Turismo Sport, and Gran Turismo 7.

== LF-NX ==
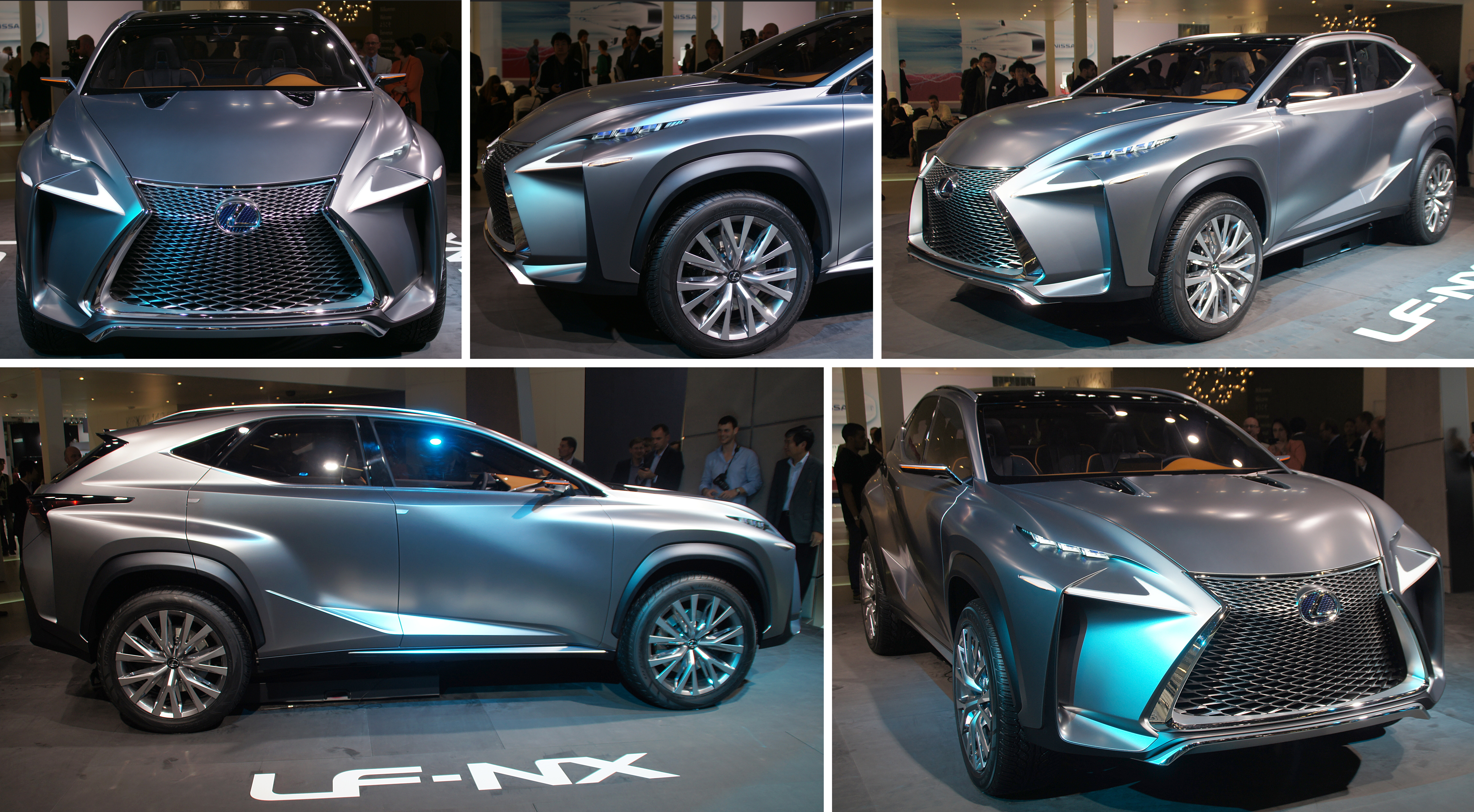
Lexus LF-NX at Frankfurt Motor Show, 2013

Introduced at the September 2013 Frankfurt Motor Show as a compact crossover. It previewed the production Lexus NX (AZ10) later unveiled in April 2014 at the Beijing Auto Show.

== LF-S ==
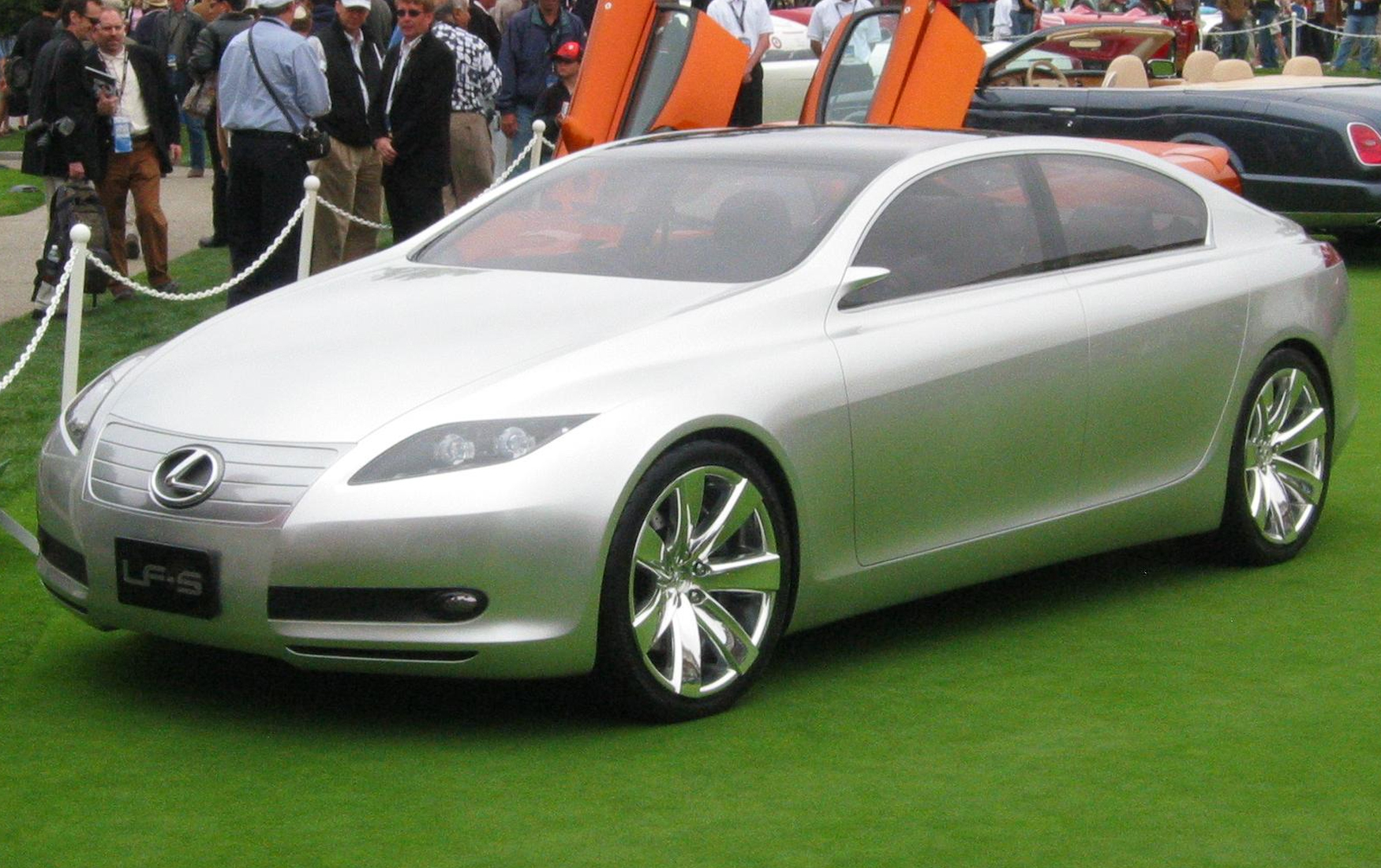
The Lexus LF-S concept at the August 2005 Pebble Beach Concours d'Elegance.

The LF-S is a concept luxury sedan which Lexus unveiled in October 2003 at the Tokyo Motor Show, signalling its intentions to launch Lexus in its home country. The designation stands for Lexus Future-Sedan. Unique features of the LF-S concept included side-mounted cameras instead of mirrors, an air stream style windshield cleansing system, transparent panoramic roof with security illumination, and keyless entry. Design cues from the LF-S, particularly the slingshot cabin, sleek profile, and rear deck lid, appeared in the third generation Lexus GS production sedan. The vehicle was designed to seat 5 passengers.

The LF-S was powered by a high-output hybrid V8 system with all-wheel drive, marking the conceptual debut of a Lexus vehicle with hybrid technology (the first luxury hybrid, the RX 400h, subsequently premiered in 2005 with a V6 hybrid powertrain, and in 2007 the LS 600h and LS 600h L hybrids debuted with hybrid V8 systems). The LF-S and GS sedans were displayed together at the Los Angeles Auto Show in November 2005, alluding to the design similarities between concept and production model. Overall length was 193.3 in (4,910 mm)., width 74.6 in (1,895 mm)., and height 53.0 in (1,346 mm).

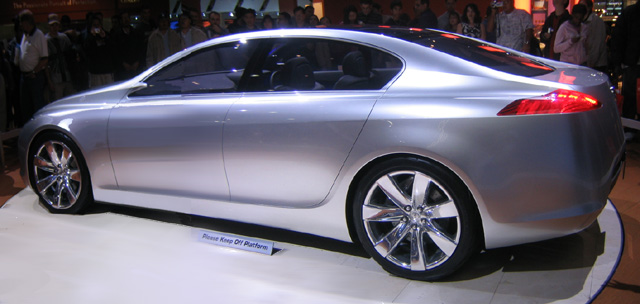
LF-S at the Los Angeles Auto show.

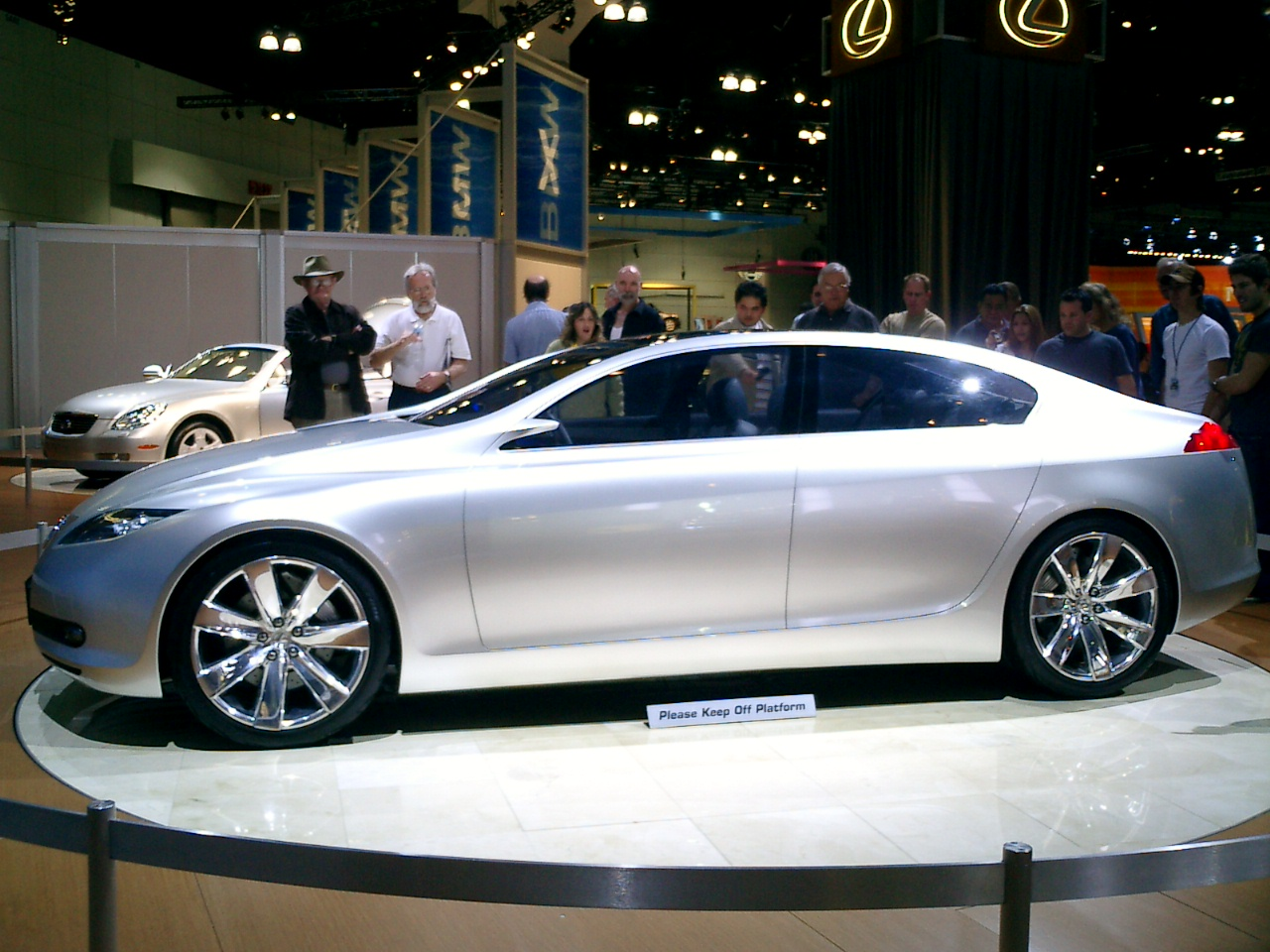
LF-S side profile view.

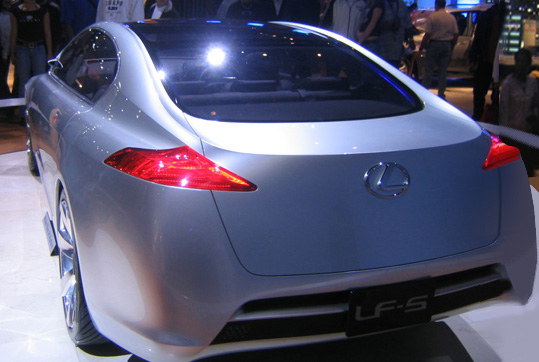
LF-S rear fascia.

== LF-SA ==
The LF-SA is a subcompact crossover based on the Vitz/Yaris platform showcased at the 2015 Geneva Motor Show. The exterior designer of this concept car is Laurent Bouzigue and the interior designer is Jaromir Cech.

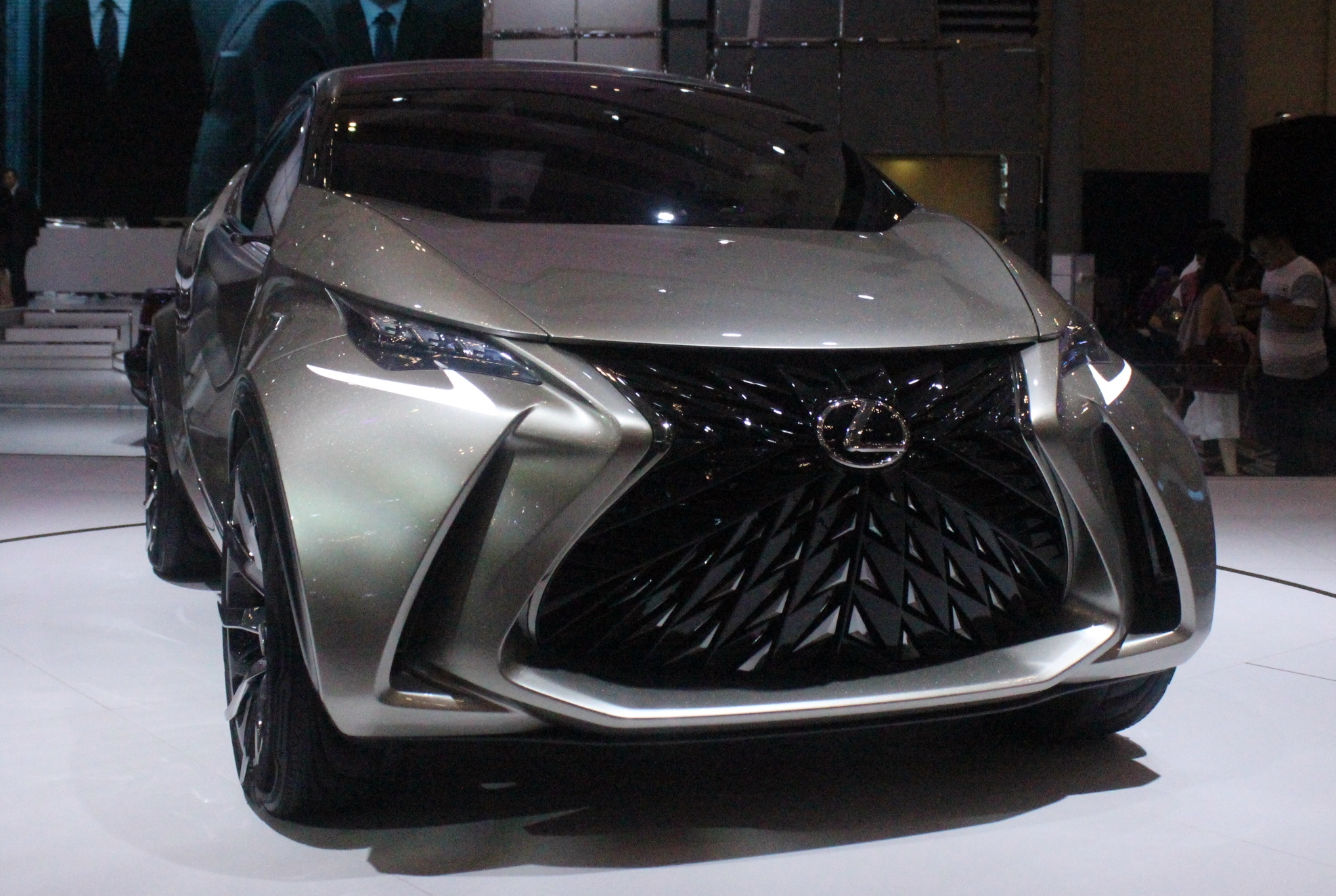
Front view

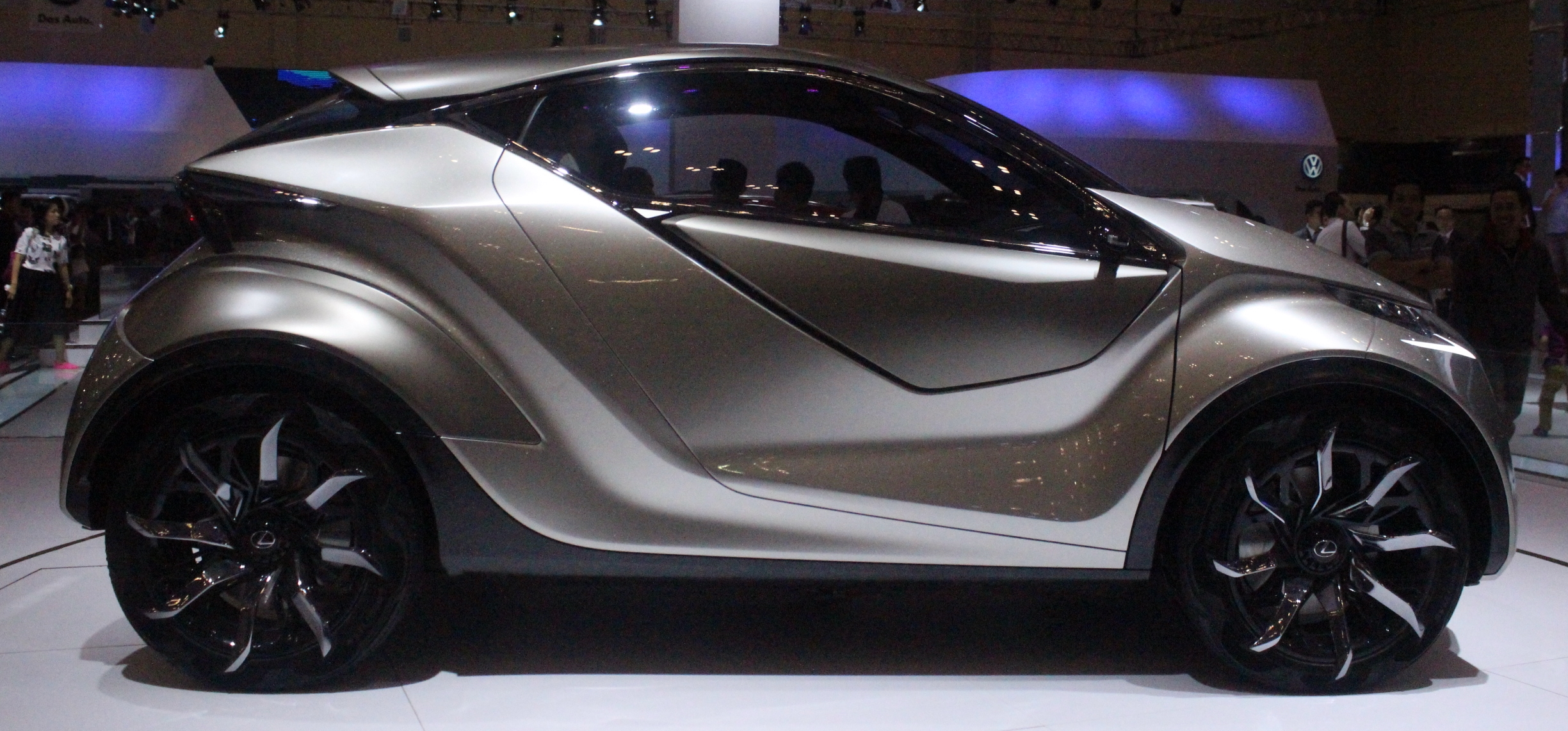
Side view

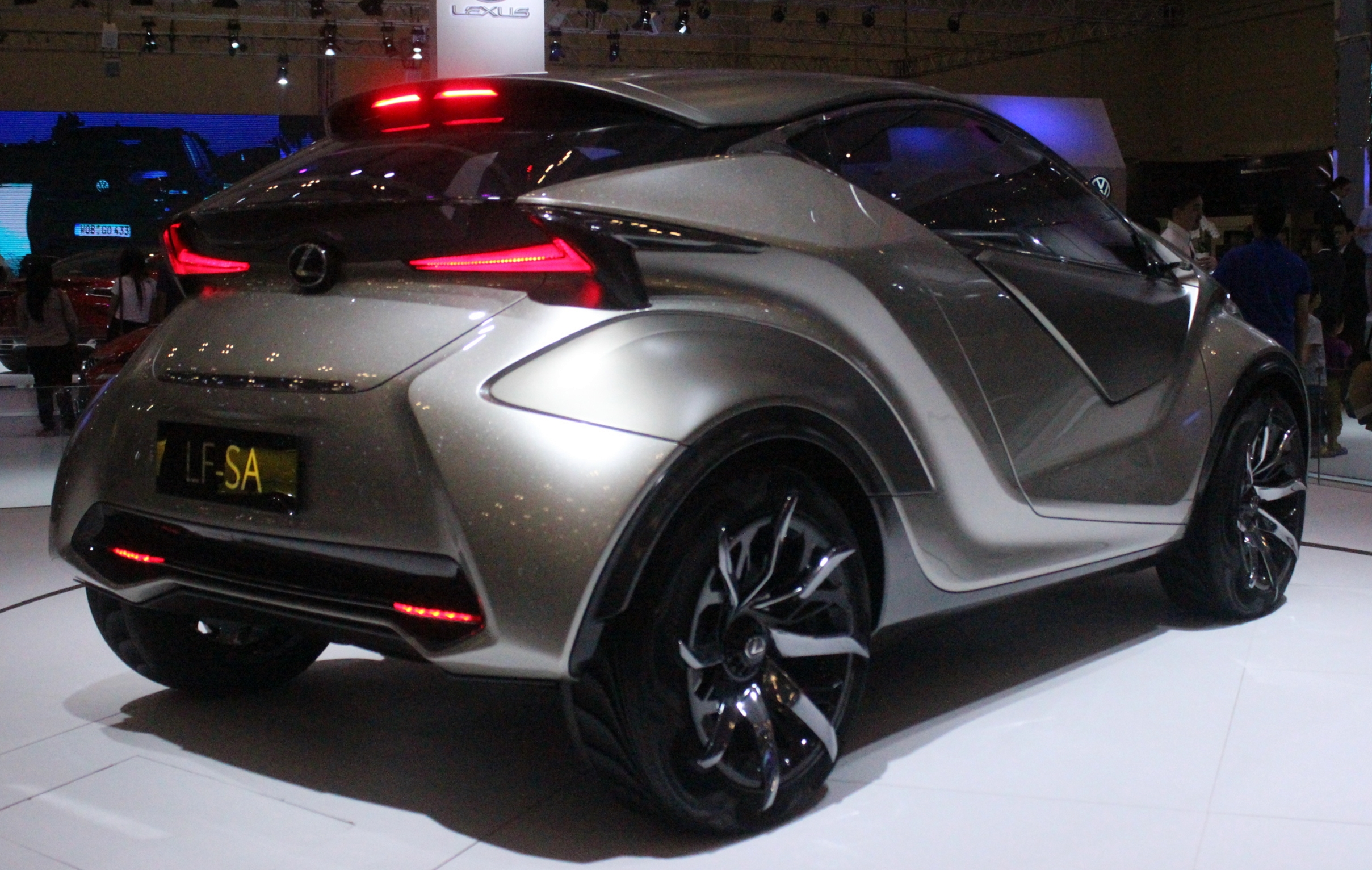
Rear view

== LF-Sh ==
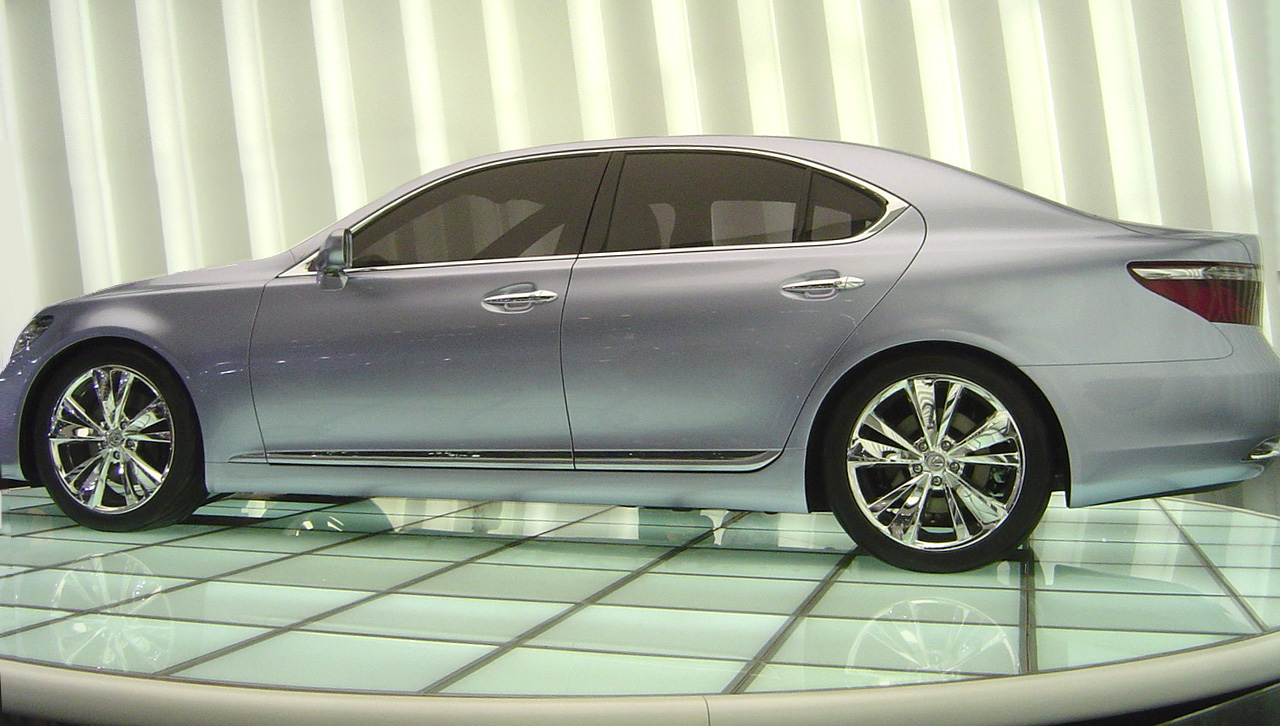
Lexus LF-Sh hybrid concept at the 2005 Tokyo Motor Show

Production concept luxury sedan. The LF-Sh was developed to preview the fourth generation Lexus LS. The LF-Sh featured LED headlamps, hybrid all-wheel drive, and exhaust vents integrated into the rear bumper. The designation refers to Lexus Future-Sedan hybrid. Although the LF-Sh debuted before the LS 460 and shared identical exterior dimensions as the standard wheelbase version of the fourth generation LS sedan, it was a subsequent development, thus it did not particularly influence the production model.

Multiple details on the LF-Sh as a result, differed from the production model. Among them, the integrated exhaust vents were instead a seamless one-piece design versus a chrome-plated version. The LED headlamps did not appear on the standard production LS 460, but did later debut on the hybrid ultra-luxury LS 600h / LS 600h L. The long wheelbase model LS 460 L is a lengthened version of the LF-Sh/LS 460 standard wheelbase design.

The LF-Sh concept premiered at the Tokyo Motor Show in late 2005, following the debut of Lexus in the home market of Japan, and predating the January 2006 debut of the LS 460 North America. The LF-Sh concept was not fitted with an interior, allowing the interior reveal of the LS 460 to occur at the North American International Auto Show in 2006.

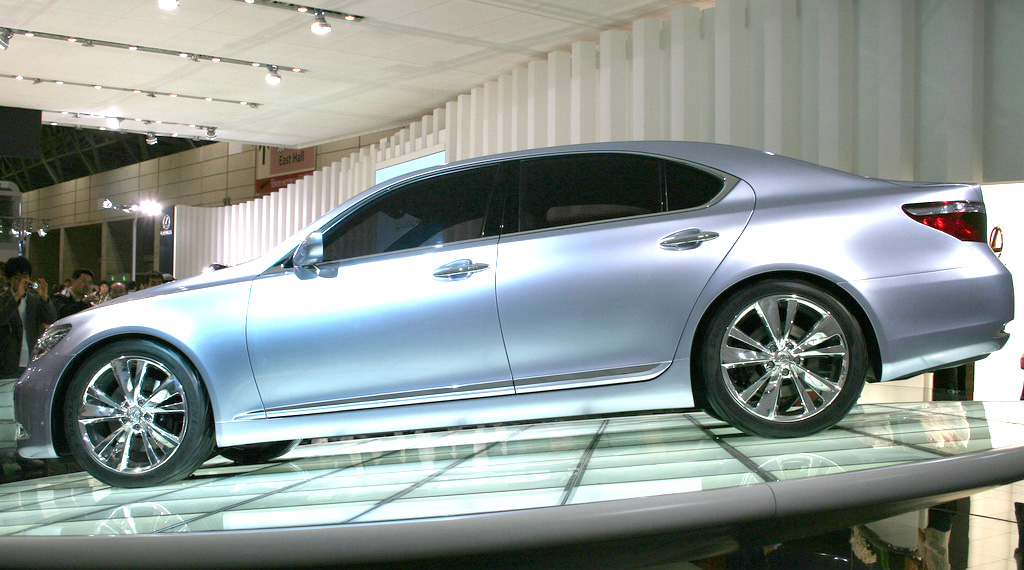
Side profile.

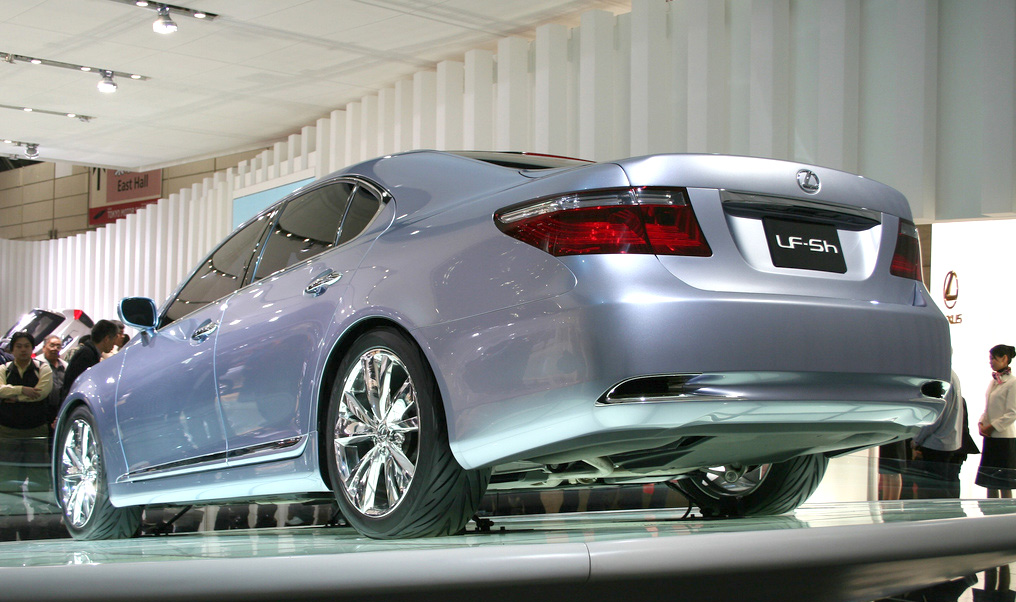
Integrated exhaust vents.

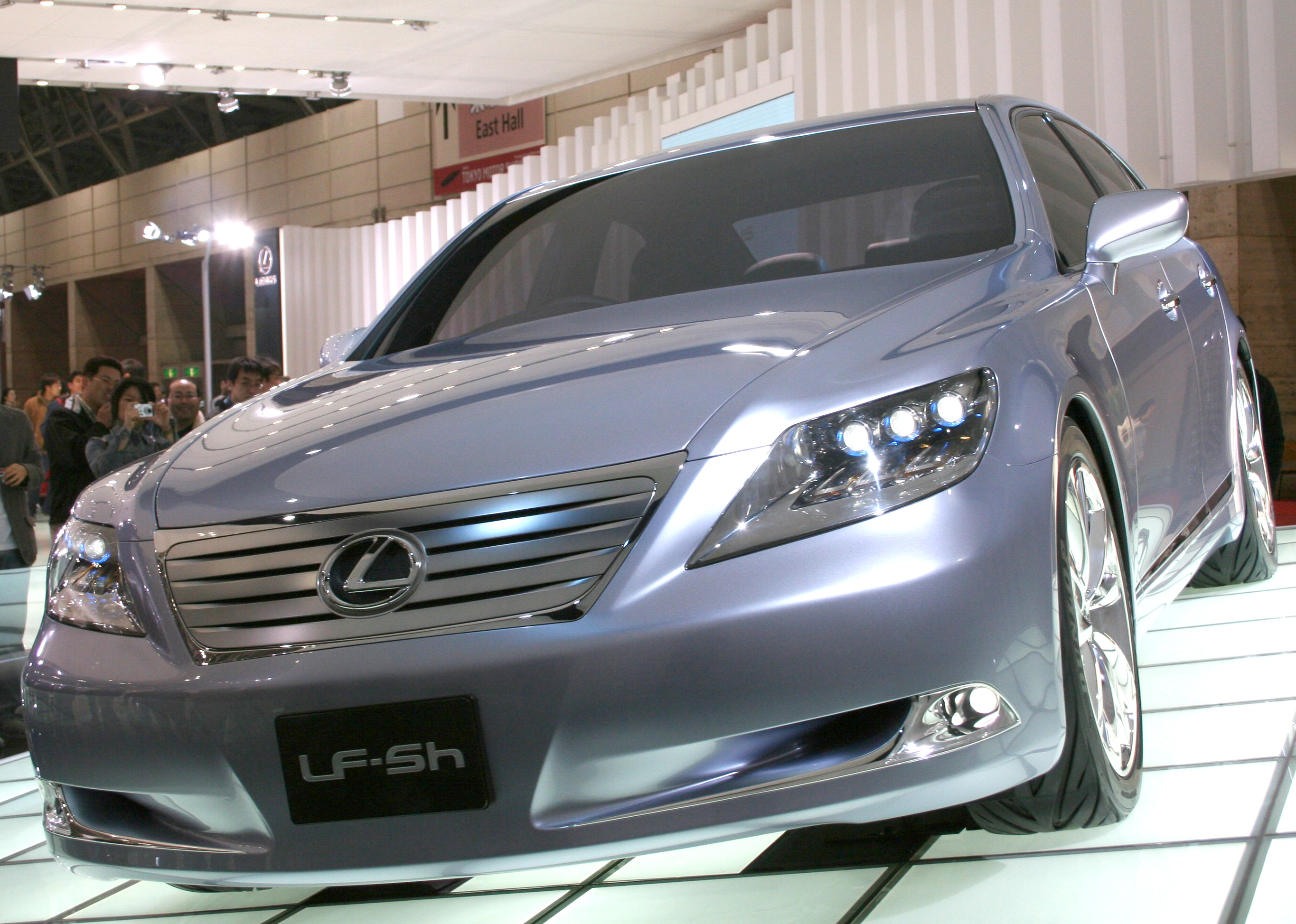
At the '05 Tokyo Motor Show.

== LF-X ==
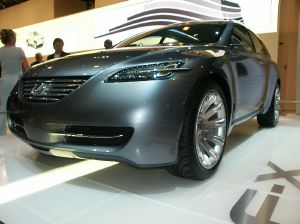
The Lexus LF-X crossover concept

Concept crossover vehicle. The LF-X designation stands for Lexus Future-Crossover(X). This vehicle was the first to appear in the LF Series, and was initially revealed using the prior Lexus concept nomenclature as the HP-X. The LF-X design fits between the RX crossover and the GX large SUV. If produced (possibly under the VX or JX designation), the LF-X would offer three rows of seating, compared to the RX's two rows. The LF-X was produced using the GS 430 platform, and equipped with a 300-horsepower V8 engine. The instrument panel was designed to be customizable for size, position, and color. Rear seat entertainment screens could be deployed from the center console. Overall length was 4,935 mm (194.3 in), width 1,984 mm (78.1 in), and height 1,646 mm (64.8 in), with wheelbase at 2,959 mm (116.5 in).

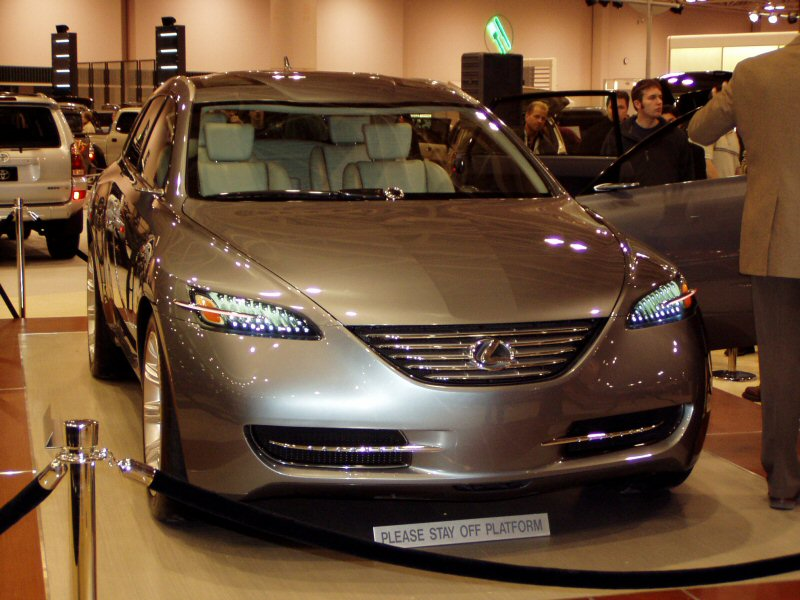
Forward view of LF-X concept

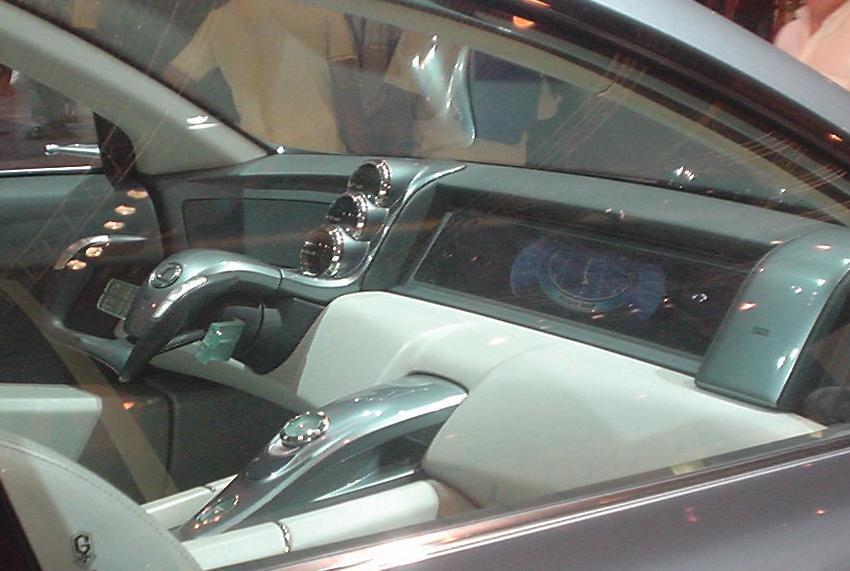
LF-X dashboard

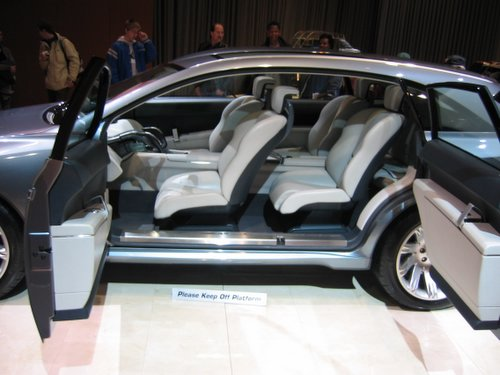
LF-X side profile, interior

== LF-Xh ==
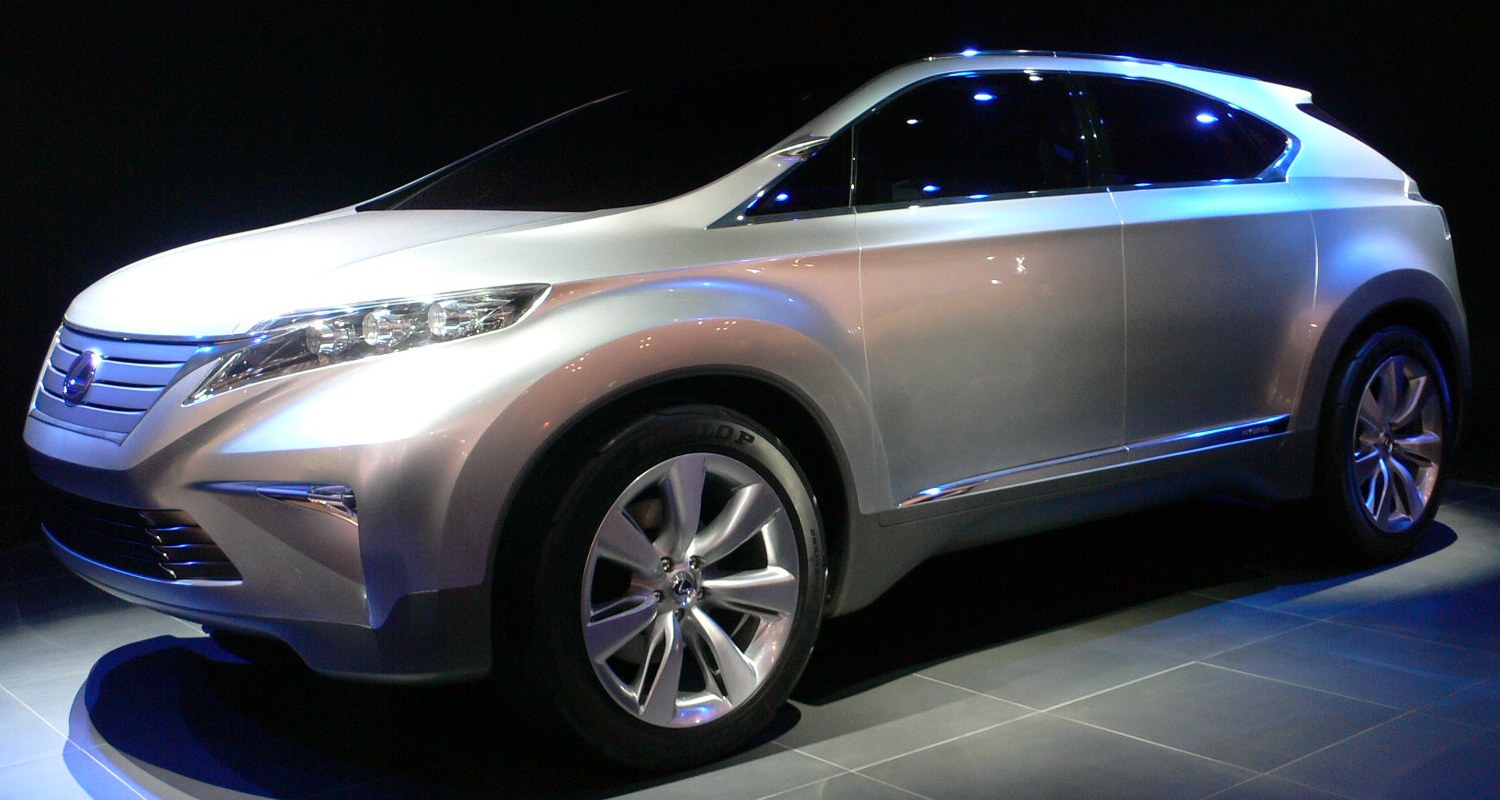
The Lexus LF-Xh at the 2007 Tokyo Motor Show.

The Lexus LF-Xh is a concept crossover hybrid vehicle. The LF-Xh designation stands for Lexus Future-Crossover(X) hybrid. This vehicle was first shown in October 2007 at the Tokyo Motor Show and appeared also at the October 2008 Paris Motor Show. The LF-Xh featured a V6 engine with electric motors, LED headlights and taillights, and a concept interior.

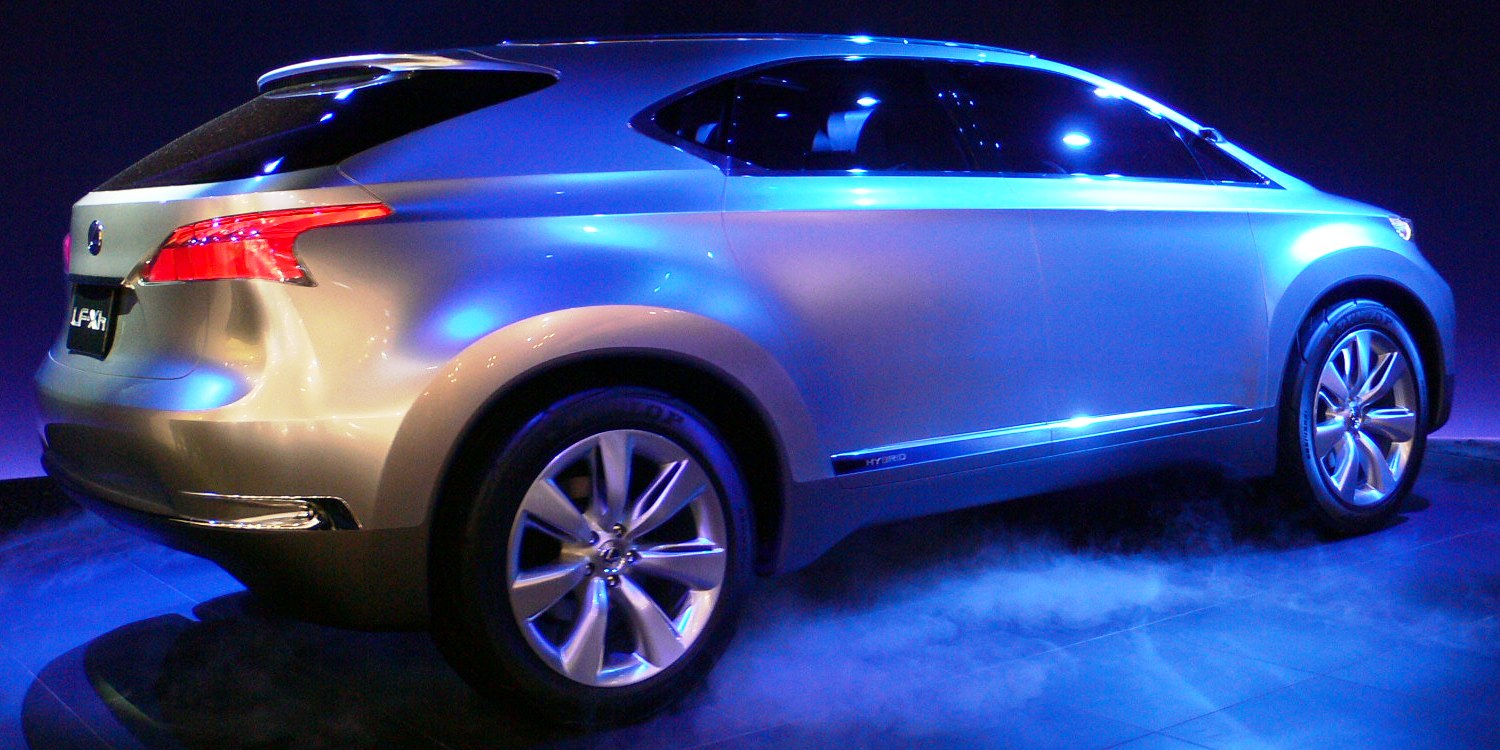
LF-Xh angle view.

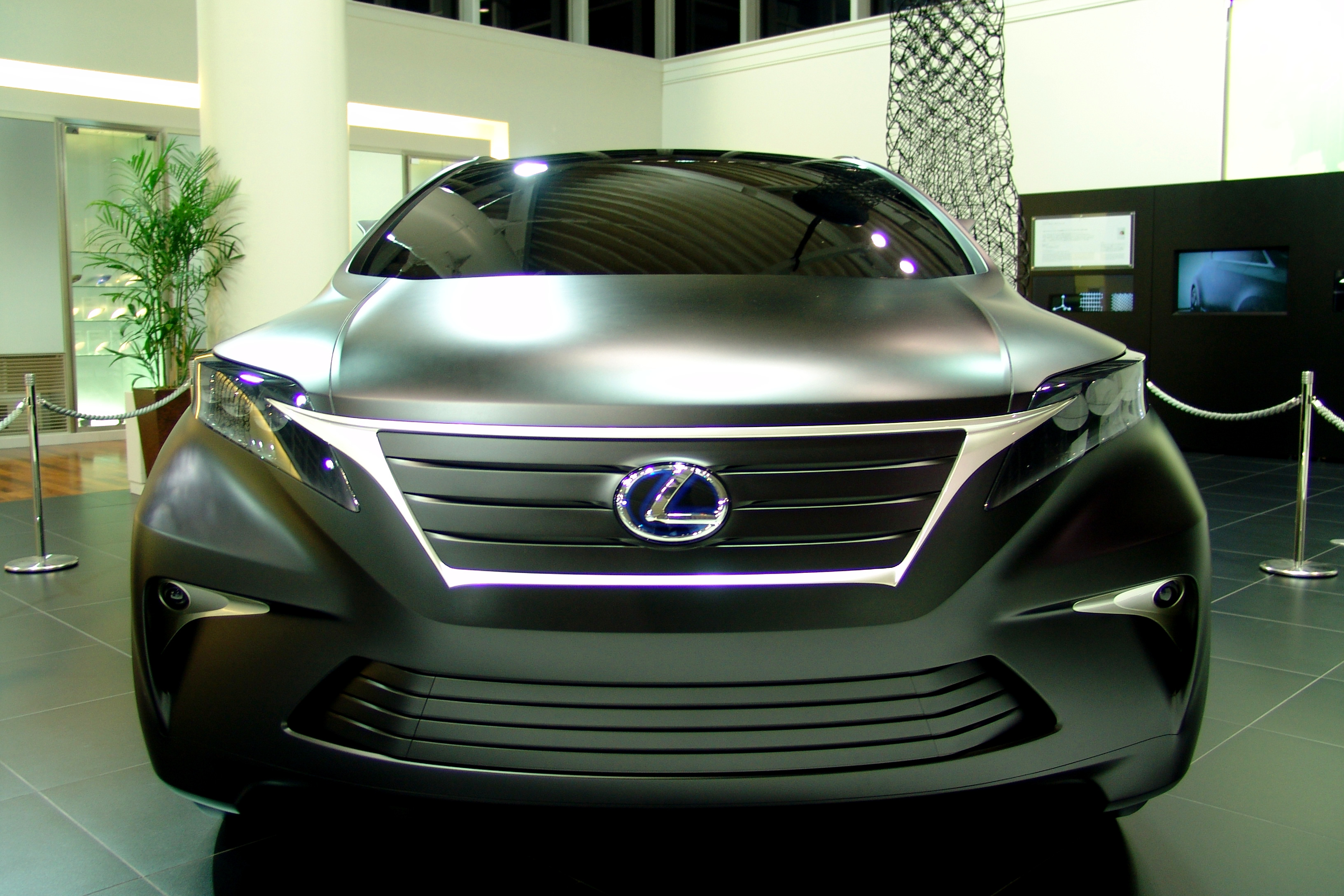
Front view.

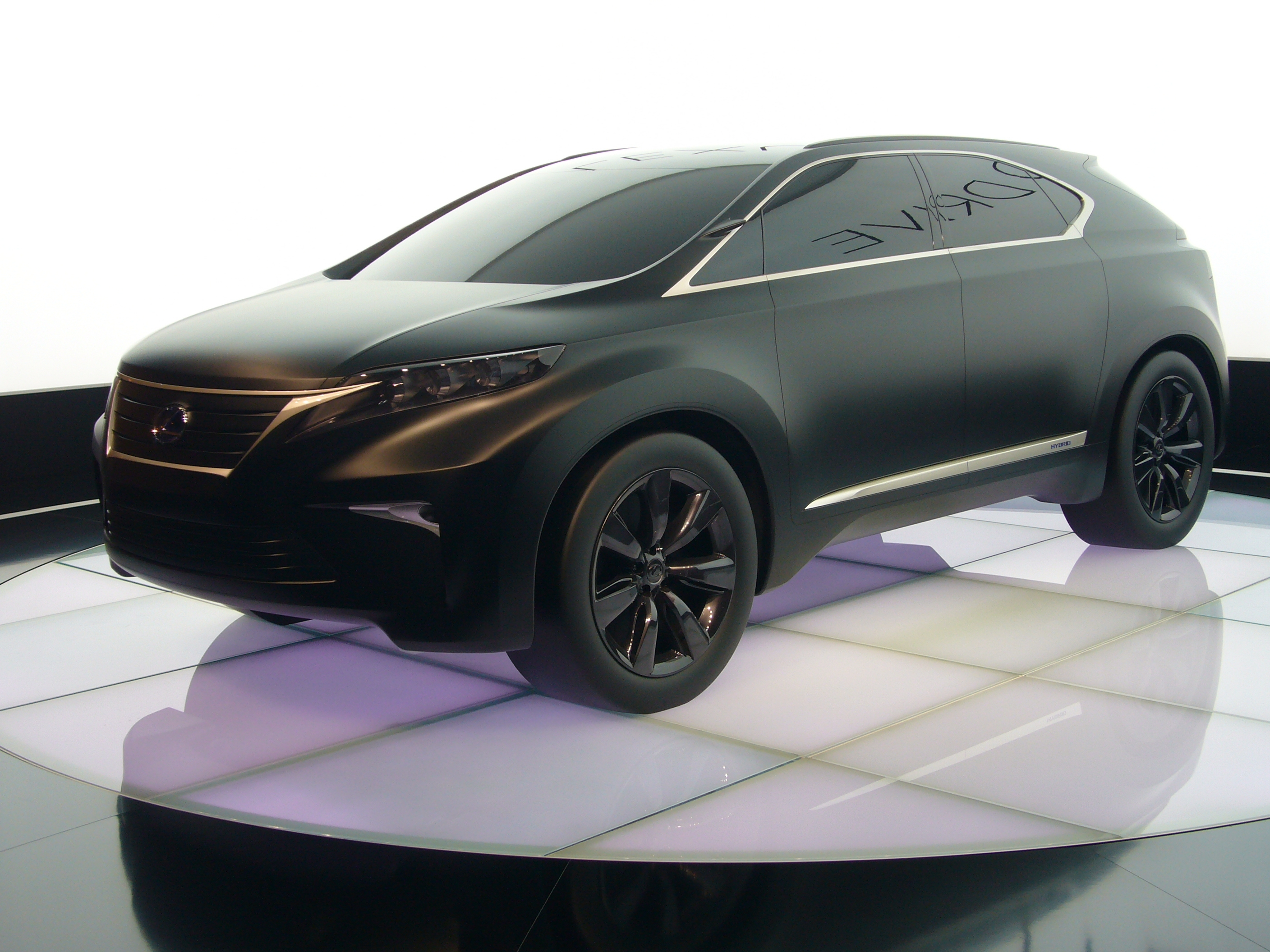
In matte black.

== LF-UX ==
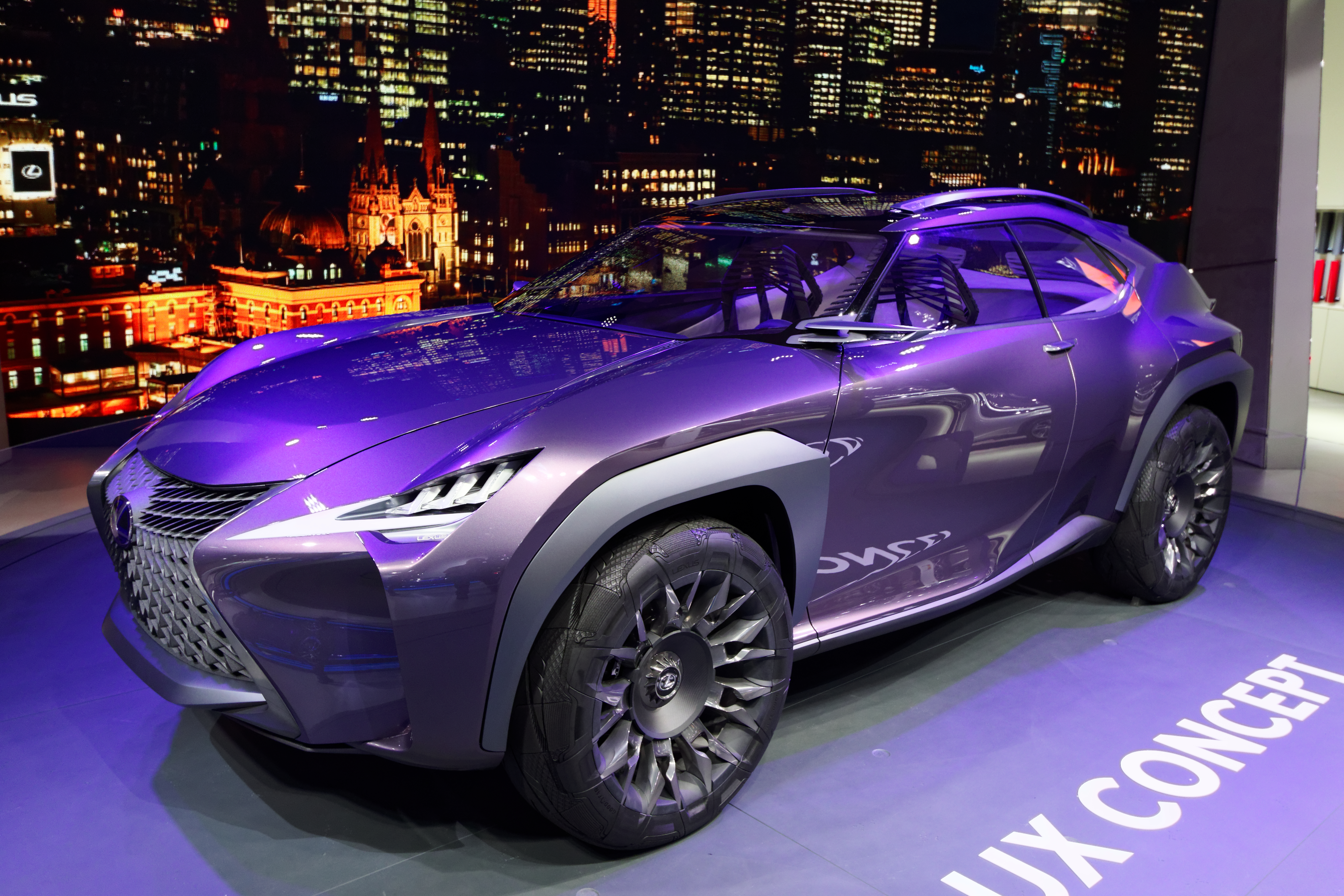
Lexus LF-UX

The Lexus LF-UX was revealed at the 2016 Paris Motor Show as a preview for a new subcompact SUV called UX. It was designed at Toyota ED2 design studio by Stephan Rasmussen (exterior) and Alexandre Gommier (interior).

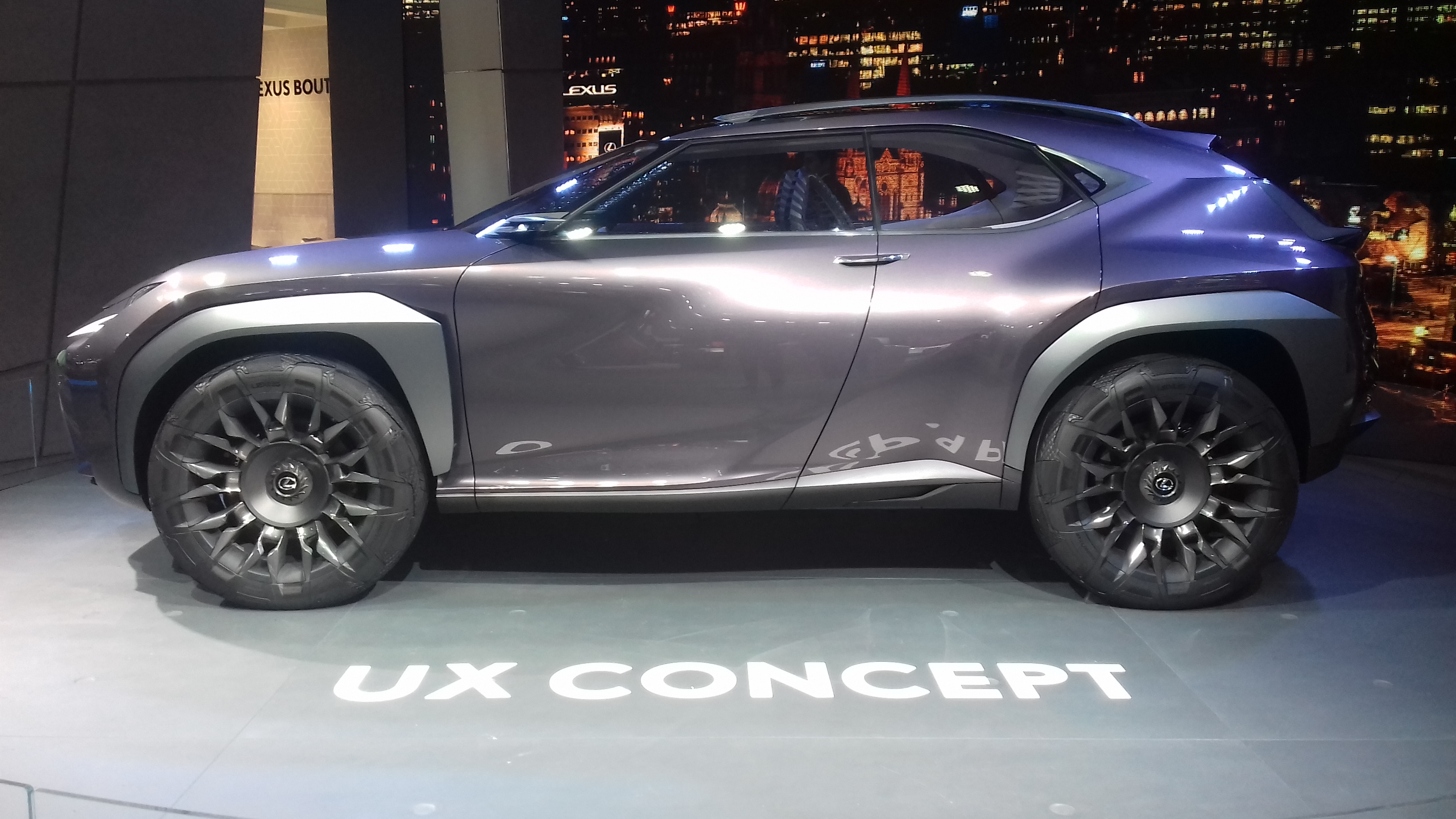

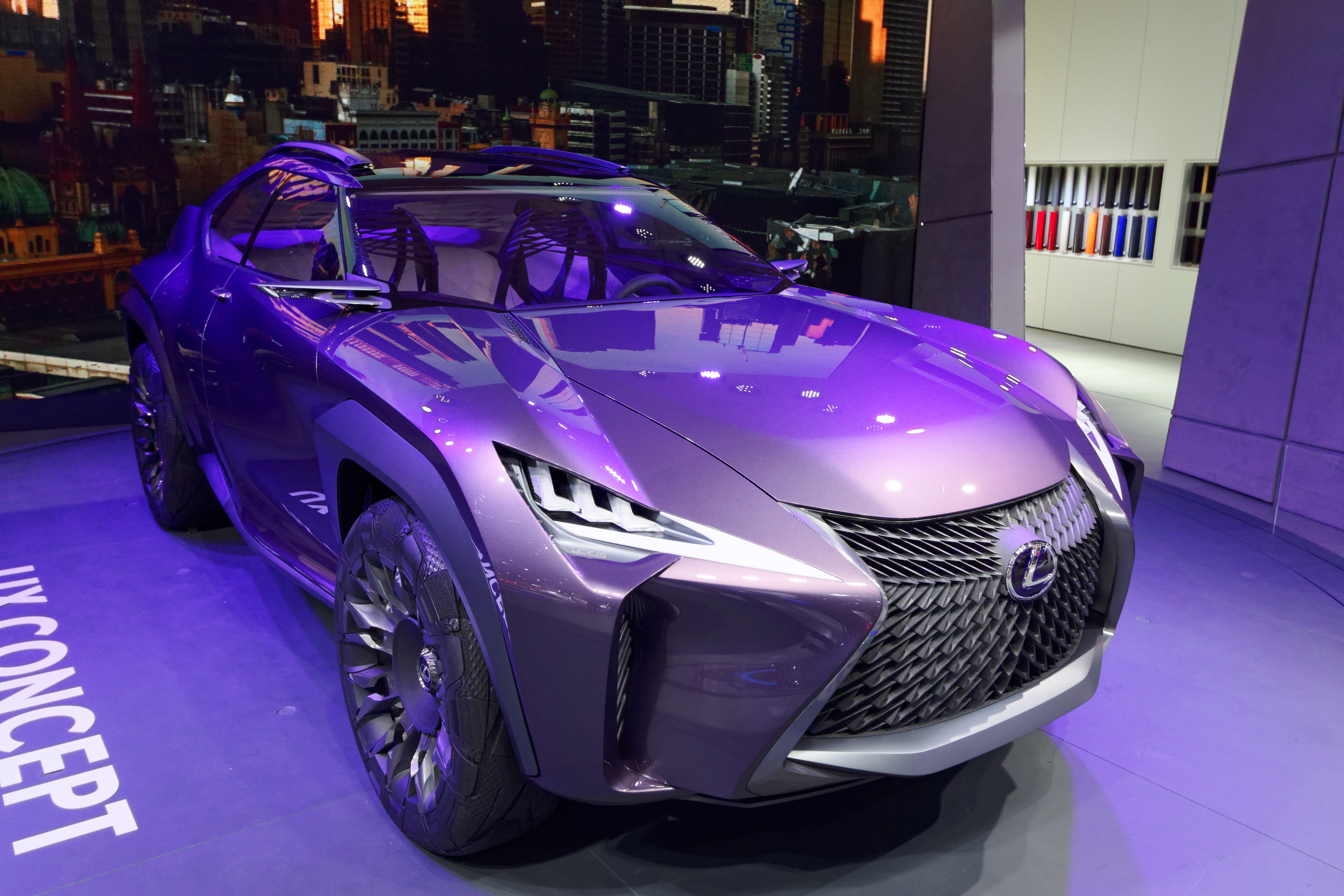

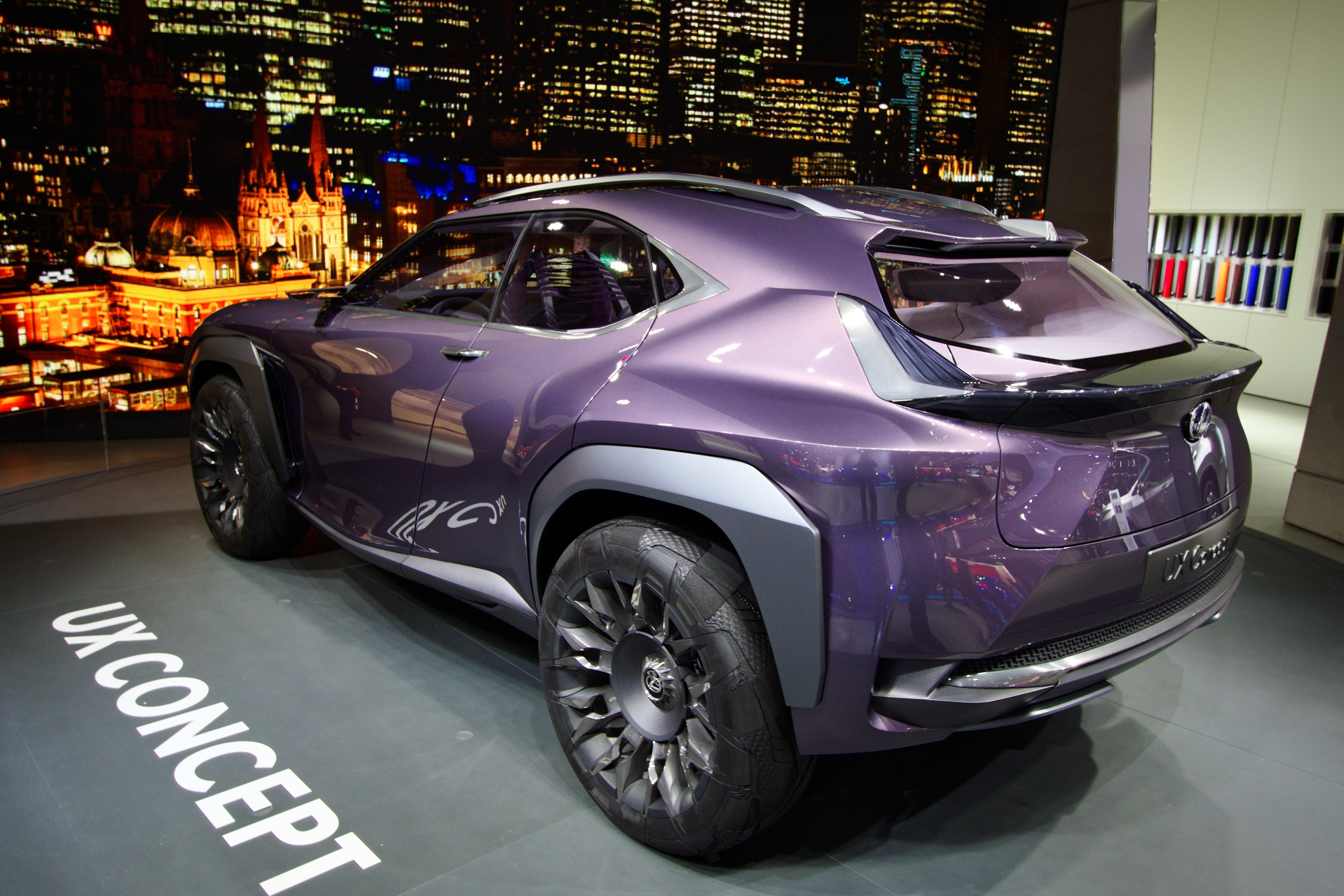

== LF-30 ==
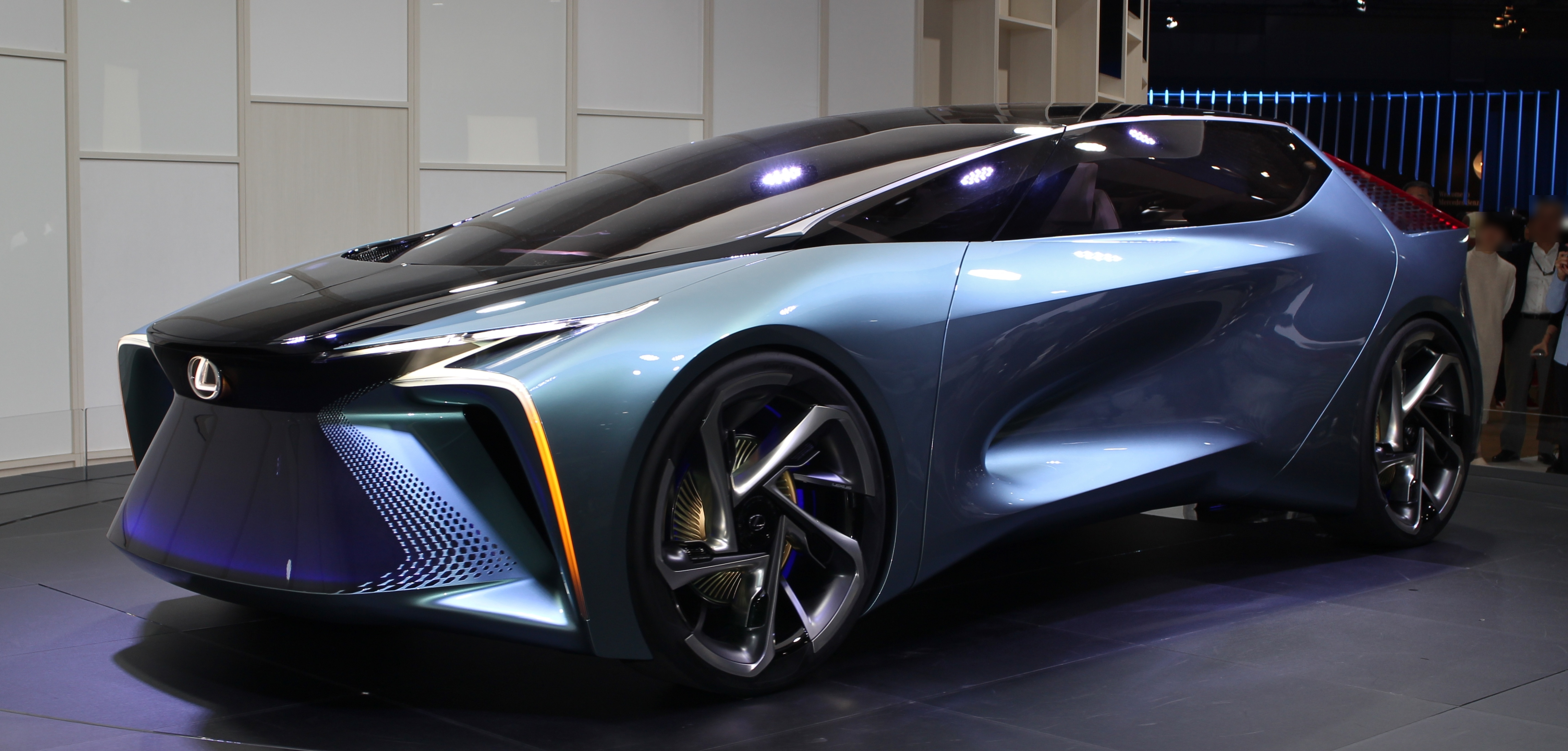
Lexus LF-30

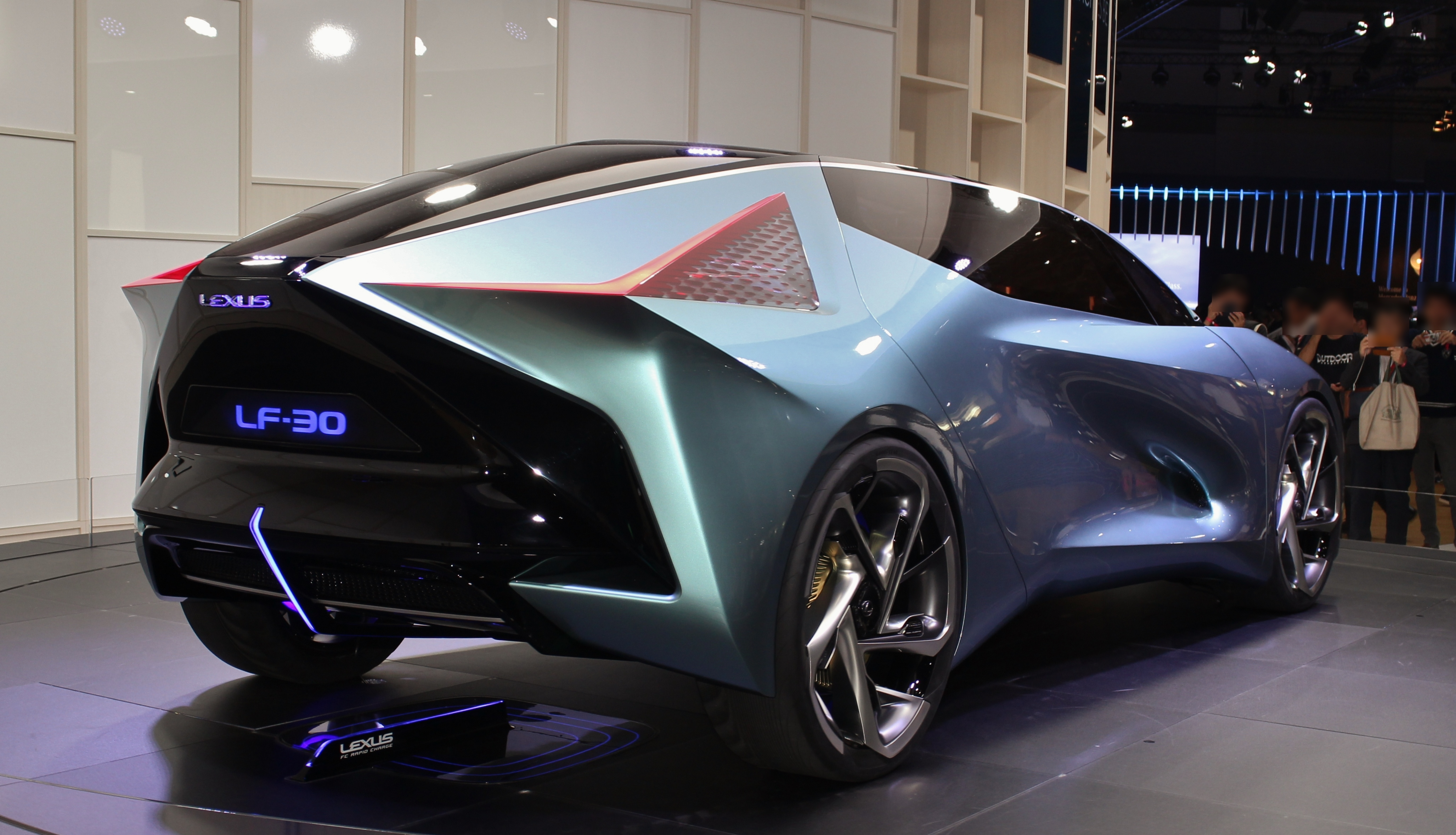
Lexus LF-30 rear view

The LF-30 is an electric concept car which premiered at the 2019 Tokyo Motor Show. It features innovative tech such as four in-wheel electric motors and wireless charging.

== LF-1 Limitless ==
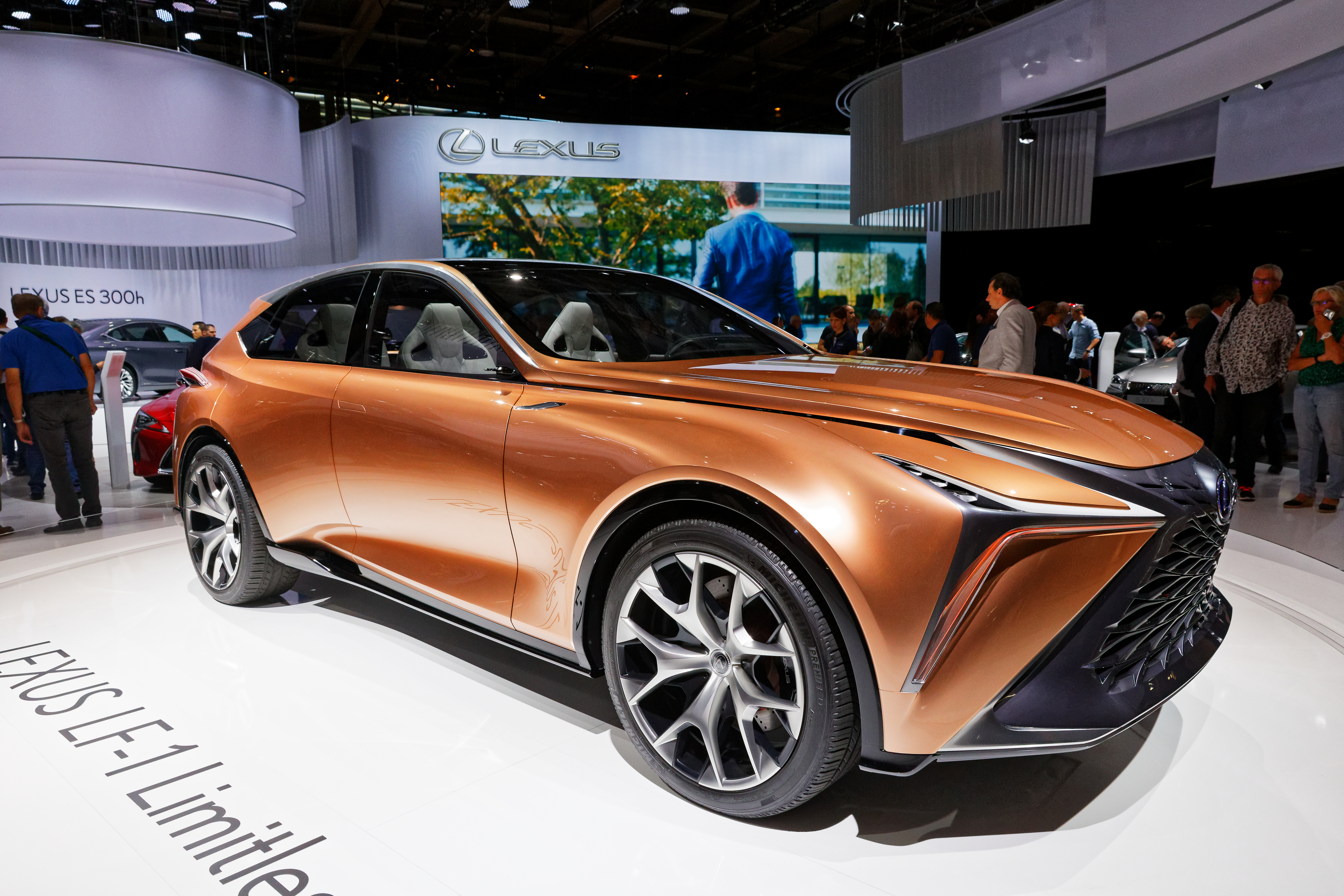
Lexus LF-1 Limitless

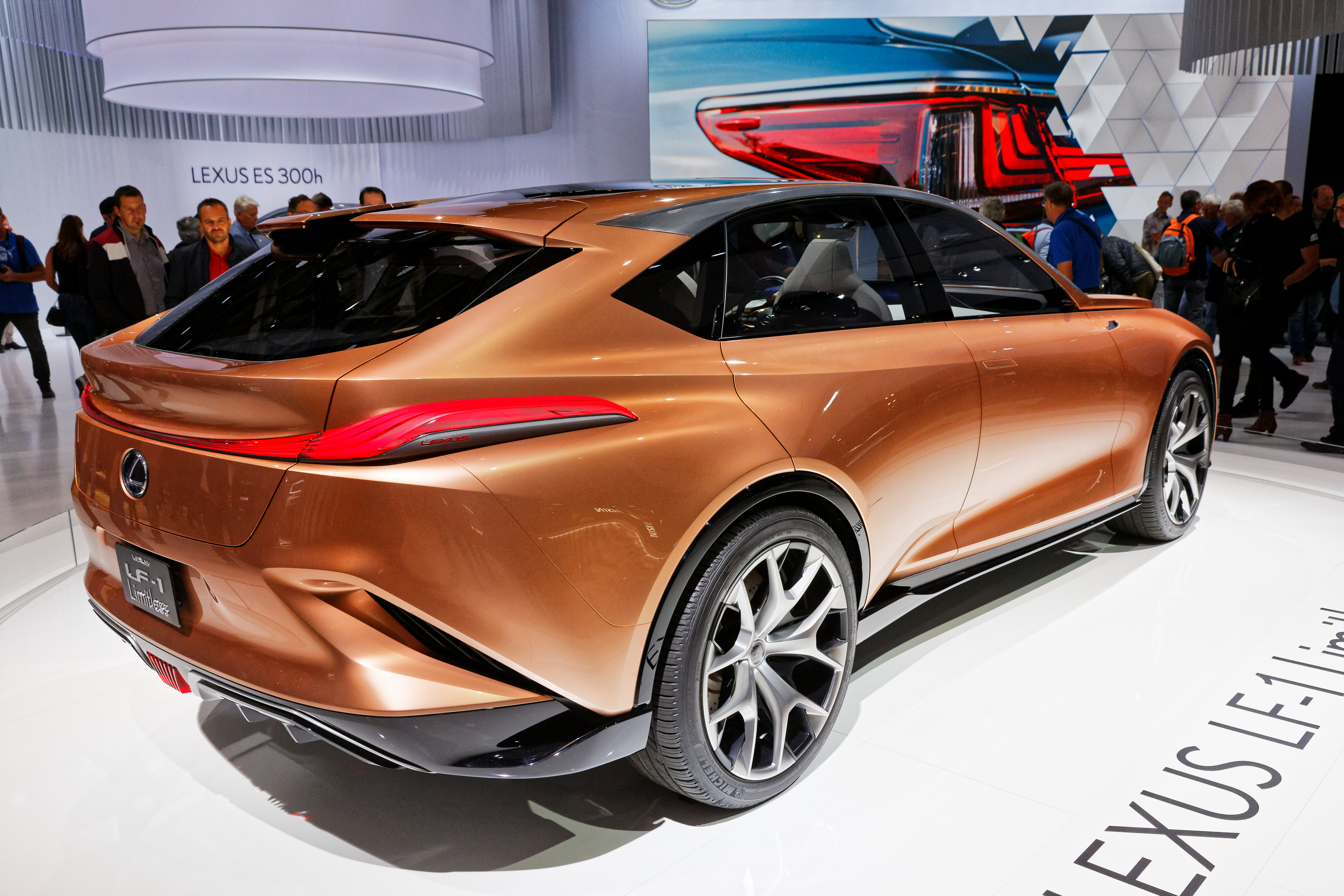
Lexus LF-1 Limitless rear view

The LF-1 Limitless is a luxury crossover concept revealed in 2018 at the North American International Auto Show as a preview for an upcoming flagship crossover.

== LF-Z Electrified ==
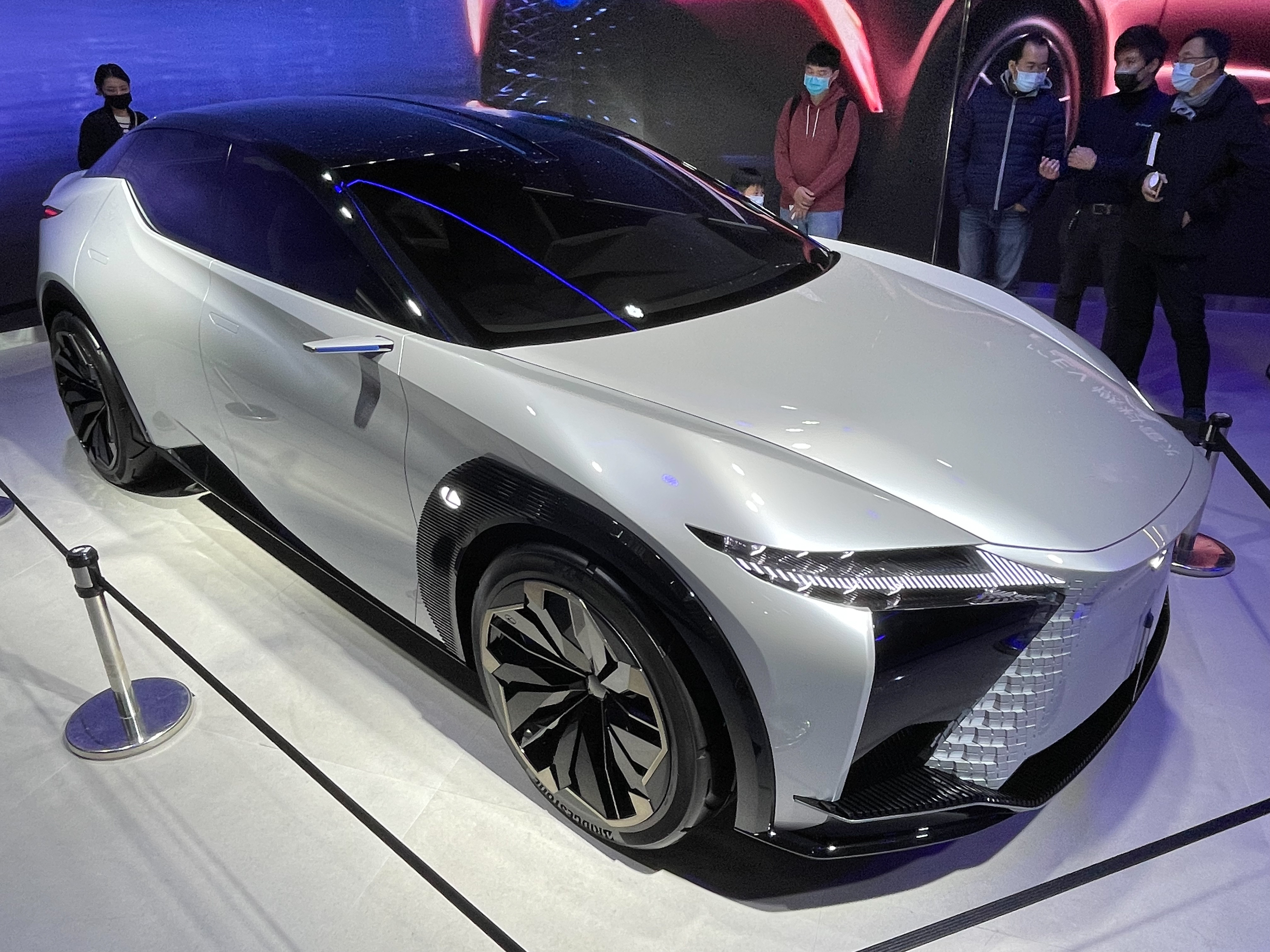
Lexus LF-Z Electrified on display in 2022.

The LF-Z Electrified is built on an all-electric platform. The concept car has the "Direct4" all-wheel drive system which allows torque to be vectored individually to each wheel using two traction motors. It carries a 90 kWh lithium-ion battery and has an estimated range of 600 km (370 mi) on the WLTP cycle used in Europe. It also has a claimed acceleration time from 0 to 100 km/h (62 mph) in 3 seconds. The design was later served as the basis for the RZ.

== LF-ZC ==
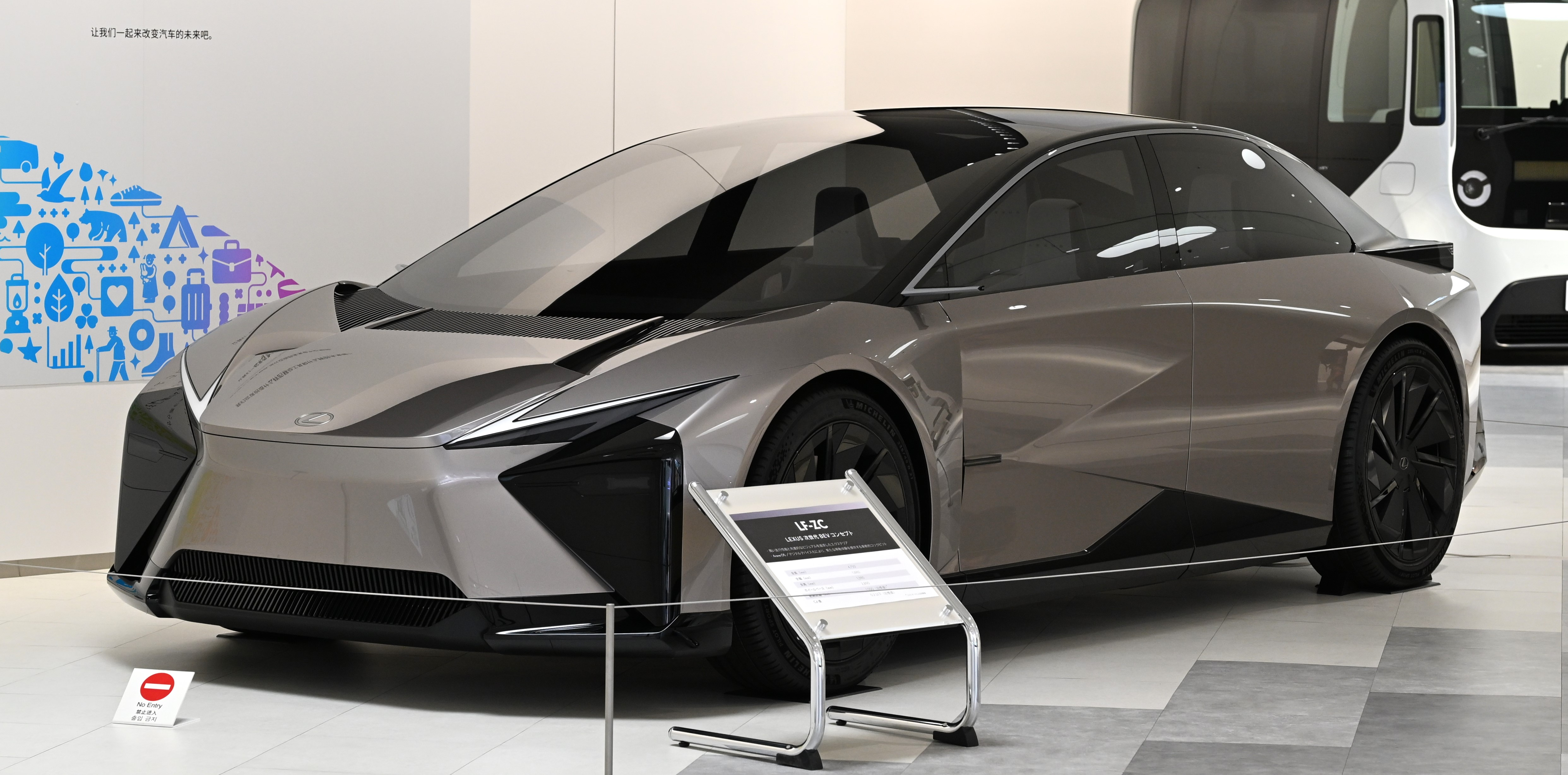
Lexus LF-ZC

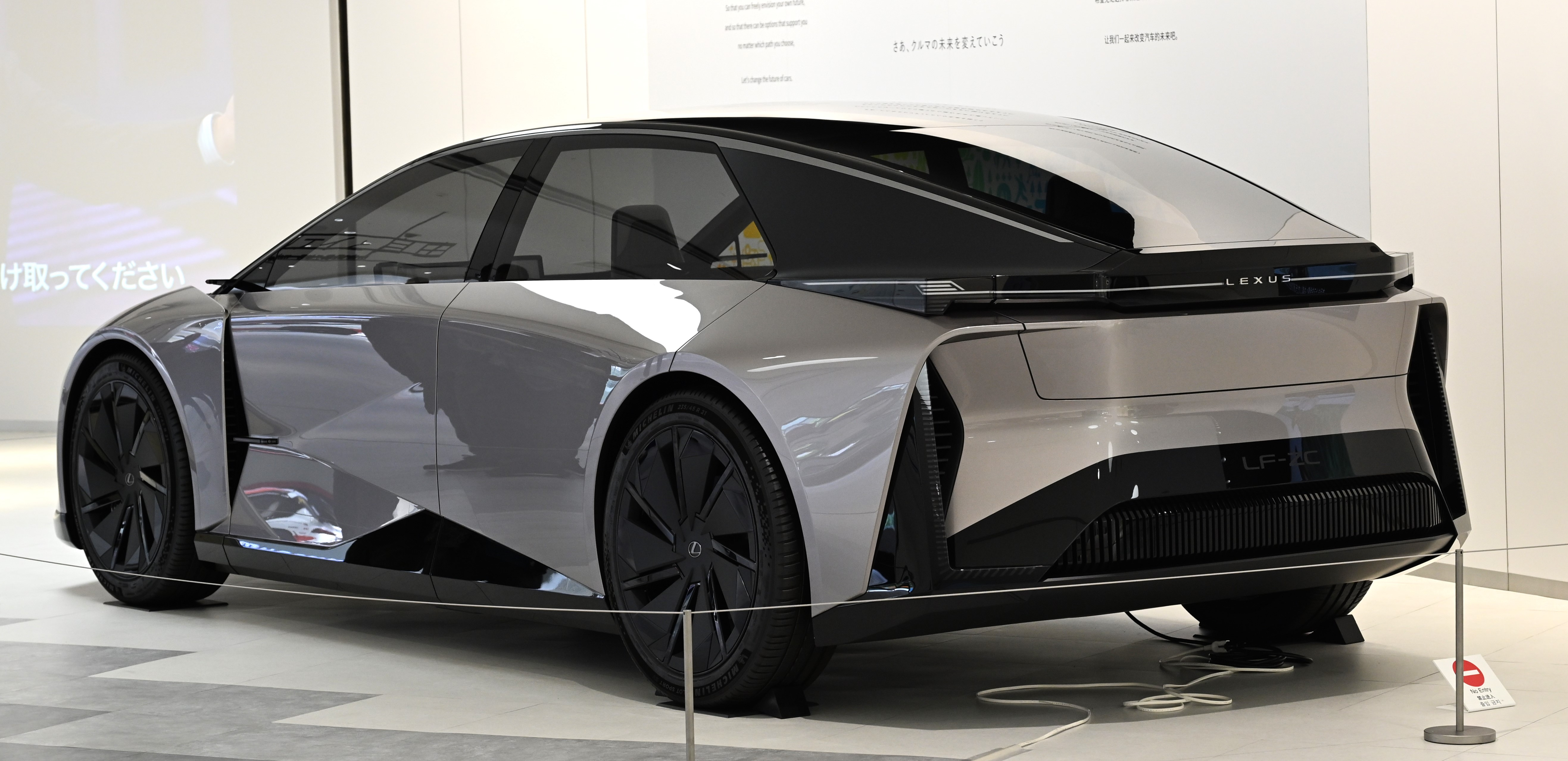
Lexus LF-ZC rear view

The LF-ZC is a luxury sedan concept which premiered at the 2023 Japan Mobility Show.

== LF-ZL ==
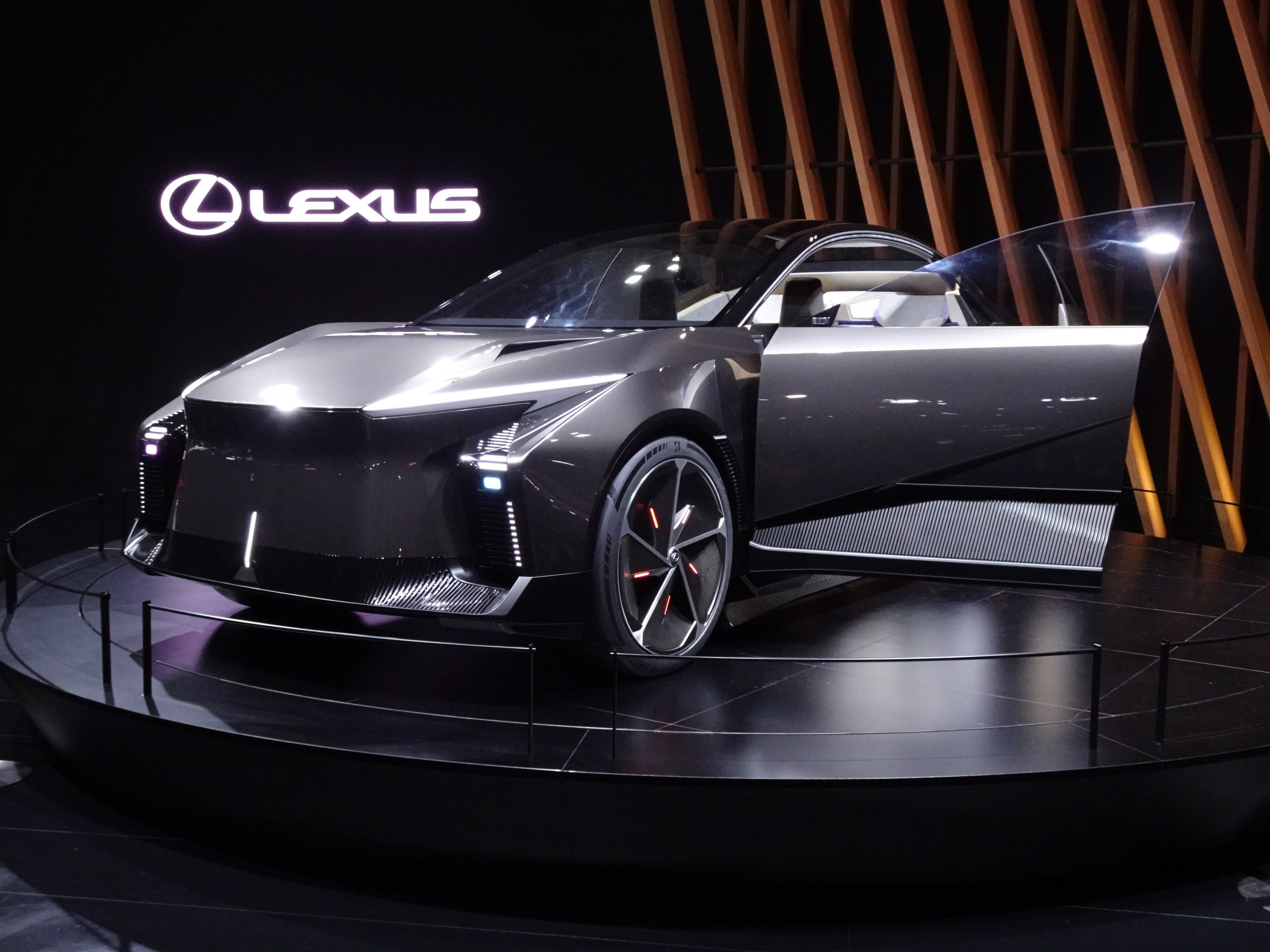
Lexus LF-ZL

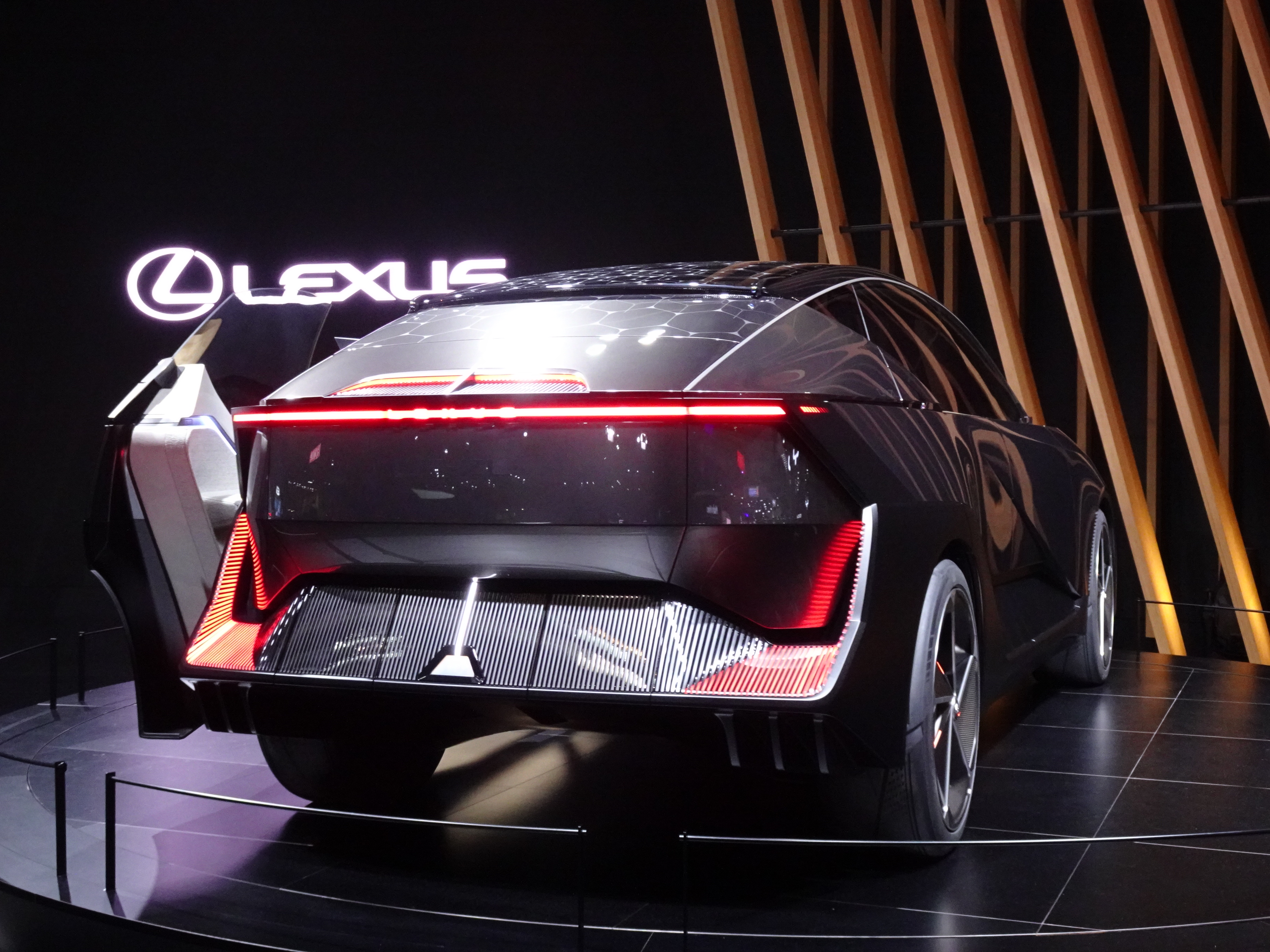
Lexus LF-ZL rear view

The LF-ZL is a luxury crossover concept which premiered at the 2023 Japan Mobility Show.
