= List of Lexus vehicles =

The following is a list of Lexus vehicles, including past and present production models, as well as concept vehicles and limited editions. Model generations are ordered by year of introduction. This list dates back to the start of production in 1989 for the 1990 model year, when Lexus was founded as the luxury division of Toyota Motor Corporation. Vehicle designations on production vehicles indicate class and powertrain size.

== Production models ==
=== Current models ===
Body style	Model			Current generation			Vehicle description
Body style	Image	Name	Introduction (cal. year)	Model code	Introduction (cal. year)	Facelift	Vehicle description
Sedan		IS	1998	XE30	2013	2025	D-segment/compact executive sedan. Also marketed as the Toyota Altezza in Japan until 2005. A global product but no longer sold in Australia, New Zealand, Europe and select other regions.
Sedan		ES	1989	XZ20	2025	–	E-segment/executive sedan based on the Toyota Camry until the 2013 model year, later Toyota Avalon.
Sedan		LS	1989	XF50	2017	2020	F-segment/full-size luxury sedan. Also marketed as the Toyota Celsior in Japan until 2006. A global product but no longer sold in Europe and North America.
Crossover SUV		LBX	2023	AY10	2023	–	Subcompact luxury crossover SUV that shares its platform with the Toyota Yaris Cross. Primarily sold in Europe and Japan.
Crossover SUV		UX	2018	ZA10	2018	–	Subcompact luxury crossover SUV that shares its platform with the Toyota C-HR and Corolla Cross.
Crossover SUV		NX	2014	AZ20	2021	2026	Compact luxury crossover SUV that shares its platform with the Toyota RAV4.
Crossover SUV		RX	1998	ALA10/ ALH10	2022	–	Two-row mid-size luxury crossover SUV that shares its platform with the Toyota Highlander.
Crossover SUV		RZ	2022	EB10	2022	2025	Battery electric two-row mid-size luxury crossover SUV that shares the e-TNGA platform with the Toyota bZ4X.
Crossover SUV		TX	2023	AU10	2023	–	Three-row full-size luxury crossover that shares its platform with the Toyota Grand Highlander. Available exclusively for the North American market.
Crossover SUV		TZ	2026		2026	-	Three-row battery electric mid-size luxury crossover that shares its platform with the Toyota Highlander BEV.
Body-on-frame SUV		GX	2002	J250	2023	–	Mid-size luxury SUV that shares its platform with the Toyota Land Cruiser Prado. Expects to be a global model by the next year. Latest generation not available in the Middle East or Europe.
Body-on-frame SUV		LX	1995	J310	2021	–	Full-size luxury SUV based on the Toyota Land Cruiser. A global product but no longer sold in Taiwan, as well as not sold in Europe, Brazil and select other markets.
MPV/ minivan		LM	2020	AW10	2023	–	Three-row luxury minivan based on the Toyota Alphard. A product only for Europe, Asia and Australasia.

== Former production vehicles ==
Image	Model	Introduced	Discontinued	Notes
	Lexus CT	2011	2022	
	Lexus GS	1993	2020	Also marketed as the Toyota Aristo in Japan until 2005
	Lexus HS	2009	2018	
	Lexus LC	2017	2026	
	Lexus LFA	2010	2012	
	Lexus RC	2014	2025	
	Lexus SC	1991	2010	Also marketed as the Toyota Soarer in Japan until 2005

== Model year introductions ==
- CT: compact FWD
  - 2011 Lexus CT 200h
- IS: compact RWD/AWD
  - 2000 Lexus IS 200/IS 300
  - 2006 Lexus IS 250/IS 250 AWD/IS 300/IS 350/IS 220d
  - 2008 Lexus IS F
  - 2010 Lexus IS 250 C/IS 300 C/IS 350 C/IS F
  - 2011 Lexus IS 220d
  - 2013 Lexus IS 250/IS 350/IS 300h
  - 2015 Lexus IS 200t
  - 2017 Lexus IS 250/IS 300/IS 350/IS 300h
  - 2021 Lexus IS 500 F Sport Performance
- HS: compact FWD
  - 2010 Lexus HS 250h
- ES: midsize FWD
  - 1990 Lexus ES 250
  - 1992 Lexus ES 300
  - 1997 Lexus ES 300
  - 2004 Lexus ES 330
  - 2007 Lexus ES 350
  - 2010 Lexus ES 240
  - 2013 Lexus ES 250/ES 300h/ES 350
  - 2015 Lexus ES 200/ES 250/ES 300h/ES 350
  - 2018 Lexus ES 200/ES 250/ES 260/ES 300h/ES 350
  - 2026 Lexus ES 300h/ES 350h/ES 350e/ES 500e
- GS: midsize RWD/AWD
  - 1993 Lexus GS 300
  - 1998 Lexus GS 300/GS 400
  - 2001 Lexus GS 430
  - 2006 Lexus GS 300/GS 300 AWD/GS 430/GS 450h
  - 2008 Lexus GS 350/GS 350 AWD/GS 460
  - 2013 Lexus GS 250/GS 350/GS 350 AWD/GS 300h/GS 450h
  - 2015 Lexus GS 200t/GS 250/GS 350/GS 350 AWD/GS 450h/GS F
- LS: full-size RWD/AWD
  - 1990 Lexus LS 400
  - 2001 Lexus LS 430
  - 2007 Lexus LS 460/LS 460 L
  - 2008 Lexus LS 600h/LS 600h L
  - 2009 Lexus LS 460/LS 460 AWD/LS 460 L/LS 460 L AWD
  - 2010 Lexus LS 460 SZ/Sport
  - 2013 Lexus LS 460/LS 460 AWD/LS 460 L/LS 460 L AWD/LS 600h L
  - 2017 Lexus LS 350/LS 500/LS 500h
- SC: coupé/coupé convertible RWD
  - 1992 Lexus SC 300/SC 400
  - 2002 Lexus SC 430
  - 2006 Lexus SC 430
- RC: coupé RWD/AWD
  - 2014 Lexus RC 300h/RC 350/RC F
  - 2016 Lexus RC 200t/RC 300
- LC: coupé RWD
  - 2016 Lexus LC 500/LC 500h
- LFA: exotic sports coupe RWD
  - 2011 Lexus LFA
  - 2012 Lexus LFA Nürburgring Package
- LBX: subcompact luxury crossover
  - 2024 Lexus LBX
- NX: compact crossover FWD/AWD
  - 2014 Lexus NX 200t/NX 300h
  - 2021 Lexus NX 200/NX 250/NX 350/NX 350h/NX 400h+/NX 450h+
- UX: subcompact luxury crossover FWD/AWD
  - 2018 Lexus UX 200/UX 250h
  - 2020 Lexus UX 300e
  - 2024 Lexus UX 300h
- RX: mid-size crossover FWD/AWD
  - 1999 Lexus RX 300
  - 2004 Lexus RX 330
  - 2006 Lexus RX 400h
  - 2007 Lexus RX 350
  - 2010 Lexus RX 350/RX 450h
  - 2011 Lexus RX 270
  - 2013 Lexus RX 270/RX 350/RX 450h
  - 2015 Lexus RX 200t/RX 350/RX 450h
  - 2022 Lexus RX 350/RX 350h/RX 450h+/RX 500h F Sport
  - 2024 Lexus RX 300
- TX: full-size crossover
  - 2024 Lexus TX 350/TX 500h/TX 550h+
- GX: full-size sport utility vehicle AWD
  - 2003 Lexus GX 470
  - 2010 Lexus GX 460
  - 2012 Lexus GX 400
  - 2023 Lexus GX 550
- LX: full-size sport utility vehicle AWD
  - 1997 Lexus LX 450
  - 1999 Lexus LX 470
  - 2008 Lexus LX 470/LX 570
  - 2013 Lexus LX 460/LX 570
  - 2016 Lexus LX 570
  - 2021 Lexus LX 600/LX 500d
  - 2024 Lexus LX 700h
- LM: minivan FWD / AWD
  - 2020 Lexus LM 350/LM 300h
  - 2023 Lexus LM 350h/LM 500h
- RZ: Battery electric luxury crossover AWD
  - 2023 Lexus RZ 450e
  - 2023 Lexus RZ 300e
  - 2025 Lexus RZ 350e
  - 2025 Lexus RZ 500e
  - 2025 Lexus RZ 550e F Sport
  - 2026 Lexus RZ 600e F Sport Performance

=== F Sport models ===
- CT F Sport
  - 2011 Lexus CT 200h F Sport
  - 2014 Lexus CT 200h F Sport
- IS F Sport
  - 2011 Lexus IS 250/350/200d/250 C/350 C F Sport
  - 2013 Lexus IS 250/300h/350 F Sport
- GS F Sport
  - 2013 Lexus GS 350 F Sport
  - 2013 Lexus GS 450h F Sport
- LS F Sport
  - 2013 Lexus LS 460 F Sport
  - 2013 Lexus LS 600h F Sport
- RX F Sport
  - 2013 Lexus RX 350 F Sport
  - 2013 Lexus RX 450h F Sport
- NX F Sport
  - 2014 Lexus NX 200t F Sport
- RC F Sport
  - 2014 Lexus RC 350 F Sport

=== Special editions ===
- CT: Compact Car
  - 2018 CT 200h Black Sequence
- IS: compact RWD/AWD
  - 2003 SportDesign IS 300
  - 2007 Limited Edition IS 250 X
  - 2007 Neiman Marcus Edition IS F
  - 2007 "Elegant White" IS 250/350
  - 2009 Special Edition IS 250 SR
  - 2009 "Red-edge Black" IS 250/350
  - 2009 "Blazing Terracotta" IS F
  - 2010 "X-Edition" IS 250
  - 2010 IS 350 C F Sport Special Edition
  - 2011 Stone Works "Sunrise" IS 250
  - 2018 IS 300 / IS 300h / IS 350 Black Sequence
  - 2020 IS 300 / IS 300 AWD / IS 350 F-Sport Black Line Edition
- ES: midsize FWD
  - 1996 Coach Edition ES 300
  - 1999 Coach Edition ES 300
  - 2000 Platinum Edition ES 300
  - 2004 SportDesign ES 330
  - 2005 Black Diamond Edition ES 330
  - 2008 Pebble Beach Edition ES 350
  - 2009 Pebble Beach Edition ES 350
- GS: midsize RWD/AWD
  - 2000 Platinum Series GS 300/400
  - 2001 SportDesign GS 300
  - 2007 Neiman Marcus Edition GS 450h
  - 2009 "Passionate Black" GS 350/460/450h
  - 2009 "Meteor Black" GS 350/460
  - 2011 Stone Works "Sunset" GS 350
  - 2018 GS 300/ GS 300h / GS 350 / GS 450h Black Sequence
- LS: full-size RWD/AWD
  - 1997 Coach Edition LS 400
  - 2000 Platinum Series LS 400
  - 2007 Neiman Marcus Launch Edition LS 600h L
  - 2009 Pebble Beach Edition LS 600h L
  - 2020 LS 500 Inspiration Series
- SC: coupé/coupé convertible RWD
  - 2004 Pebble Beach Edition SC 430
  - 2005 Pebble Beach Edition SC 430
  - 2006 Pebble Beach Edition SC 430
  - 2007, 2008, 2009 Pebble Beach SC 430
  - 2010 "Eternal Jewel" SC 430
- LFA: exotic sports coupe RWD
  - 2012 LFA Special Edition
- LC: Coupe RWD
  - 2019 LC 500/LC500h Structural Blue
  - 2019 LC 500 Raster Yellow
  - 2019 LC 500/LC 500h Patina Elegance
  - 2020 LC 500 Inspiration Series
- UX:subcompact Crossover
  - 2020 UX 200 Blue Edition
  - 2020 UX 250h Brown Edition
- NX: Compact Crossover
  - 2018 NX 300 / NX 300h Black Sequence
  - 2020 NX 300 Black Line Edition
  - 2020 NX 300 Bronze Edition
- RX: midsize crossover SUV
  - 2001 SilverSport Special Edition RX 300
  - 2002 Coach Edition RX 300
  - 2005 Thundercloud Edition RX 330
  - 2009 Pebble Beach Edition RX 350
  - 2011 Stone Works "Sunlight" RX 350
  - 2018 RX 300 / RX 450h Black Sequence
- LX: full-size sport utility vehicle
  - 2007 Limited Edition LX 470
  - 2015 LX 570 Supercharged
  - 2018 LX 570 Black Sequence
  - 2019 LX 570 Inspiration Series

== Concept vehicles ==
- LF series concepts
  - 2003 LF-X: crossover
  - 2003 LF-S: luxury sedan
  - 2004 LF-C: convertible
  - 2005 LF-A: sports coupe
  - 2006 LF-Sh: hybrid luxury sedan
  - 2007 LF-Xh: hybrid crossover
  - 2008 LF-AR: roadster
  - 2009 LF-Ch: compact hybrid
  - 2011 LF-Gh: hybrid touring sedan
  - 2012 LF-LC: hybrid coupe
  - 2013 LF-NX: small crossover SUV
  - 2013 LF-C2: RC convertible
  - 2015 LF-SA: Compact car
  - 2015 LF-FC: fuel cell concept car
  - 2016 LF-UX: small crossover SUV
  - 2018 LF-1 Limitless: crossover SUV
  - 2019 LF-30
  - 2021 LF-Z Electrified: electric crossover SUV
  - 2023 LF-ZC: electric compact car
  - 2023 LF-ZL: electric crossover SUV
- Production-based concepts
  - 2003 Lexus IS 430 sports sedan
  - 2004 Carolina Herrera SC 430 CH
  - 2005 Milan Design Week "L-finesse" LF-A
  - 2006 Milan Design Week "Evolving Fiber" LS 460
  - 2007 Higashifuji Driving Simulator LS 460
  - 2007 Milan Design Week "Invisible Garden" LS 600h L
  - 2008 Milan Design Week "Elastic Diamond" LF-Xh
  - 2008 IS F Racing concept
  - 2009 LS 460 ITS-Safety Concept
  - 2009 Crystallised Wind LFA
  - 2010 IS F CCS Concept
  - 2010 CT Umbra
  - 2011 CT Racing concept
  - 2012 TS 650
  - 2022 NX PHEV Offroad Concept
- Other concept vehicles
  - 1994 Italdesign Lexus Landau: hatchback
  - 1995 Lexus FLV: station wagon
  - 1997 Lexus Street Rod: roadster
  - 1997 Lexus SLV: sport luxury vehicle
  - 1997 Lexus HPS: sports sedan
  - 1999 Lexus Sports Coupe: convertible
  - 2003 Lexus HPX: crossover
  - 2009 Lexus HB: hybrid sports motorbike
  - 2016 Lexus UX: crossover
  - 2017 Lexus LS+: luxury sedan
  - 2019 Lexus LY-650 Yacht
  - 2021 Lexus ROV Concept: side-by-side
  - 2021 Lexus Electrified Sedan: sedan
  - 2021 Lexus Electrified SUV: crossover
  - 2021 Lexus Electrified Sport: sports car
  - 2021 Lexus BEV Sport Concept: sports coupe
  - 2025 Lexus LFA BEV: sports coupe
  - 2025 Lexus LS Concept: six-wheeled MPV
  - 2025 Lexus LS Coupe Concept: crossover
  - 2025 Lexus LS Micro Concept: autonomous pod
  - 2025 Lexus Catamaran Concept: sailboat
- Number Série
  - 2002 Lexus 2054

== Series generations ==
=== Hatchbacks ===
==== Lexus CT ====
Lexus CT
Generation	Model name	Chassis code	Engine	Production (calendar years)	Class	Image
I	CT 200h	ZWA10	1.8 L 2ZR-FXE I4	2010–2022	Compact hybrid hatchback	

=== Sedans ===
==== Lexus ES ====
Lexus ES
Generation	Model name	Toyota name	Chassis code	Engine	Production (calendar years)	Class	Image
I	ES 250	Camry Prominent	VZV21	2.5 L 2VZ-FE V6	1989–1991	Mid-size sedan	
II	ES 300	Windom	VCV10	3.0L 3VZ-FE V6	1991–1996	Mid-size sedan	
III	ES 300	Windom	MCV20	3.0 L 1MZ-FE V6	1996–2001	Mid-size sedan	
IV	ES 300; ES 330	Windom	MCV30	3.0 L 1MZ-FE V6; 3.3 L 3MZ-FE V6	2001–2006	Mid-size sedan	
V	ES 240; ES 350		ACV40; GSV40	2.4 L 2AZ-FE I4; 3.5 L 2GR-FE V6	2006–2012	Mid-size sedan	
VI	ES 200; ES 250; ES 300h ES 350		ASV61; ASV60; AVV60; GSV60	2.0 L 6AR-FSE I4; 2.5 L 2AR-FE I4; 2.5 L 2AR-FXE I4; 3.5 L 2GR-FE V6	2012–2018	Mid-size sedan	
VII	ES 200; ES 250 (ES 260 in China); ES 300h ES 350		ASZ10; AXZA10; AXZH10; GSZ10	2.0 L 6AR-FSE I4; 2.5 L A25A-FKS I4; 2.5 L A25A-FXS I4; 3.5 L 2GR-FKS V6	2018–2025	Mid-size sedan	
VIII	ES 300h ES 350h ES 350e ES 500e			2.0 L M20A-FXS; 2.5 L A25A-FXS	2025–present	Mid-size sedan	

==== Lexus GS ====
Lexus GS
Generation	Model name	Toyota name	Chassis code	Engine	Production (calendar years)	Class	Image
I	GS 300	Aristo	JZS147	3.0 L 2JZ-GE I6	1993-1997	Mid-size sedan	
II	GS 300; GS 400; GS 430	Aristo	JZS160; UZS160; UZS161	3.0 L 2JZ-GE I6; 4.0 L 1UZ-FE V8; 4.3 L 3UZ-FE V8	1997–2005	Mid-size sedan	
III	GS 300; GS 430; GS 450h GS 350; GS 460		GRS190; UZS190; GWS191; GRS191; URS190	3.0 L 3GR-FSE V6; 3.5 L 2GR-FSE V6; 4.3 L 3UZ-FE V8; 4.6 L 1UR-FE V8	2005–2011	Mid-size sedan	
IV	GS 200t/GS 300; GS 300h GS 250; GS 350; GS 450h GS F		ARL10; AWL10; GRL11; GRL10/15; GWL10; URL10	2.0 L 8AR-FTS I4; 2.5 L 2AR-FSE I4; 2.5 L 4GR-FSE V6; 3.5 L 2GR-FSE/2GR-FKS V6; 3.5 L 2GR-FXE V6; 5.0 L 2UR-GSE V8	2011–2020	Mid-size sedan	

==== Lexus HS ====
Lexus HS
Generation	Model name	Chassis code	Engine	Production (calendar years)	Class	Image
I	HS 250h	ANF10	2.4L 2AZ-FXE I4	2009–2018	Compact hybrid sedan	

==== Lexus IS ====
Lexus IS
Generation	Model name	Toyota name	Chassis code	Engine	Production (calendar years)	Class	Image
I	IS 200; IS 300; SportCross	Altezza	GXE10; JCE10	2.0 L 1G-FE I6; 3.0 L 2JZ-GE I6	1998–2005	Compact sedan Compact hatchback/wagon	
II	IS 200d IS 220d IS 250/IS 250C; IS 300/IS 300C; IS 350/IS 350C; IS F		ALE20; GSE20/25; GSE22; GSE21; USE20	2.2 L 2AD-FHV I4; 2.5 L 4GR-FSE V6; 3.0 L 3GR-FE V6; 3.5 L 2GR-FSE V6; 5.0 L 2UR-GSE V8	2005–2013	Compact sedan Compact coupé convertible	
III	IS 200t/IS 300; IS 250; IS 300h IS 300 AWD/IS 350; IS 500 F Sport Performance		ASE30; GSE30/35; ASE30/35; GSE31/36/37; USE30	2.0 L 8AR-FTS I4; 2.5 L 4GR-FSE V6; 2.5 L 2AR-FSE I4; 3.5 L 2GR-FSE V6; 5.0 L 2UR-GSE V8	2013–present	Compact sedan	

==== Lexus LS ====
Lexus LS
Generation	Model name	Toyota name	Chassis code	Engine	Production (calendar years)	Class	Image
I	LS 400	Celsior	UCF10	4.0 L 1UZ-FE V8	1989–1994	Full-size sedan	
II	LS 400	Celsior	UCF20	4.0 L 1UZ-FE V8	1994–2000	Full-size sedan	
III	LS 430	Celsior	UCF30	4.3 L 3UZ-FE V8	2000–2006	Full-size sedan	
IV	LS 460; LS 460 L LS 600h LS 600h L		USF40/41; UVF45/46	4.6 L 1UR-FSE V8; 4.6 L 1UR-FE V8; 5.0 L 2UR-FSE V8	2006–2017	Full-size sedan	
V	LS 350 (China-only); LS 500; LS 500h		GSF50; VXFA50/55; GVF50/55	3.5 L 2GR-FKS V6; 3.4 L V35A-FTS V6; 3.5 L 8GR-FXS V6	2017–present	Full-size sedan	

=== Coupes ===
==== Lexus LC ====
Lexus LC
Generation	Model name	Chassis code	Engine	Production (calendar years)	Class	Image
I	LC 500; LC 500h	URZ100; GWZ100	5.0 L 2UR-GSE V8; 3.5 L 8GR-FXS V6	2017–2026	Grand tourer	

==== Lexus LFA ====
Lexus LFA
Generation	Model name	Chassis code	Engine	Production (calendar years)	Class	Image
I	LFA	LFA10	4.8 L 1LR-GUE V10	2010–2012	Sports car	

==== Lexus RC ====
Lexus RC
Generation	Model name	Chassis code	Engine	Production (calendar years)	Class	Image
I	RC 200t/RC 300; RC 300h RC 350; RC F	ASC10/15; AVC10; GSC10/15; USC10	2.0 L 8AR-FTS I4; 2.5 L 2AR-FSE I4; 3.5 L 2GR-FSE V6; 5.0 L 2UR-GSE V8	2014–2025	Compact coupé	

==== Lexus SC ====
Lexus SC
Generation	Model name	Toyota name	Chassis code	Engine	Production (calendar years)	Class	Image
I	SC 400; SC 300	Soarer	UZZ31; JZZ31	4.0 L 1UZ-FE V8; 3.0 L 2JZ-GE I6	1991–2000	Grand tourer	
II	SC 430	Soarer	UZZ40	4.3 L 3UZ-FE V8	2001–2010	Grand tourer	

=== Crossovers ===
==== Lexus LBX ====
Lexus LBX
Generation	Model name	Chassis code	Engine	Production (calendar years)	Class	Image
I	LBX; LBX Morizo RR	MAYH10; MAYH15; GAYA16	M15A-FXE; G16E-GTS	2023–present	Subcompact crossover SUV	

==== Lexus UX ====
Lexus UX
Generation	Model name	Chassis code	Engine	Production (calendar years)	Class	Image
I	UX 200; UX 250h (UX 260h in China); UX 300h UX 300e	MZAA10; MZAH10/15; MZAH11/16; KMA10	2.0 L M20A-FKS I4; 2.0 L M20A-FXS I4; 4KM synchronous motor	2018–present	Subcompact crossover SUV	

==== Lexus NX ====
Lexus NX
Generation	Model name	Chassis code	Engine	Production (calendar years)	Class	Image
I	NX 200; NX 200t/NX 300; NX 300h	ZGZ10; AGZ10/15; AYZ10	2.0 L 3ZR-FAE I4; 2.0 L 8AR-FTS I4; 2.5 L 2AR-FXE I4	2014–2021	Compact crossover SUV	
II	NX 200; NX 250; NX 350; NX 350h/NX 400h+/NX450h+	MAZA20; AAZA20/25; TAZA25; AAZH20/21/25/26	2.0 L M20A-FKS I4; 2.5 LA25A-FKS I4; 2.4 L T24A-FTS I4; 2.5 L A25A-FXS I4	2021–present	Compact crossover SUV	

==== Lexus RZ ====
Lexus RZ
Generation	Model name	Chassis code	Engine	Production (calendar years)	Class	Image
I	RZ 300e RZ 350e RZ 450e RZ 500e RZ 550e F Sport; RZ 600e F Sport Performance	XEBM10; XEBM15; XEBM25		2023–present	Compact crossover SUV	

==== Lexus RX ====
Lexus RX
Generation	Model name	Toyota name	Chassis code	Engine	Production (calendar years)	Class	Image
I	RX 300	Harrier	MCU10/15	3.0 L 1MZ-FE V6	1997–2003	Compact crossover SUV	
II	RX 300; RX 330; RX 350; RX 400h	Harrier	MCU33/38; GSU30/35; MHU33/38	3.0 L 1MZ-FE V6; 3.3 L 3MZ-FE V6; 3.5 L 2GR-FE V6	2003–2008	Mid-size crossover SUV	
III	RX 270; RX 350; RX 450h		AGL10; GGL10/15; GVL10/15	2.7 L 1AR-FE I4; 3.5 L 2GR-FE V6; 3.5 L 2GR-FXE V6	2008–2015	Mid-size crossover SUV	
IV	RX 200t/RX 300; RX 350; RX 450h		AGL20/25; GGL20/25; GYL20/25	2.0 L 8AR-FTS I4; 3.5 L 2GR-FKS V6; 3.5 L 2GR-FXS V6	2015–2022	Mid-size crossover SUV	
V	RX 300 (China-only); RX 350; RX 350h/RX 450h+ RX 500h F Sport		TALA10/15; AALH16; TALH17	2.0 L S20A-FTS I4; 2.5 L A25A-FXS I4; 2.4 L T24A-FTS I4	2022–present	Mid-size crossover SUV	

==== Lexus TX ====
Lexus TX
Generation	Model name	Chassis code	Engine	Production (calendar years)	Class	Image
I	TX 350; TX 500h TX 550h+	TAUA10/15; TAUH15; GYU15	2.4 L T24A-FTS turbo I4; 3.5 L 2GR-FXS V6	2023–present	Full-size crossover SUV	

=== SUVs ===
==== Lexus GX ====
Lexus GX
Generation	Model name	Toyota name	Chassis code	Engine	Production (calendar years)	Class	Image
I	GX 470	Land Cruiser Prado	UZJ120	4.7 L 2UZ-FE V8	2002–2009	Full-size SUV	
II	GX 460; GX 400	Land Cruiser Prado	URJ150; GRJ150	4.6 L 3UR-FE V8; 4.0 L 1GR-FE V6	2009–2023	Full-size SUV	
III	GX 550	Land Cruiser Prado/250	TJA250; VJA250	2.4 L T24A-FTS turbo hybrid I4; 3.4 L V35A-FTS twin-turbo V6	2023–present	Full-size SUV	

==== Lexus LX ====
Lexus LX
Generation	Model name	Toyota name	Chassis code	Engine	Production (calendar years)	Class	Image
I	LX 450	Land Cruiser	FZJ80	4.5 L 1FZ-FE I6	1995–1997	Full-size SUV	
II	LX 470	Land Cruiser Cygnus	UZJ100	4.7 L 2UZ-FE V8	1998–2007	Full-size SUV	
III	LX 450d LX 460; LX 470; LX 570	Land Cruiser	VDJ200; URJ200; UZJ200	4.5 L 1VD-FTV V8; 4.6 L 1UR-FE V8; 4.7 L 2UZ-FE V8; 5.7 L 3UR-FE V8	2007–2021	Full-size SUV	
IV	LX 500d LX 600; LX 700h	Land Cruiser	FJA310; VJA310	3.3 L F33A-FTV V6; 3.4 L V35A-FTS V6	2021–present	Full-size SUV	

=== MPVs ===
==== Lexus LM ====
Lexus LM
Generation	Model name	Toyota name	Chassis code	Engine	Production (calendar years)	Class	Image
I	LM 350; LM 300h	Alphard	GGH31; AYH36	3.5 L 2GR-FE V6; 3.5 L 2GR-FKS V6; 2.5 L 2AR-FXE I4	2019–2023	Minivan	
II	LM 350h LM 500h		AAWH10; AAWH15; TAWH15	2.5 L A25A-FKS I4; 2.4 L T24A-FTS I4	2023–present	Minivan	

== Model nomenclature ==
Lexus production model names use the following capital letters:

- S = Sedan or Sport
- C = Coupe
- T = Touring
- X = SUV
- M = MPV

Additional letters indicate powertrain type, or special category:

- AWD = all-wheel drive
- F = F-marque
- L = Long wheelbase
- d = Diesel
- h = Hybrid
- t = Turbo
- e = Electric
- + = Plug-in-hybrid

== See also ==
- Lexus F
- Lexus LF
- List of automobiles
- List of Toyota engines
- List of Toyota vehicles
