= Lexus F =

High-performance division of cars produced by Lexus

F
- Company type: Marque
- Industry: Automotive industry
- Founded: 2006
- Key people: Yukihiko Yaguchi
- Products: Performance engines and cars Automotive sports accessories
- Services: Research and development
- Owner: Toyota Motor Corporation
- Parent: Lexus
- Website: www.lexus.com/performance

The Lexus F and F-Sport marque is the high-performance division of cars produced by Lexus. The F is short for flagship and Fuji Speedway, the chief test site of Lexus performance vehicle development in Oyama, Suntō District, Shizuoka Prefecture, Japan.

A related performance trim line, Lexus F Sport, was launched for 2007, with an F Sport accessory line and factory models in 2010.

Lexus F models originated from the Lexus Vehicle Performance Development Division has also been involved with the brand's racing activities.

== Origins ==
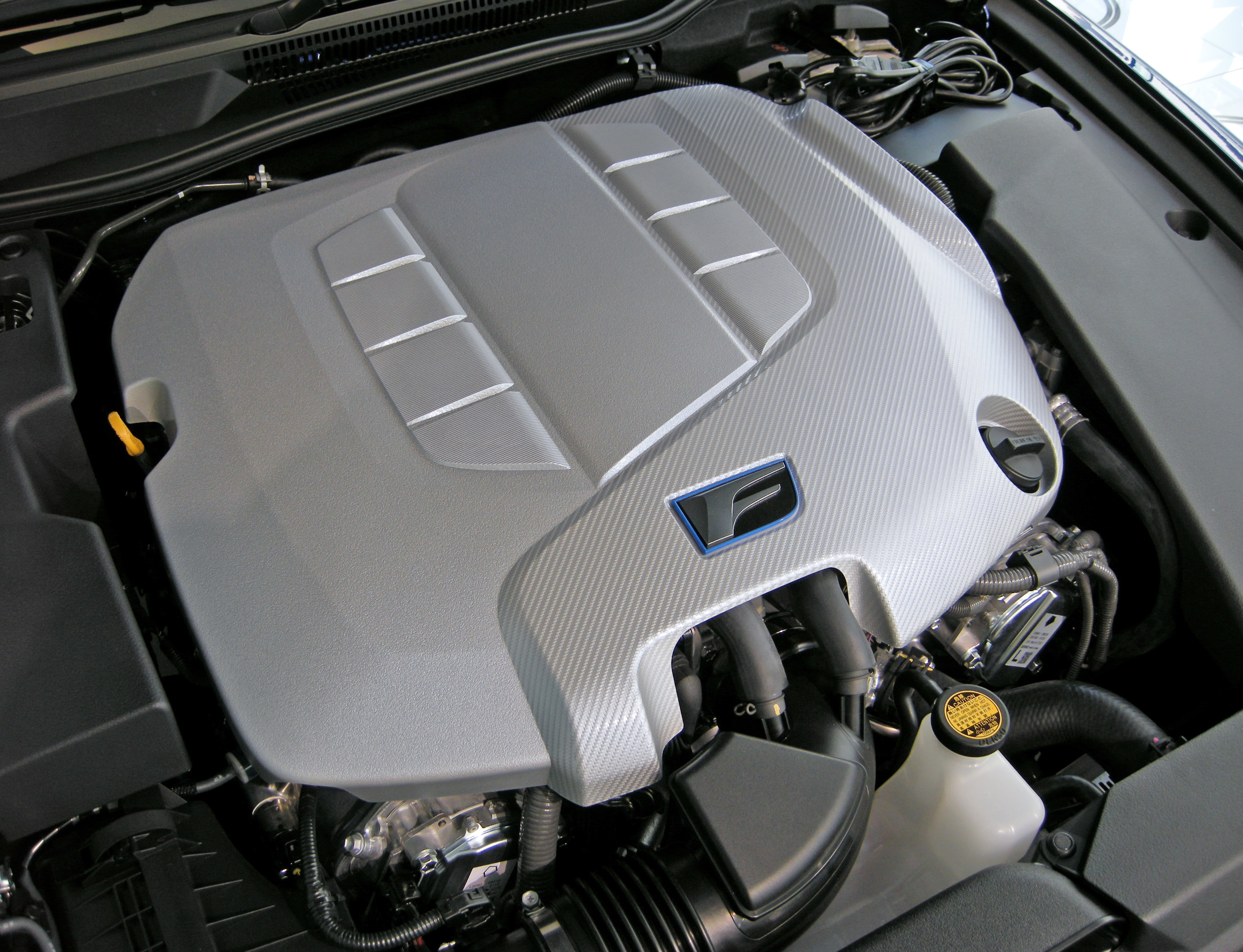
F marque V8 engine

The F designation was originally used at Lexus' launch in 1989, as an internal code for the development of its first flagship vehicle the LS.

In late 2006, Lexus filed trademark applications for an "F" emblem, leading to speculation that the luxury marque was about to launch a performance brand. At the time it was suggested that F stood for "Fast" or "Flagship." Later reports surmised that F referred to the Fuji Speedway whose first corner, 27R, was said to have inspired the shape of the "F" emblem. Company representatives mentioned in prior years of possibly starting a performance brand to compete with the likes of Mercedes' AMG, Audi's S/RS, Cadillac's V-series, and BMW's M division, among others. An earlier in-house tuning effort, the TRD-based L-Tuned, had offered performance packages on the IS 300 and GS 400 sedans in the early 2000s. Lexus' racing activities and sports model development had been handled by the Lexus Vehicle Performance Development Division, a branch of the Lexus Development Center, located in Aichi, Japan.

In September 2006, Lexus announced that the first vehicle in the F marque lineup, the Lexus IS F sedan, previously known in the press as the IS 500, would premiere at the North American International Auto Show in January 2007. The vehicle subsequently premiered in Detroit along with a redesigned version of the concept LF-A sports car. It was marketed that a "skunkworks" team directed by Yukihiko Yaguchi, who had previously worked on the Toyota Supra, had designed the new car.

A performance variant of the LS flagship, the LS 460 Sport, was released in 2010, and followed by F Sport versions of the CT 200h, GS 250, GS 350, and RX 350.

== F marque models ==
=== Lexus IS F ===
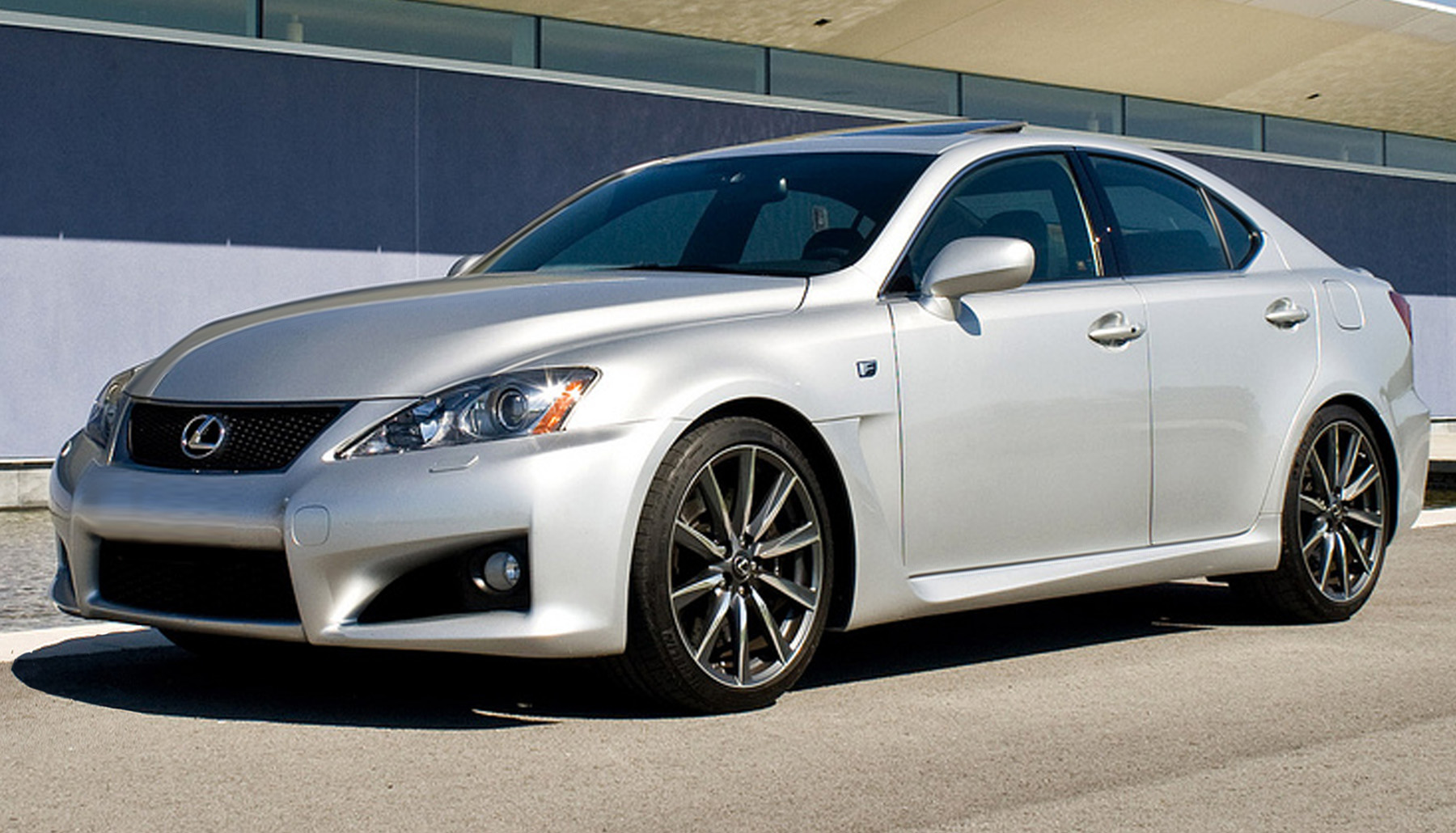
Lexus IS-F, the first Lexus F model

The Lexus IS F debuted at the North American International Auto Show on 8 January 2007. The vehicle features a 5.0 L direct-injected V8 producing 416 SAE hp (423 PS, 311 kW) at 6,600 rpm, while peak torque is 371 ft⋅lbf (503 N⋅m) at 5,200 rpm. The engine also features a two-stage intake system, engine oil and automatic transmission fluid coolers and an oil pump designed for high-speed cornering. Compared to the 2GR-FSE V6, 306 hp (228 kW) IS 350, the IS F features a 2UR-GSE V8 engine and over 400 hp (300 kW). The IS F was scheduled to be in dealerships by early 2008.

The IS F made its European premiere at the Frankfurt Motor Show in September 2007, and premiered in Japan at the Fuji Speedway in October 2007. The vehicle went on sale in late 2007 in Japan, in early 2008 in the United States, and in Europe in 2008.

=== Lexus LFA ===
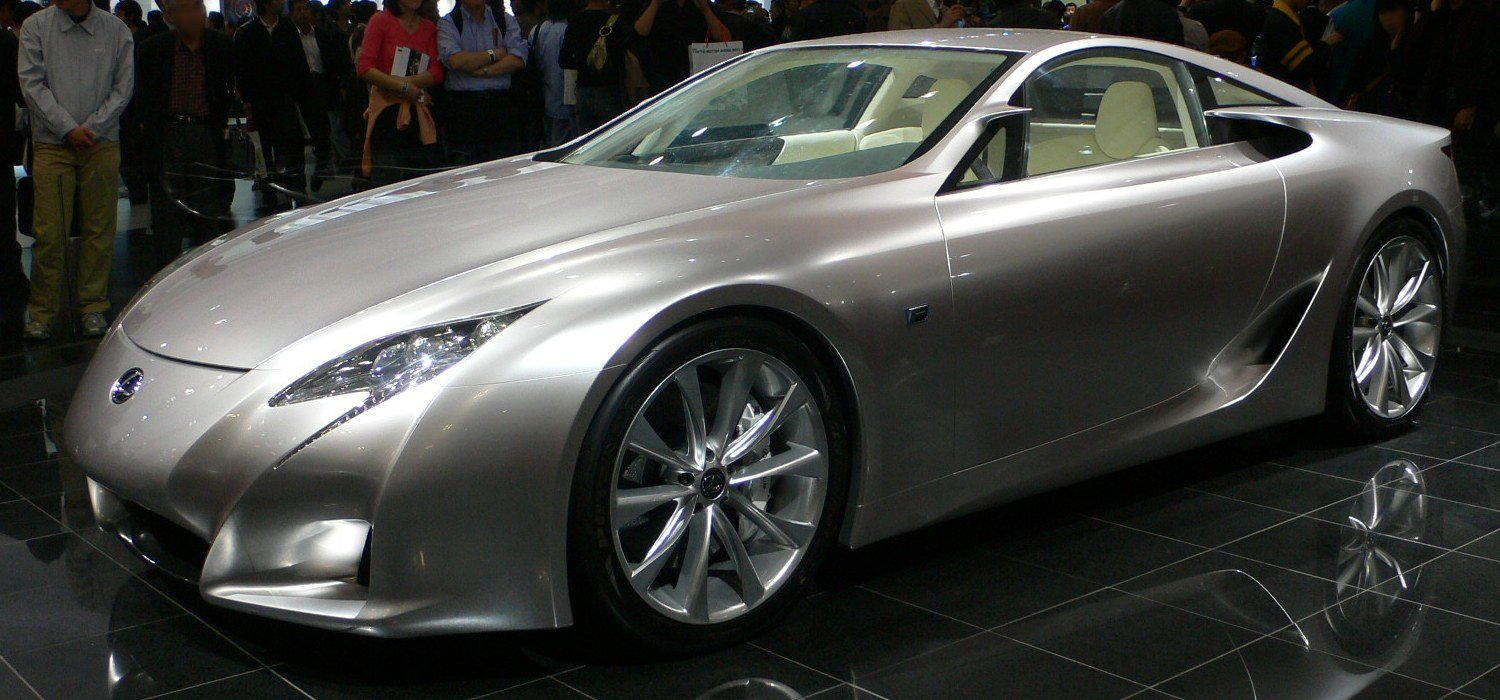
The F marque Lexus LF-A concept

The Lexus LFA is a 2-seat coupe first unveiled as an F marque concept at the 2007 NAIAS. The original LF-A concept had a 4.8 liter V10 engine which produced an estimated 552 horsepower (411 kW) with a claimed top speed of approximately 200 mph (320 km/h). Automotive media reports indicated that the LF-A concept car was approved for production. Prototypes of the LF-A had been spotted being tested at the Nürburgring race track in Germany. On 10 May 2008, a LF-A prototype was entered on the Nürburgring 4 hour VLN endurance race where it won the SP8 class. The vehicle was also entered in the 24 Hours Nürburgring where it qualified 27th among 223 cars, and finished 7th in the SP8 class.

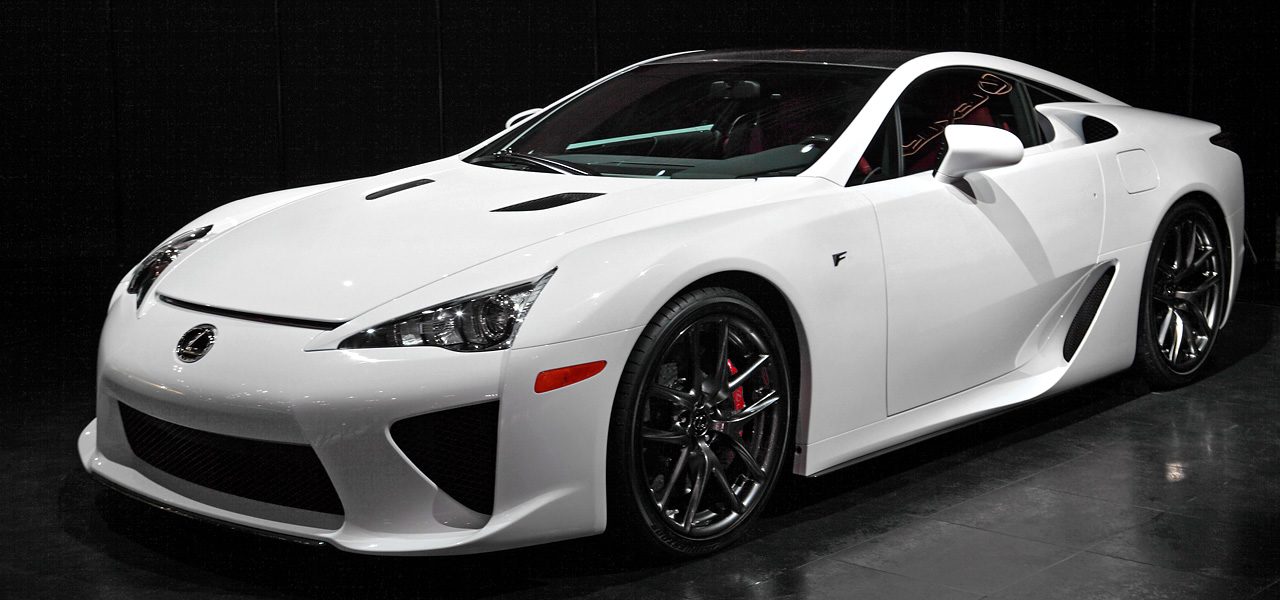
The production Lexus LFA

On 4 April 2009, an LF-A won the SP8 class in the ADAC-Westfalenfahrt VLN 4h endurance race. An F marque roadster version of the LF-A concept car (designated LF-A Roadster or LF-AR) was shown at the 2008 North American International Auto Show on January 13, 2008. Initial specifications for the roadster were for a V10 engine under 5.0 L with over 500 hp and a top speed of over 200 mph. The LF-A Roadster had a retractable rear spoiler for improved handling at speed.

The production Lexus LFA was launched on October 21, 2009, at the Tokyo Motor Show. The vehicle was limited to 500 hand-built units with base price estimated at $375,000. At the Tokyo Motor Show, a circuit-ready model, the Nürburgring Edition, was also announced for 2012 release.

=== Lexus RC F ===
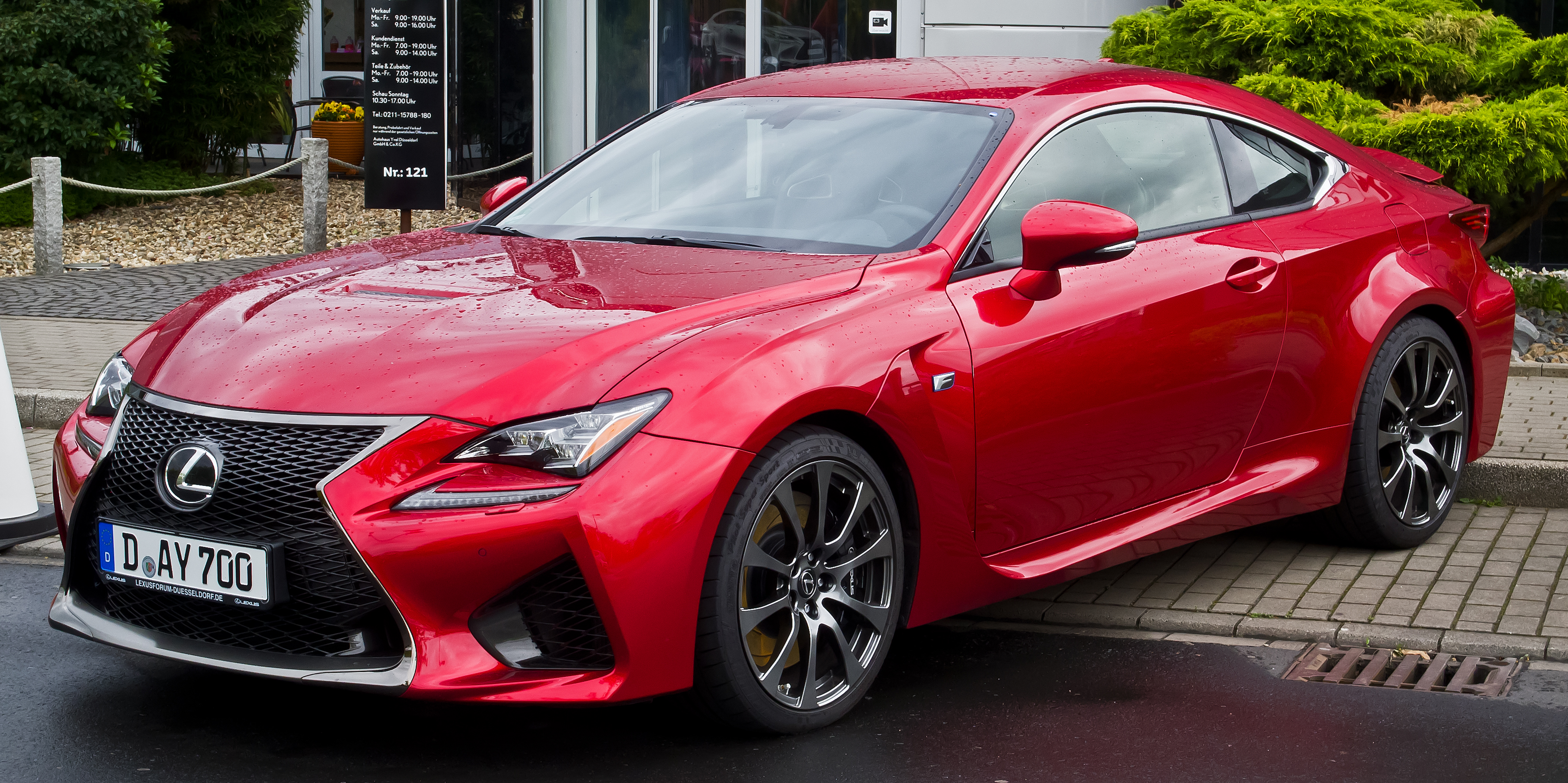
Lexus RC F

The Lexus RC F introduced a new 5.0 L V8 engine with 32-valves developed for the RC F. Rated at 467 bhp (473 PS; 348 kW) and 389 lb⋅ft (527 N⋅m) torque, it was the most powerful V8 that Lexus has built for use in a production car and is paired with a specially calibrated eight-speed Sports Direct Shift transmission.

=== Lexus GS F ===
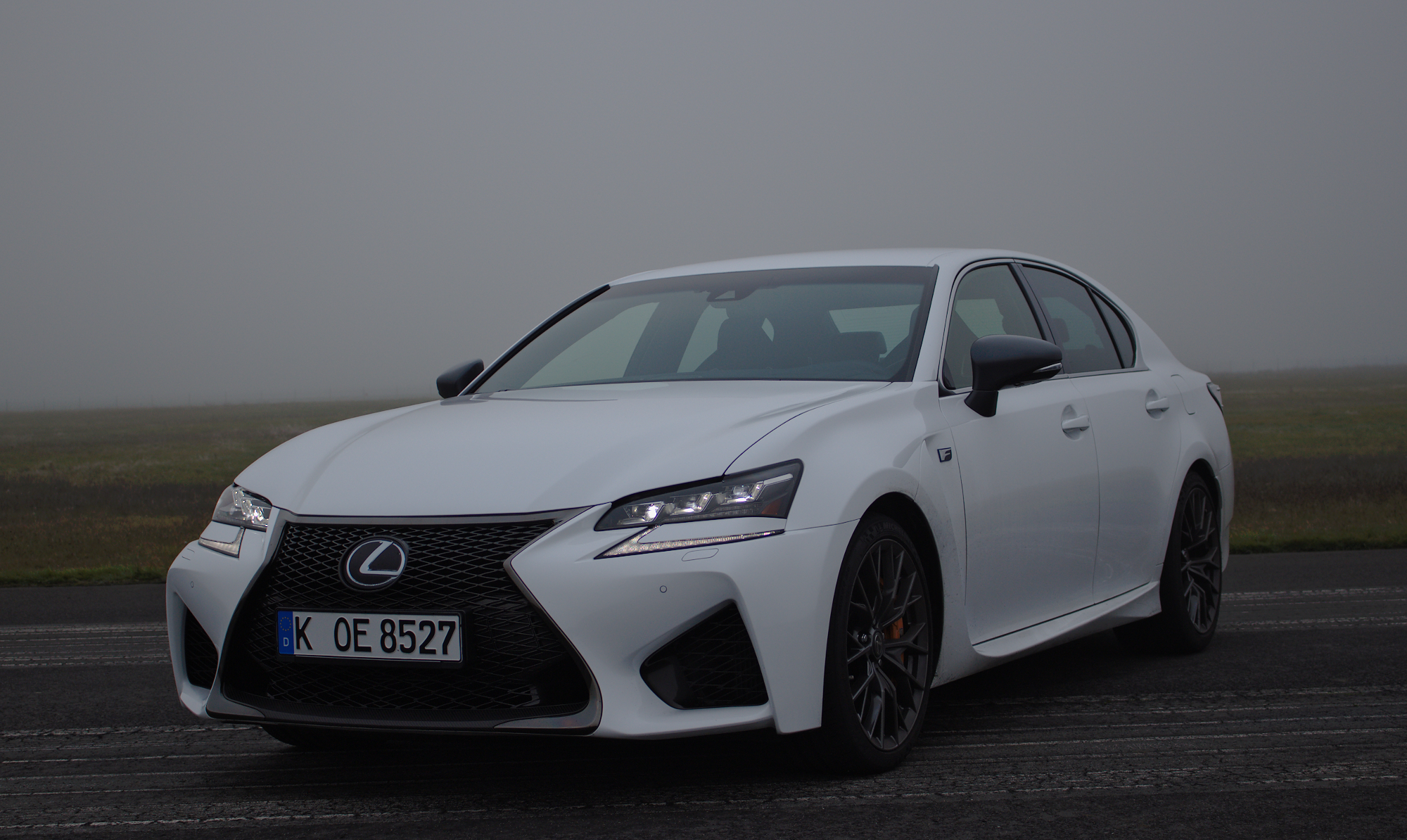

The Lexus GS F is a version of the Lexus GS, introduced at the 2016 Detroit Auto Show. It has the 5.0 L V8 first included in the Lexus RC F.

== F Sport ==
Announced in 2007 at the Specialty Equipment Market Association show, the Lexus F Sport line for standard Lexus models debuted that year along with the IS F sports sedan. Initially offered as a lineup of performance accessories for the IS 250 and IS 350 sedans, in early 2009 F Sport expanded to the two-door IS C models, along with the entire GS line. Special edition factory-built F Sport IS 350 C models were announced in 2009, followed by factory-produced IS 250 F Sport and IS 350 F Sport models for 2010 globally outside of the US and then in 2011 for the US market.

Factory-produced F Sport models feature interior and exterior upgrades and can be differentiated visually by the F Sport badging, mesh grille, and spoiler. F Sport parts are produced in conjunction with Toyota Racing Development and included performance enhancements such as brake upgrades, stabilizer bars, lowering springs, Bilstein shocks, F Sport clutch, carbon fiber engine covers, and chassis braces. Personalization parts included rear spoilers, exhaust kits, and alloy wheels.

F Sport models have included the following (factory package) models: Lexus IS 250 F Sport (2010), Lexus IS 250 F Sport AWD (2010), Lexus IS 350 F Sport (2010), Lexus IS 350 F Sport AWD (2010), Lexus IS 250 C F Sport (2010), Lexus IS 350 C F Sport (2010), Lexus LS 460 F Sport, Lexus LS 600h F Sport, and Lexus CT 200h F Sport (2011). Also included models (accessory line): Lexus IS 250 (2007), Lexus IS 350 (2007), Lexus IS 250 C (2009), Lexus IS 350 C (2009), Lexus IS 250 AWD (2009), Lexus GS 350 (2009), Lexus GS 350 AWD (2009), and Lexus CT 200h (2011). A limited production model (special edition) also has been built: Lexus IS 350 C F Sport (2009). Additional F Sport models have been added, including the GS 250 F Sport, GS 350 F Sport, RX 350 F Sport, NX 200T F SPORT, NX 300 F SPORT, ES 350 F SPORT (2019), UX 250H F SPORT (2019) and UX 200 F SPORT (2019) models.

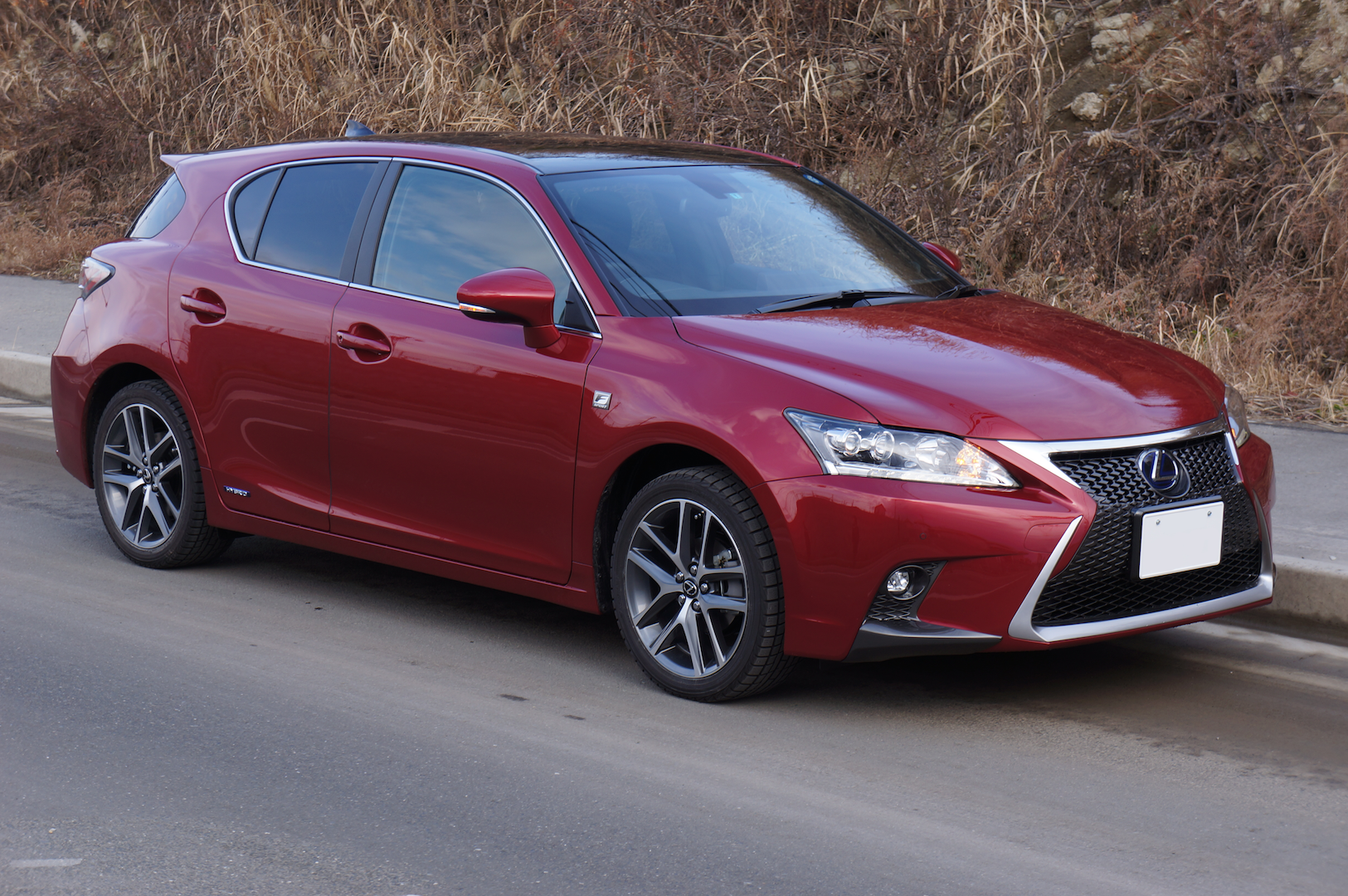
Lexus CT 200h F Sport

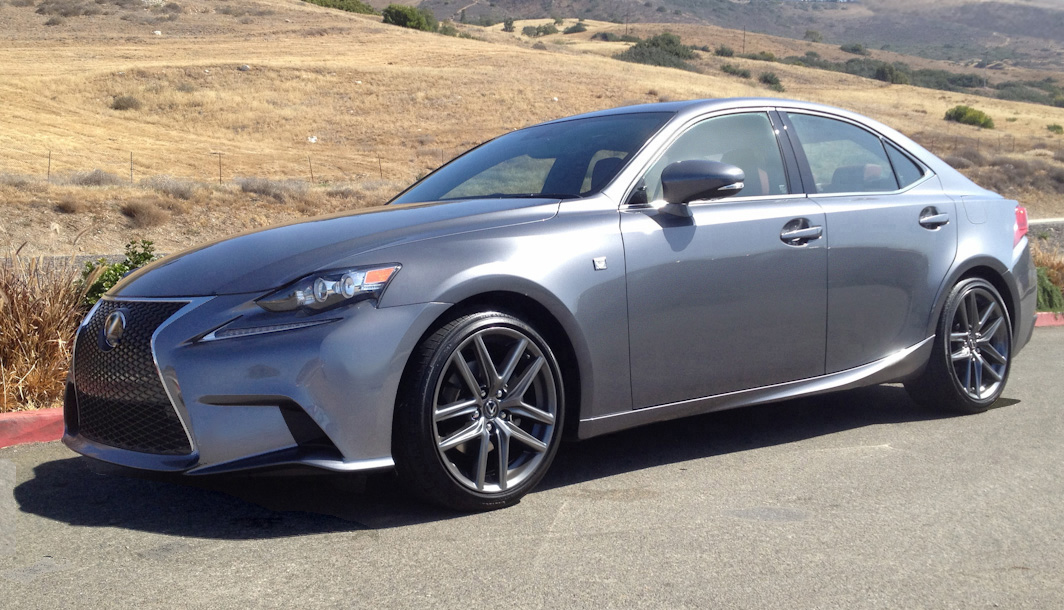
Lexus IS 250 F Sport

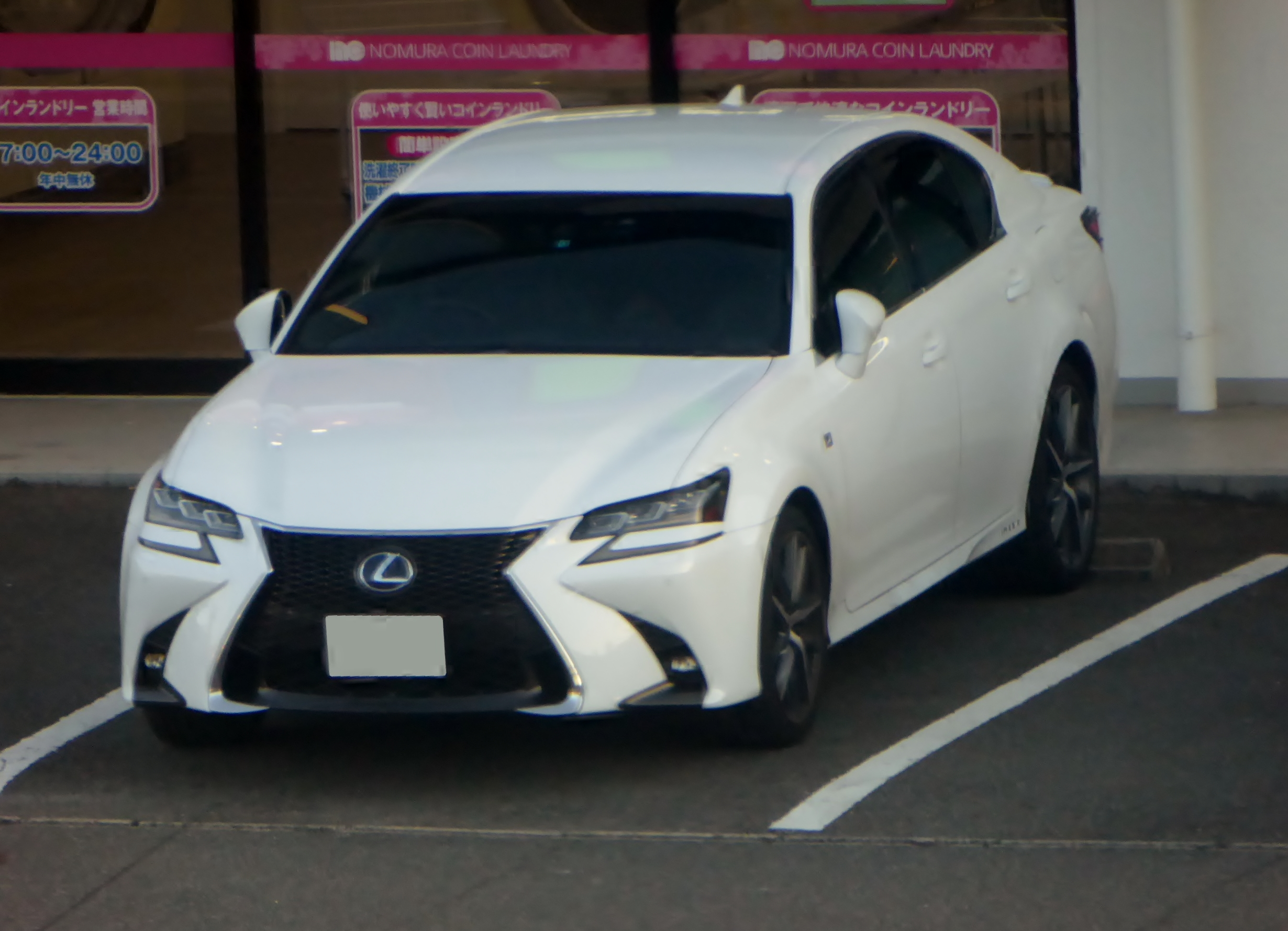
Lexus GS 450h F Sport

=== F Sport Performance ===
Introduced in 2021 with the release of the IS 500 F Sport Performance, the F Sport Performance line offers a higher level of performance than other F Sport models, but without the wider body, interior appointments such as sport bucket seats, nor extensively upgraded and tuned brakes, suspension, and chassis of the full-fledged F marque models. In the IS 500 F Sport Performance, this was developed to include the same 5.0 L (4,969 cc) 2UR-GSE engine offered in the IS F, RC F, GS F, and LC 500, but with a standard-width IS model body with raised hood bulge and stacked quad exhaust tips. It also includes Yamaha rear performance dampers, F Sport–tuned Adaptive Variable Suspension, two-piece aluminum 14.0-in front and 12.7-in rear brake rotors, dark chrome window trim, F Sport Performance front door-sill scuff plates, IS 500 startup animation in multi-information display, and F Sport Performance 19-in staggered-width split-10-spoke Enkei alloy wheels, with optional 19-in split-seven-spoke forged alloy Matte Black BBS wheels.

== Racing ==
Since their debut, Lexus F models have been their manufacturer's primary entrant in racing competitions. The LF-A prototype has competed on the Nürburgring since 2008 in VLN endurance races in partnership with Gazoo Racing and in the 24 Hours Nürburgring, also with the IS F. In 2010, an IS F won a class victory in VLN four-hour endurance competition. Also that year, two LFAs raced in the 2010 24 Hours of Nürburgring in the SP8 class over 4000cc which required a minimum weight of 1500 kg, a restrictor diameter of 34.2 mm, and a fuel tank size of 120 liters; the #50 LFA car won its class. The IS F has also been entered in the Superstars Series production-based touring car racing championship. Lexus currently runs the RC F in IMSA competitions.

== See also ==
- Lexus, history of
- Lexus in motorsport
- Lexus marque
- Lexus LF
- Lexus IS
- Lexus GS
- Lexus RC
- TOM'S
