= Lexus LF-Gh =

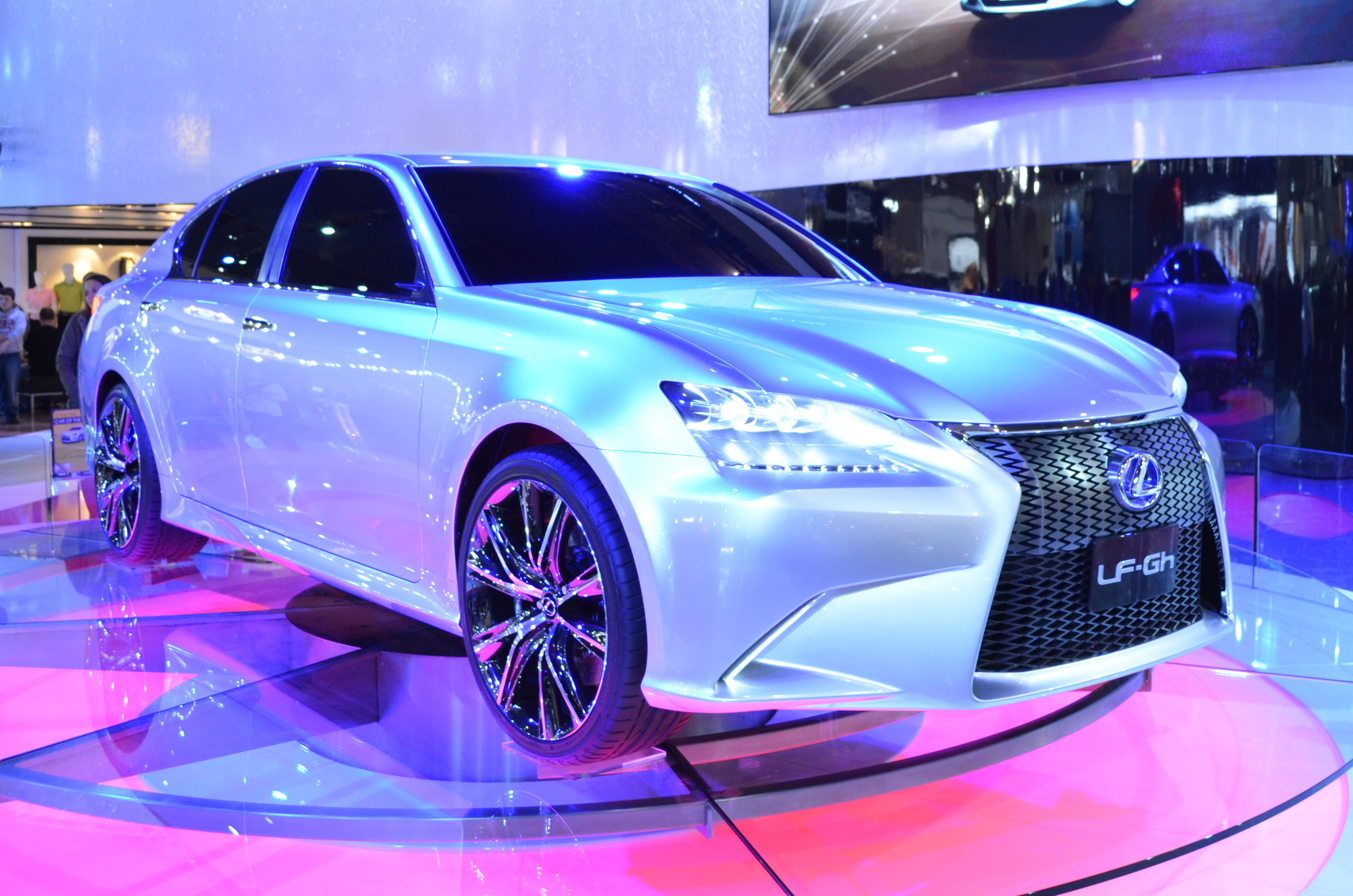

Overview
- Manufacturer: Lexus
- Production: 2011
- Designer: Kengo Matsumoto

Body and chassis
- Class: Mid-size concept car
- Body style: 4-door sedan
- Layout: Rear-wheel drive

Powertrain
- Engine: Lexus hybrid drive

Dimensions
- Wheelbase: 112.2 in (2,850 mm)
- Length: 192.5 in (4,890 mm)
- Width: 73.6 in (1,870 mm)
- Height: 57.1 in (1,450 mm)

The Lexus LF-Gh ("Lexus Future Grand-touring Hybrid") is an LF concept vehicle by Lexus which debuted at the 2011 New York International Auto Show. The LF-Gh is a rear-wheel-drive hybrid platform powered by a Lexus Hybrid Drive powertrain. The LF-Gh also provide a hint of what future Lexus models, mainly the Lexus GS which was scheduled for late 2011, might look like. The front and the back of the LF-Gh is equipped with LED headlights, daytime running lights, and taillights. To improve aerodynamics the LF-Gh's door handles are sealed into the door panel and could be pushed to open out. the large spindle grille on the front of the LF-Gh brings out the aggressiveness of the design.

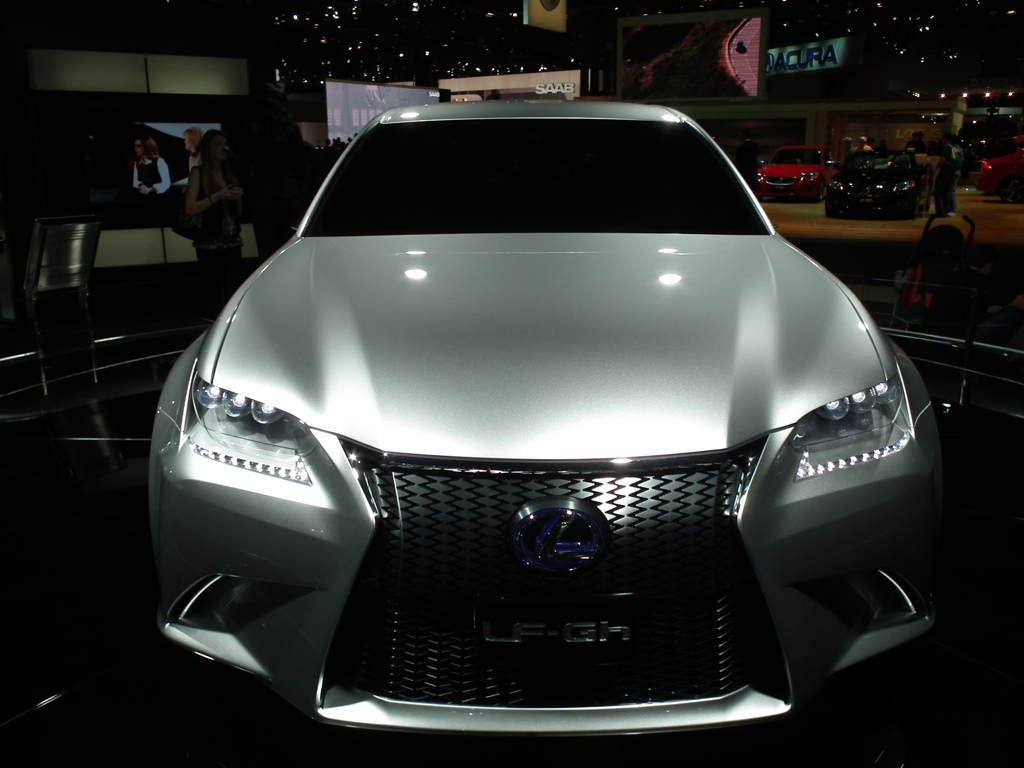
LF-Gh at the New York Auto Show

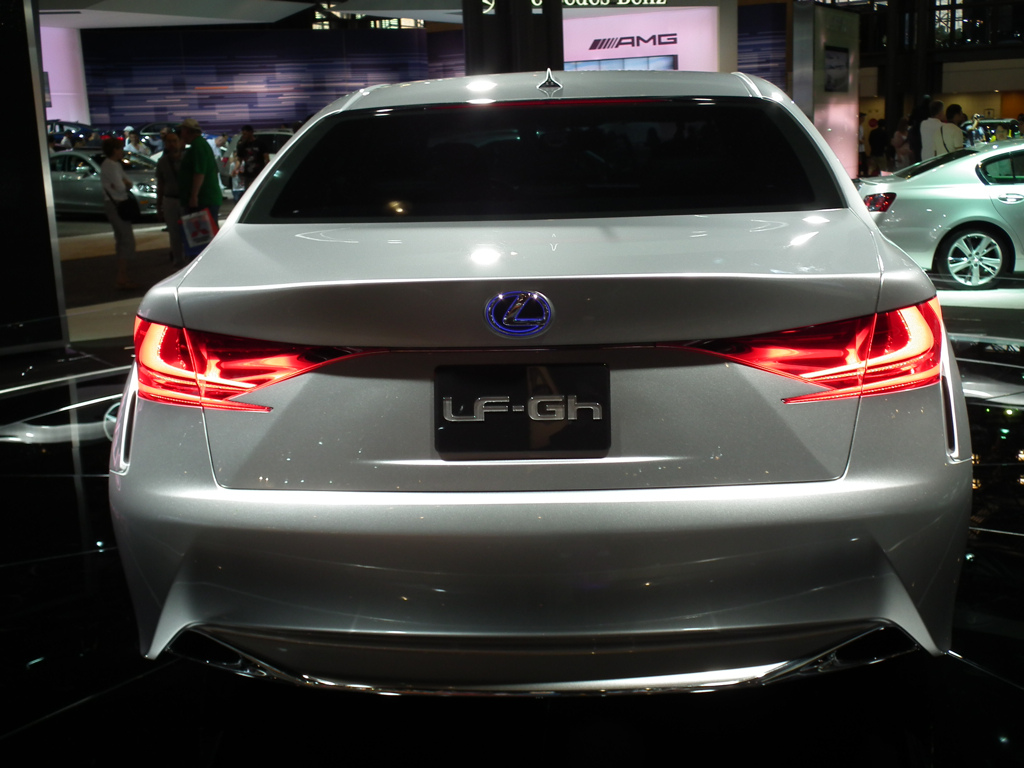
LF-Gh rear view
