= Lexus UX =

Subcompact luxury crossover SUV

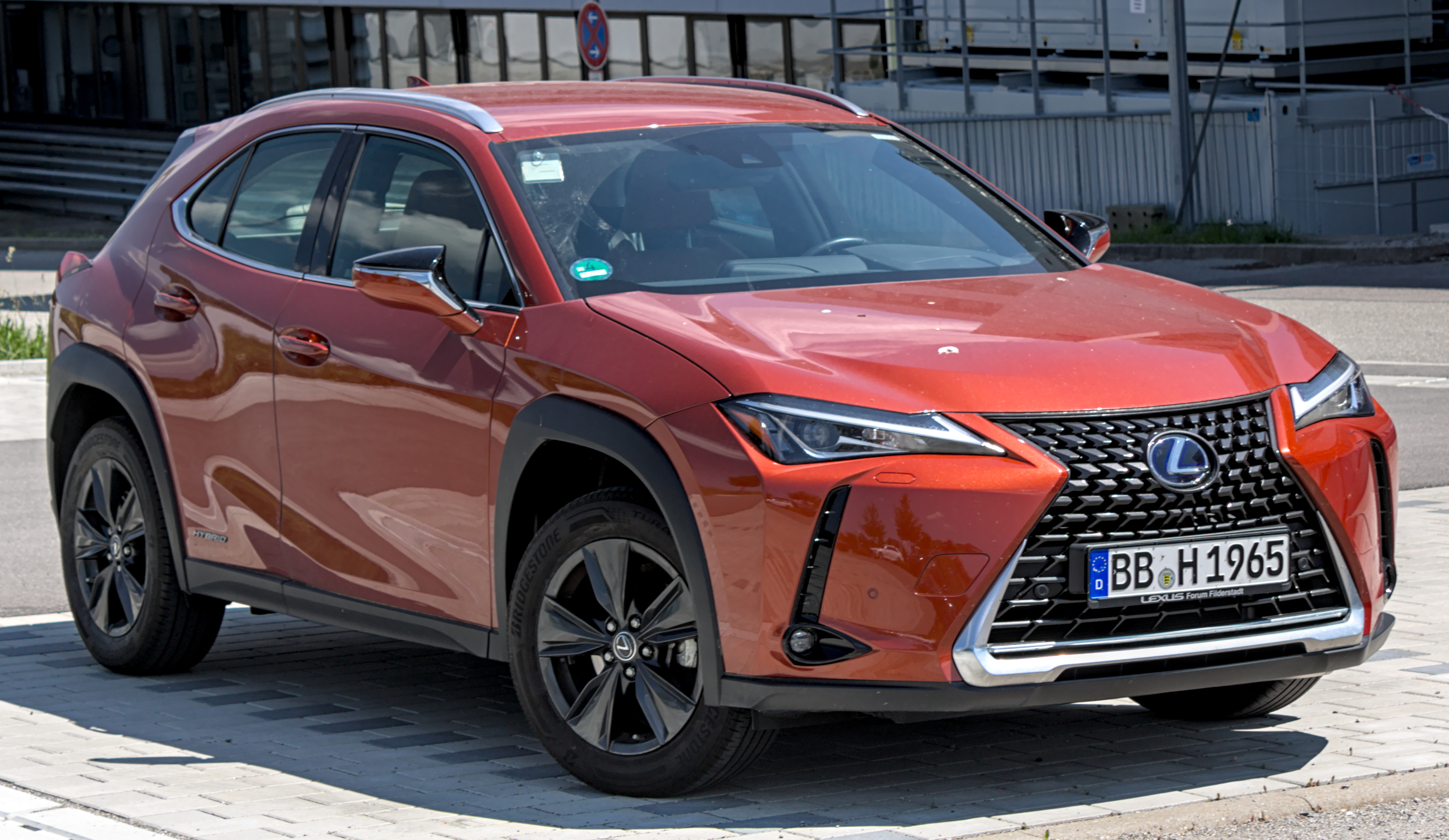
- 2020 Lexus UX 250h (MZAH10, Germany)

Overview
- Manufacturer: Toyota
- Model code: ZA10
- Production: December 2018 – present
- Model years: 2019–present
- Assembly: Japan: Miyawaka, Fukuoka (Toyota Motor Kyushu)
- Designer: Tetsuo Miki, Hideaki Iida, Nobuyuki Tomatsu, Shunsuke Sudo and Tatsuya Iwai

Body and chassis
- Class: Subcompact luxury crossover SUV
- Body style: 5-door SUV
- Layout: Front-engine, front-wheel-drive; Front-engine, four-wheel-drive; Front-motor, front-wheel-drive (UX 300e)
- Platform: TNGA: GA-C
- Related: Toyota C-HR (AX10/50); Toyota Corolla Cross; Toyota Corolla (E210)

Powertrain
- Engine: Petrol: 2.0 L M20A-FKS I4 (UX 200; MZAA10); Petrol hybrid; 2.0 L M20A-FXS I4 (UX 250h/260h; MZAH10/15)
- Electric motor: 80 kW (107 hp; 109 PS) 3NM synchronous (UX 250h/260h); 150 kW (201 hp; 204 PS) 4KM synchronous (UX 300e; KMA10)
- Power output: 125 kW (168 hp; 170 PS) (UX 200); 107 kW (143 hp; 145 PS) (UX 250h/260h, petrol engine only); 135 kW (181 hp; 184 PS) (UX 250h/260h, combined system output)
- Transmission: K120 CVT with physical first gear (UX 200); eCVT (UX 250h/260h); Single-speed automatic (UX 300e)
- Hybrid drivetrain: Power-split hybrid (UX 250h/260h)
- Battery: 1.4 kWh, 216 V sealed Nickel-metal hydride (UX 250h/260h); 54.3–72.8 kWh, 355.2 V lithium-ion (UX 300e)
- Electric range: 400 km (249 miles) (UX 300e, NEDC); 299 km (186 miles) (UX 300e, WLTP)
- Plug-in charging: 6.6 kW AC, 50 kW DC (UX 300e)

Dimensions
- Wheelbase: 2,640 mm (103.9 in)
- Length: 4,495 mm (177.0 in)
- Width: 1,840 mm (72.4 in)
- Height: 1,520–1,540 mm (59.8–60.6 in)
- Curb weight: 1,470–1,540 kg (3,241–3,395 lb) (UX 200); 1,550–1,640 kg (3,417–3,616 lb) (UX 250h/260h); 1,900 kg (4,189 lb) (UX 300e)

The Lexus UX (Japanese: レクサス・UX, Hepburn: Rekusasu UX) is a subcompact luxury crossover SUV from Lexus, the luxury division of Toyota. It was introduced at the March 2018 Geneva Motor Show as the smallest crossover model in Lexus' lineup prior to the introduction of LBX in 2023; since 2024, it is currently slotted between the smaller LBX and the larger NX. It is also the first Lexus model based on the same GA-C platform shared with the E210 series Toyota Corolla, as well as the Toyota C-HR and Toyota Corolla Cross. The "UX" name stands for "Urban Explorer".

Prior to the 2022 facelift for the 2023 model year, the UX came equipped with Lexus Safety System+ 2.0 as standard equipment, after which the standard equipment was upgraded to Lexus Safety System+ 2.5.

== Variants ==
=== UX 200 ===
The UX 200 is powered by a 2.0 L M20A-FKS I4 petrol engine mated with a Direct Shift continuously variable transmission/CVT and front-wheel drive only configuration.

=== UX 250h/260h/300h ===
The UX 250h (sold in China as the UX 260h, and in the United States and Australia as the UX 300h) is powered by a 2.0 L M20A-FXS I4 petrol hybrid engine mated with an eCVT. It is available in both front-wheel drive or E-Four all-wheel drive system. The hybrid system uses a 1.4 kWh nickel-metal hydride battery.

=== UX 300e ===
In 2019, at the Guangzhou International Automobile Exhibition, Lexus unveiled the UX 300e, their first battery electric vehicle. The UX 300e is a battery electric variant of the UX, which has a claimed electric range of 400 km (249 miles) on the NEDC test cycle or 299 km (186 miles) on the WLTP test cycle. It uses a 54.3 kWh lithium ion battery.

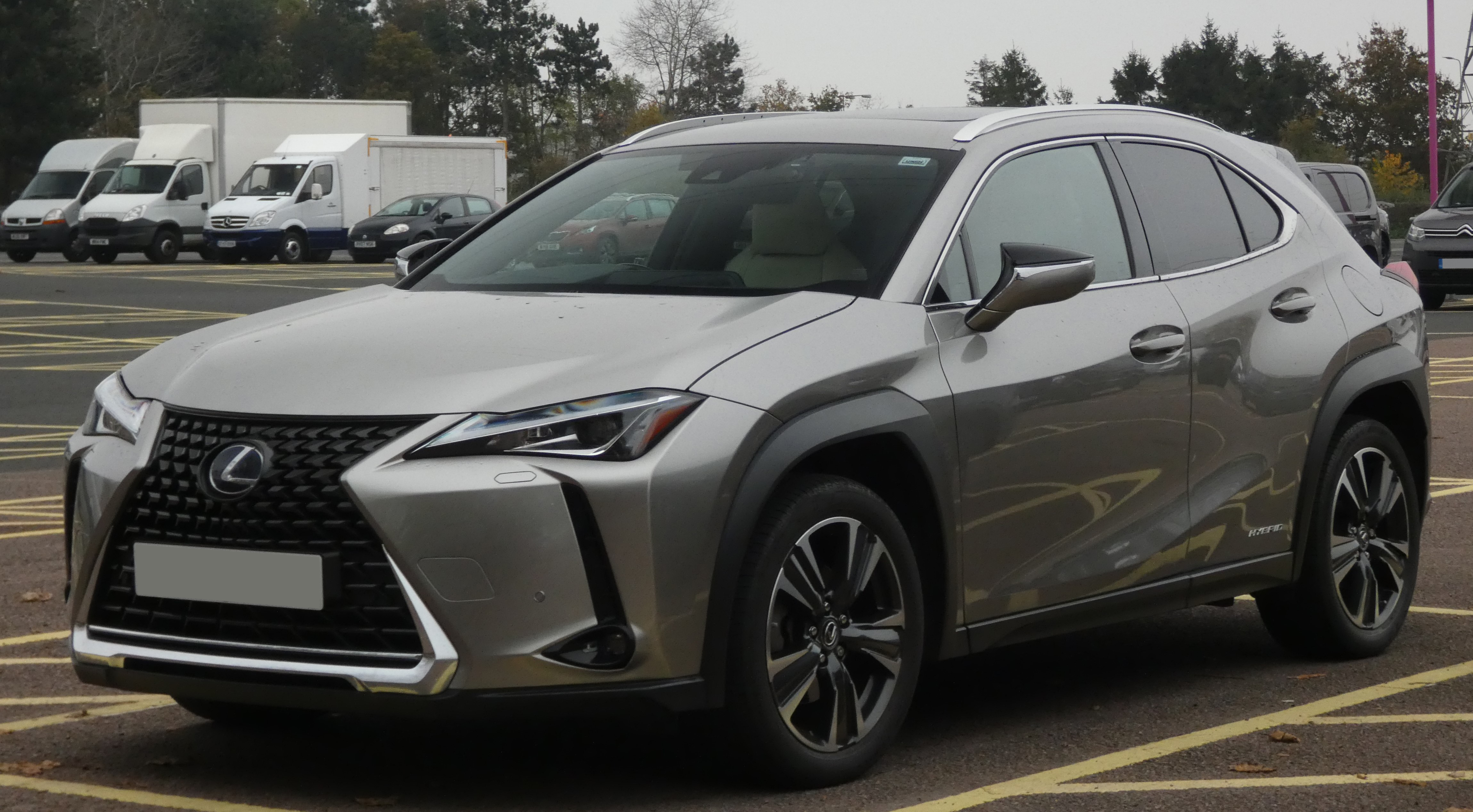
2019 UX 250h (MZAH10, UK)

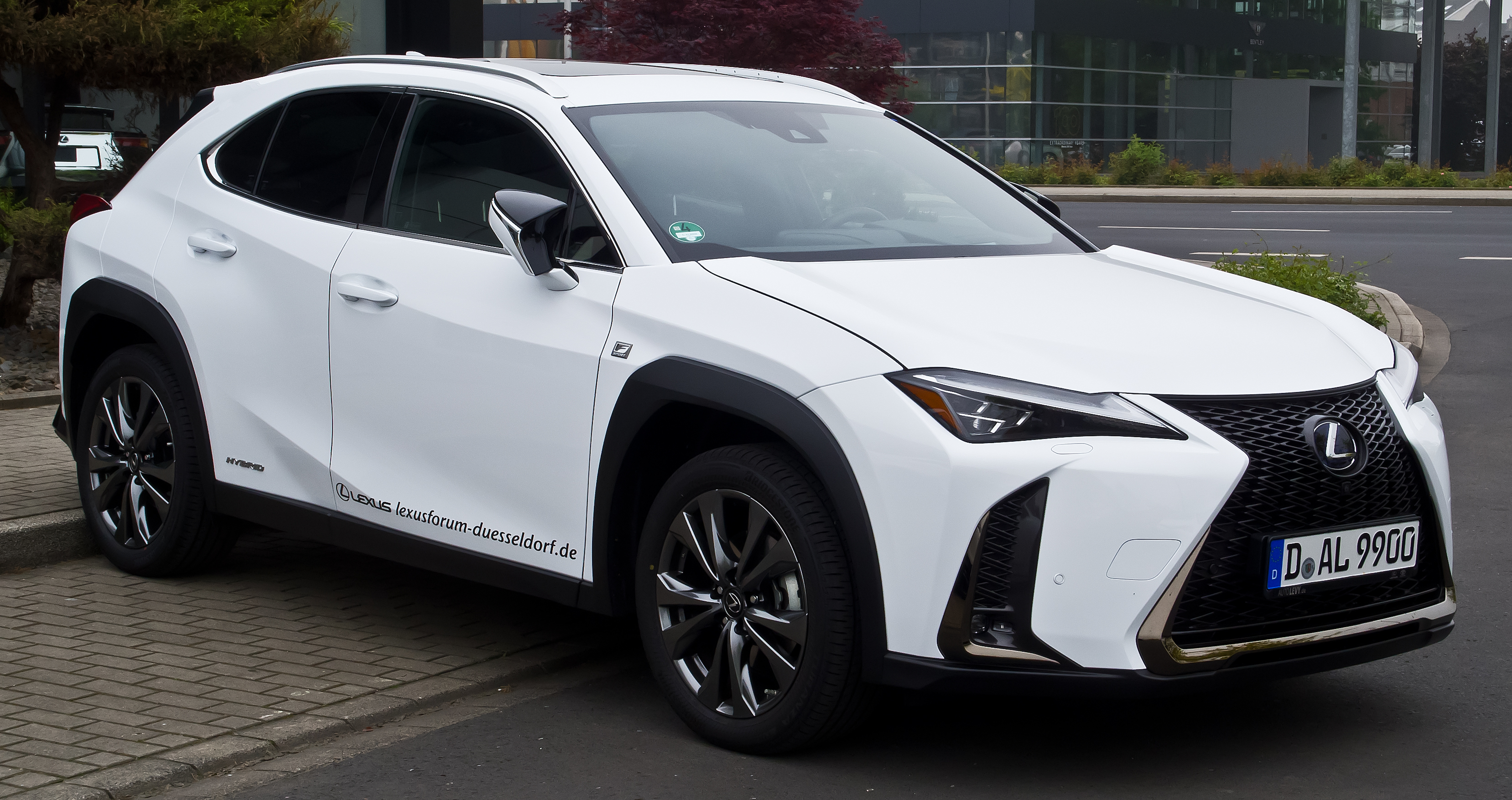
2020 UX F Sport (MZAH10, Germany)

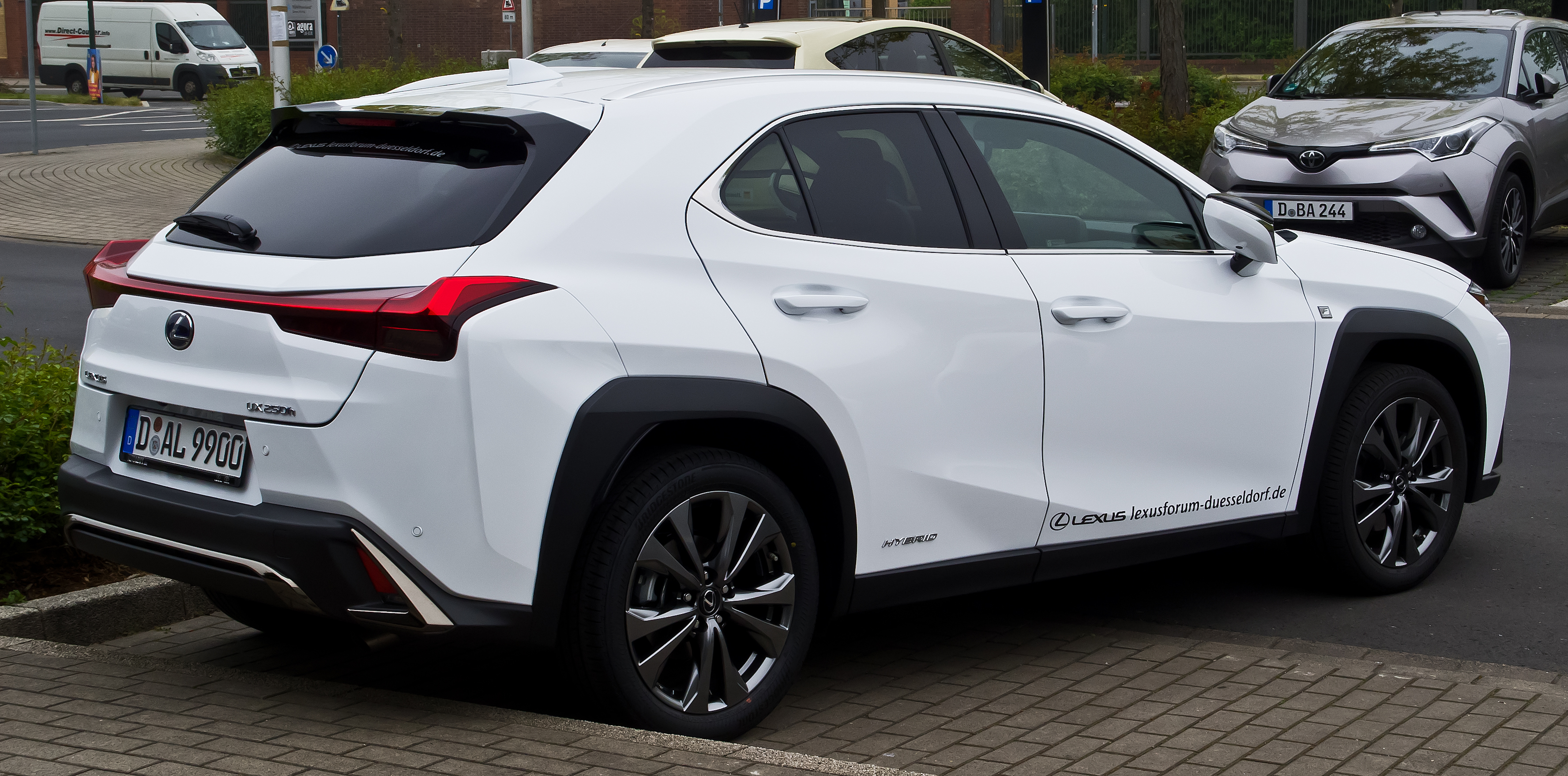
2019 UX 250h F Sport (MZAH10, Germany)

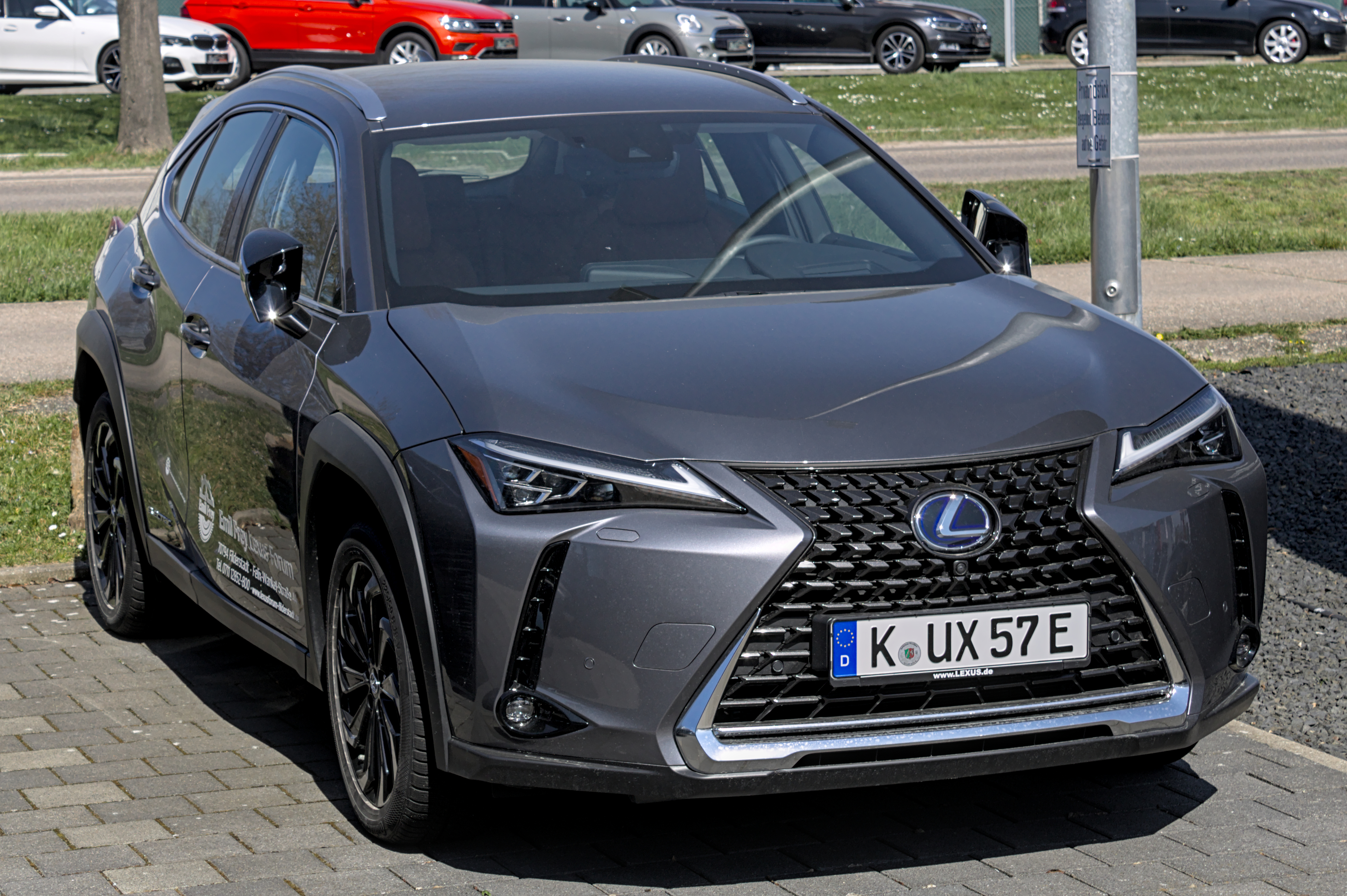
2021 UX 300e

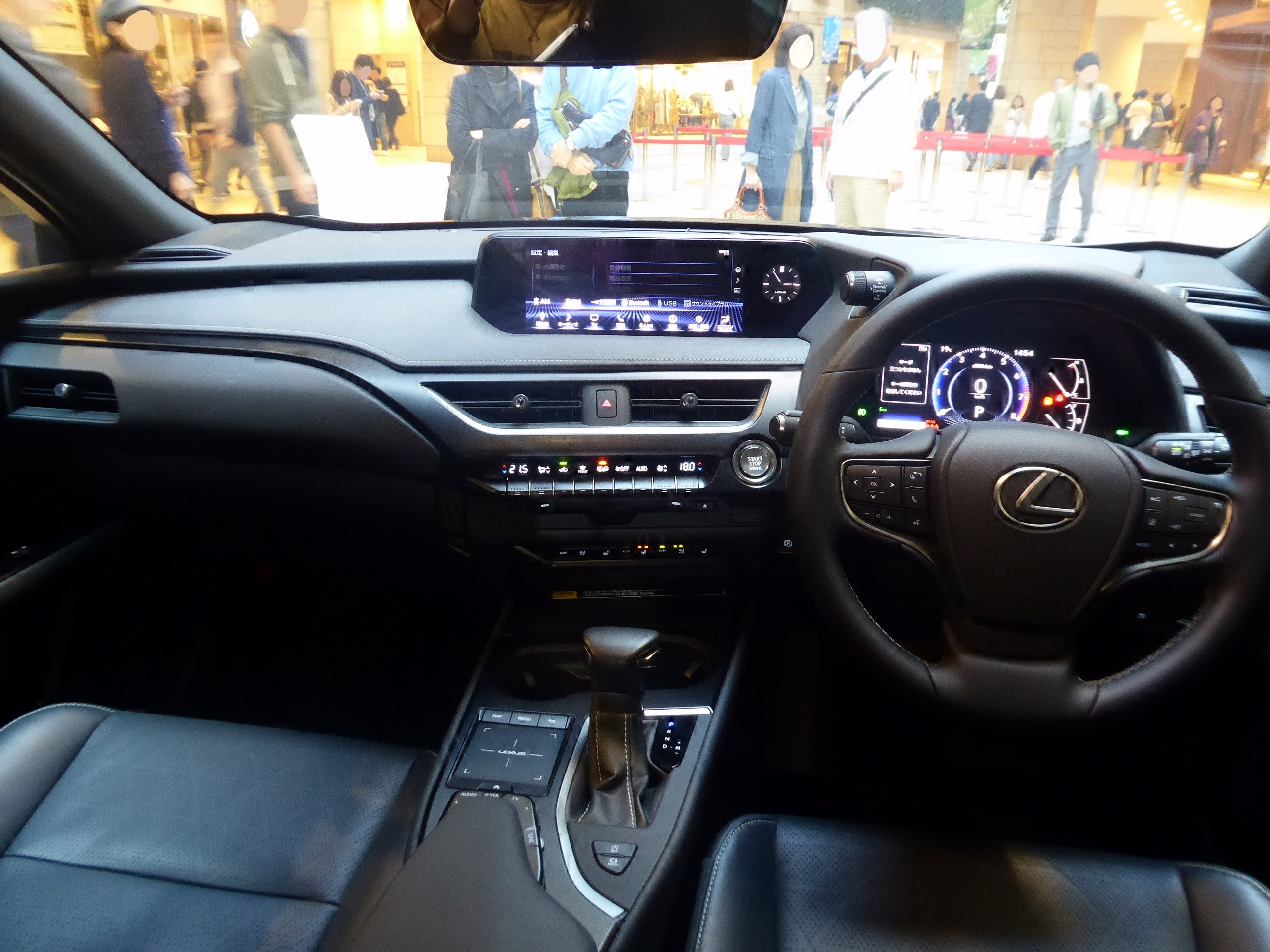
Interior

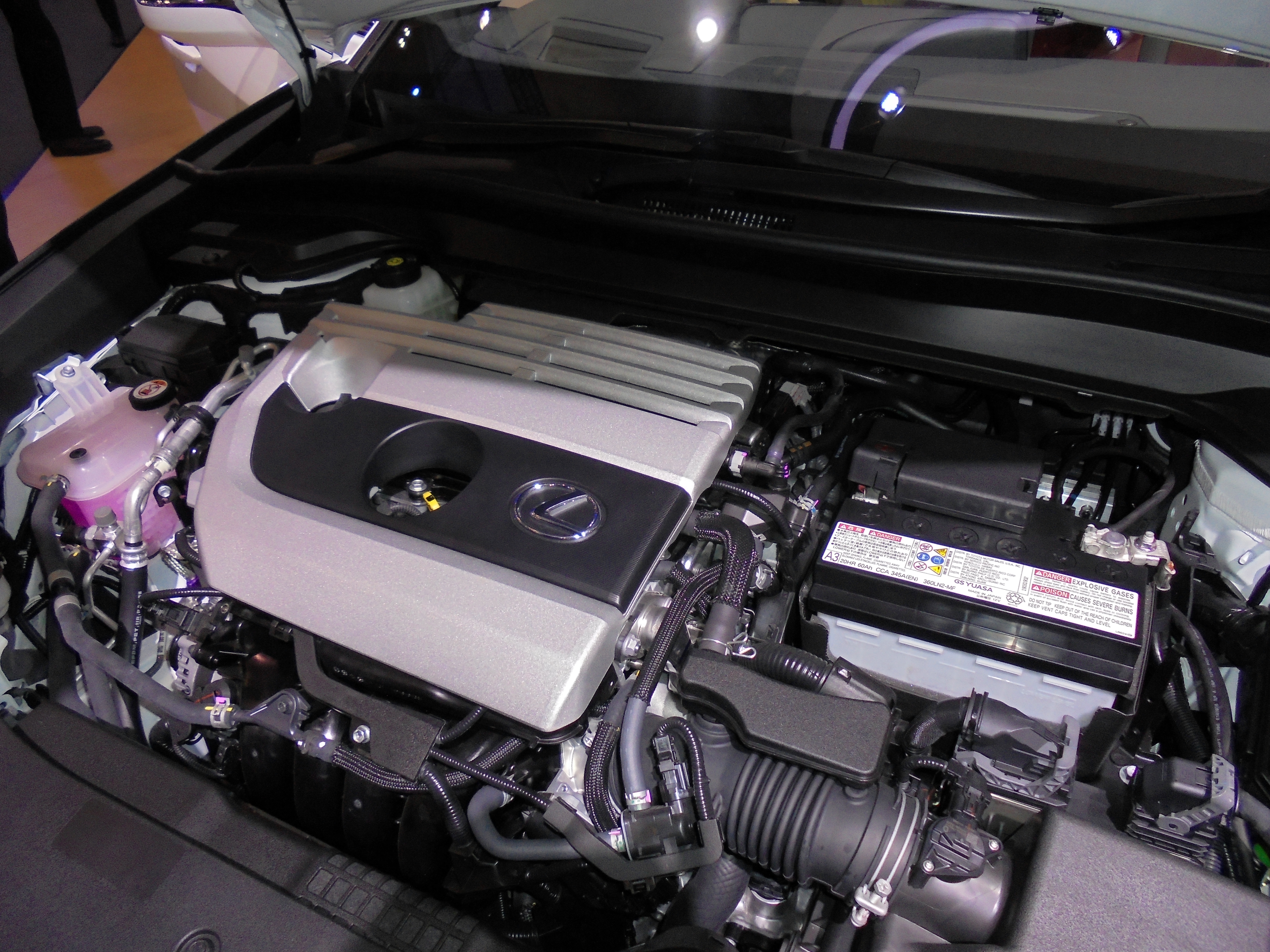
M20A-FKS engine in the UX 200

== Production ==
For the North American market, production of the UX started in the fourth quarter of 2018 and sales commenced in December 2018 for the 2019 model year.

In 2022, for the 2023 model year, an update added wireless support for Apple CarPlay and Android Auto along with an 8 or 12.3 screen with higher quality. A digital key was added that is used through the mobile phone, the touchpad was removed, a larger wireless cell phone charging space was added along with ambient lights.

== Markets ==
The UX is a global model and introduced in 80 countries worldwide.

=== North America ===
==== United States ====
The UX is the first Lexus to be offered through their new "Complete Lease" program, which includes insurance and maintenance. It was launched in December 2018. The UX is exclusively offered as a hybrid vehicle for the 2023 model year.

=== Asia ===
The UX made its Asian debut at the August 2018 Gaikindo Indonesia International Auto Show.

==== Southeast Asia ====
The UX was previewed in Malaysia during the 2018 Kuala Lumpur International Motor Show and was launched in 2020. then was launched in Singapore at the 2019 Singapore Motor Show and was launched in Thailand in March 2019.

=== Europe ===
European sales began in October 2018.

=== Australia ===
Australian sales began in the first quarter of 2019.

== Specifications ==
ICE models
Type	Model	ICE Engine			Electric motor(s)			System output	Model code	Top speed	0–100 km/h (0–62 mph)	Trans.	Layout	Cal. years
Type	Model	Engine code	Displ.	Output	Electric motor	Battery	Output	System output	Model code	Top speed	0–100 km/h (0–62 mph)	Trans.	Layout	Cal. years
Petrol	UX 200	M20A-FKS	1,987 cc (2.0 L) I4	171 hp (128 kW; 173 PS) at 6,600 rpm / 205 N⋅m (20.9 kg⋅m; 151 lb⋅ft) at 4,800 rpm	n/a	n/a	n/a	171 hp (128 kW; 173 PS) at 6,600 rpm / 205 N⋅m (20.9 kg⋅m; 151 lb⋅ft) at 4,800 rpm	MZAA10	190 km/h (120 mph)	9.2 sec	D-CVT	FWD	2019-2022
Petrol hybrid	UX 250h/260h	M20A-FXS	1,987 cc (2.0 L) I4	146 hp (109 kW; 148 PS) at 6,000 rpm / 180 N⋅m (18.4 kg⋅m; 133 lb⋅ft) at 4,400 rpm 150 hp (112 kW; 152 PS) at 6,000 rpm / 190 N⋅m (19.4 kg⋅m; 140 lb⋅ft) at 4,400-5,200 rpm	Synchronous motor(s)	1.4 kW⋅h, 216 V nickel-metal hydride	Front Motor : 109 hp (81 kW; 111 PS) / 202 N⋅m (20.6 kg⋅m; 149 lb⋅ft) Front Motor : 109 hp (81 kW; 111 PS) / 202 N⋅m (20.6 kg⋅m; 149 lb⋅ft) Rear Motor : 7.1 hp (5.3 kW) / 55 N⋅m (5.61 kg⋅m; 40.6 lb⋅ft)	177 hp (132 kW; 179 PS) / 188 N⋅m (19.2 kg⋅m; 139 lb⋅ft)	MZAH10	177 km/h (110 mph)	8.5 sec	eCVT	FWD	2019-2024
Petrol hybrid	UX 250h/260h	M20A-FXS	1,987 cc (2.0 L) I4	146 hp (109 kW; 148 PS) at 6,000 rpm / 180 N⋅m (18.4 kg⋅m; 133 lb⋅ft) at 4,400 rpm 150 hp (112 kW; 152 PS) at 6,000 rpm / 190 N⋅m (19.4 kg⋅m; 140 lb⋅ft) at 4,400-5,200 rpm	Synchronous motor(s)	1.4 kW⋅h, 216 V nickel-metal hydride	Front Motor : 109 hp (81 kW; 111 PS) / 202 N⋅m (20.6 kg⋅m; 149 lb⋅ft) Front Motor : 109 hp (81 kW; 111 PS) / 202 N⋅m (20.6 kg⋅m; 149 lb⋅ft) Rear Motor : 7.1 hp (5.3 kW) / 55 N⋅m (5.61 kg⋅m; 40.6 lb⋅ft)	177 hp (132 kW; 179 PS) / 188 N⋅m (19.2 kg⋅m; 139 lb⋅ft)	MZAH15	177 km/h (110 mph)	8.5 sec	eCVT	AWD	2019-2024
Petrol hybrid	UX 300h	M20A-FXS	1,987 cc (2.0 L) I4	146 hp (109 kW; 148 PS) at 6,000 rpm / 180 N⋅m (18.4 kg⋅m; 133 lb⋅ft) at 4,400 rpm 150 hp (112 kW; 152 PS) at 6,000 rpm / 190 N⋅m (19.4 kg⋅m; 140 lb⋅ft) at 4,400-5,200 rpm	Synchronous motor(s)	1.4 kW⋅h, 222 V lithium-ion	Front Motor : 111 hp (83 kW; 113 PS) / 202 N⋅m (20.6 kg⋅m; 149 lb⋅ft)	196 hp (145 kW) / 139 lb-ft (188 Nm)	MZAH11	177 km/h (110 mph)	8.1 sec	eCVT	FWD	2024-present
Petrol hybrid	UX 300h	M20A-FXS	1,987 cc (2.0 L) I4	146 hp (109 kW; 148 PS) at 6,000 rpm / 180 N⋅m (18.4 kg⋅m; 133 lb⋅ft) at 4,400 rpm 150 hp (112 kW; 152 PS) at 6,000 rpm / 190 N⋅m (19.4 kg⋅m; 140 lb⋅ft) at 4,400-5,200 rpm	Synchronous motor(s)	1.4 kW⋅h, 222 V lithium-ion	Front Motor : 111 hp (83 kW; 113 PS) / 206 N⋅m (21.0 kg⋅m; 152 lb⋅ft) Rear Motor : 41 hp (31 kW; 42 PS) / 84 N⋅m (8.57 kg⋅m; 62.0 lb⋅ft)	196 hp (145 kW) / 139 lb-ft (188 Nm)	MZAH16	177 km/h (110 mph)	7.9 sec	eCVT	AWD	2024-present

BEV models
Type	Model	Electric motor	Battery	Range	Power	Torque	Model code	Top speed	0–100 km/h (0–62 mph)	Trans.	Layout	Cal. years
Battery electric	UX 300e	'4KM' synchronous motor	54.3 (45 usable) kW⋅h, 355.2 V lithium-ion	299 km (186 mi)^{WLTP} 400 km (250 mi)^{NEDC}	204 hp (152 kW; 207 PS)	300 N⋅m (30.6 kg⋅m; 221 lb⋅ft)	KMA10	160 km/h (99 mph)	7.5 sec	Single-speed automatic	FWD	2019-2023
Battery electric	UX 300e	'4KM' synchronous motor	72.8 (64 usable) kW⋅h, 355.2 V lithium-ion	450 km (280 mi)^{WLTP} 560 km (350 mi)^{NEDC}	204 hp (152 kW; 207 PS)	300 N⋅m (30.6 kg⋅m; 221 lb⋅ft)	KMA10	160 km/h (99 mph)	7.5 sec	Single-speed automatic	FWD	2023-2025

In 2023, for the 2024 model year, the UX 300e received a technical update, which included a change in battery pack and range.

== Safety ==
NHTSA 2017
Overall	5/5 stars
Frontal, driver	5/4 stars
Frontal, passenger	5/4 stars
Side, driver	5/4 stars
Side, passenger	5/5 stars
Side pole, driver	5/5 stars
Rollover	/ 14%

Euro NCAP test results* Lexus UX (2019)
Test	Points	%
Overall:	5 /5 stars	
Adult occupant:	36.7	96%
Child occupant:	43.1	88%
Pedestrian:	39.4	82%
Safety assist:	10.8	83%

ANCAP test results* Lexus UX (2019, aligned with Euro NCAP)
Test	Points	%
Overall:	5 /5 stars	
Adult occupant:	36.6	96%
Child occupant:	43.1	88%
Pedestrian:	39.4	82%
Safety assist:	10.8	83%

IIHS Lexus UX:
Category	Rating
Small overlap frontal offset (Driver)	Good
Small overlap frontal offset (Passenger)	Good
Moderate overlap frontal offset	Good
Side impact (original test)	Good
Roof strength	Good
Head restraints and seats	Good
Headlights	Good / Poor / Acceptable (depending on trim/options)
Front crash prevention (Vehicle-to-Vehicle)	Superior
Front crash prevention (Vehicle-to-Pedestrian, day)	Superior
Child seat anchors (LATCH) ease of use	Good

== Sales ==
Year	Japan sales (EV)	US sales (hybrid)	Canada sales	Europe sales (hybrid; EV)	China sales
2018		453 (66)			
2019		16,725 (8,603)	2,683	20,943 (19,056)	
2020		16,962 (11,818)	2,520	16,850 (15,751)	
2021		17,581 (12,672)	3,284	21,144 (17,261; 2,987)	
2022	5,005 (272)	10,237 (6,884)		14,559 (12,450; 1,519)	
2023	11,194 (259)	11,846 (11,844)		18,747 (17,250; 761)	4,254
2024	5,194 (122)	8,877 (8,877)		10,959 (8,841; 1,860)	1,855
2025		8,421 (8,421)			106
