= Lexus LBX =

Subcompact luxury crossover SUV

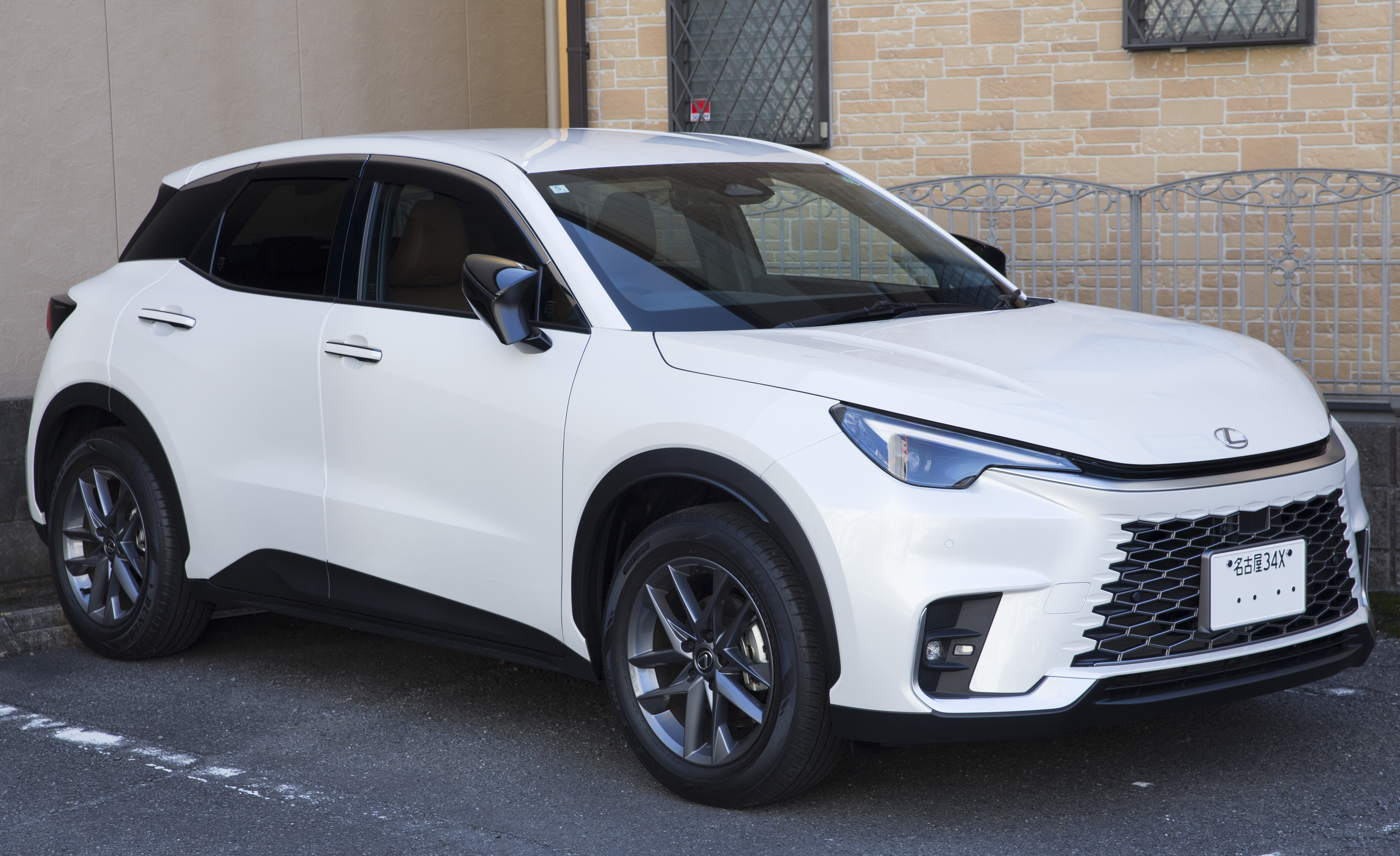

Overview
- Manufacturer: Toyota
- Model code: AY10
- Production: December 2023 – present
- Model years: 2024–present
- Assembly: Japan: Kanegasaki, Iwate (TMEJ)

Body and chassis
- Class: Subcompact luxury crossover SUV (B)
- Body style: 5-door SUV
- Layout: Front-engine, front-wheel-drive; Front-engine, four-wheel-drive (E-four/Morizo RR)
- Platform: TNGA: GA-B
- Related: Toyota Yaris Cross (XP210); Toyota Yaris / GR Yaris (XP210); Toyota Aqua (XP210)

Powertrain
- Engine: Petrol hybrid: 1490 cc M15A-FXE I3; Petrol: 1618 cc G16E-GTS turbo I3 (Morizo RR)
- Electric motor: 69 kW (93 hp; 94 PS) 1VM AC synchronous (front, hybrid models); 5 kW (6.7 hp; 6.8 PS) 1MM AC synchronous (rear, hybrid models)
- Power output: 67 kW (90 hp; 91 PS) (M15A-FXE, petrol engine only); 100 kW (134 hp; 136 PS) (M15A-FXE, combined system output); 206–224 kW (276–300 hp; 280–305 PS) (G16E-GTS)
- Transmission: eCVT (hybrid models); 6-speed EA67F manual (Morizo RR); 8-speed "GR-DAT" automatic (Morizo RR)
- Hybrid drivetrain: Power-split
- Battery: 5-Ah nickel–metal hydride (hybrid models)

Dimensions
- Wheelbase: 2,580 mm (101.6 in)
- Length: 4,190 mm (165.0 in)
- Width: 1,825–1,840 mm (71.9–72.4 in)
- Height: 1,535–1,560 mm (60.4–61.4 in)
- Kerb weight: 1,280–1,480 kg (2,822–3,263 lb)

The Lexus LBX (Japanese: レクサス・LBX, Hepburn: Rekusasu LBX) is a subcompact luxury crossover SUV (B-segment) marketed by Lexus, a luxury division of Toyota. Primarily developed for Europe and Japan, it was introduced in June 2023 in Milan, Italy, as the smallest crossover model in Lexus' lineup, slotting below the C-segment UX. It is also the first Lexus model based on the Toyota TNGA-B platform, which is shared with the XP210 series Toyota Yaris Cross and the XP210 series Toyota Yaris. It entered production by the end of 2023 and went on sale in Europe along with additional markets in early 2024.

According to Lexus, the "LBX" name stands for "Lexus Breakthrough X(cross)-over". It is the second Lexus model with a three-letter name, following the LFA which was released in 2011. It is named LBX instead of BX to avoid trademark conflicts with Citroën which produced the BX in Europe from 1982 to 1994.

== Overview ==
The development of the LBX was led by chief engineer Kunihiko Endo. According to Endo, achieving the desired level of refinement in the LBX to keep up with Lexus standards was challenging, as they had to adopt a different approach to the traditional use of sound insulating materials. The LBX is equipped with a bi-polar nickel–metal hydride battery for its hybrid system. In comparison to a regular NiMH battery, the battery is lighter and more compact while allowing faster charging and discharging. As a result, the battery output can be maximised to capitalise on a larger electric motor than in the Yaris Cross.

At the front, the LBX is equipped with MacPherson struts, while the rear suspension features a torsion beam for front-wheel drive models and a double wishbone back axle for all-wheel drive variants. To enhance body control and stability, Lexus has incorporated Vehicle Braking Posture Control, a system that utilizes automatic braking to minimize pitching movements.

== Specifications ==
=== Body ===
The LBX is the first Lexus vehicle to use the front-wheel drive, B-segment based GA-B platform. Unlike other Lexus models, the LBX does not include Lexus’ iconic spindle grille, instead the grille is a singular trapezoid shape, similar to the style of the fifth-generation RX. The LBX follows Lexus’ "Resolute Look", which was introduced onto the Lexus LF-S in 2003 and has been featured as a design cue used on Lexus vehicles from the early 2000s. Following the design principle of the "Next Chapter Design", the front-pillars have been pulled back to make the cabin seem small.

The daytime running lamps and turn signals are integrated into bifunctional units. The L-shape face outward rather than inward to harmonise with the direction of the indicators.

Available wheels consist of either 17- or 18-inch. Available trims include Emotion, Cool, Elegant, and Relax. In Japan, the Cool is fitted with 20-inch wheels, while the Relax gets 18-inch wheels, and the Elegant has 17-inch wheels.

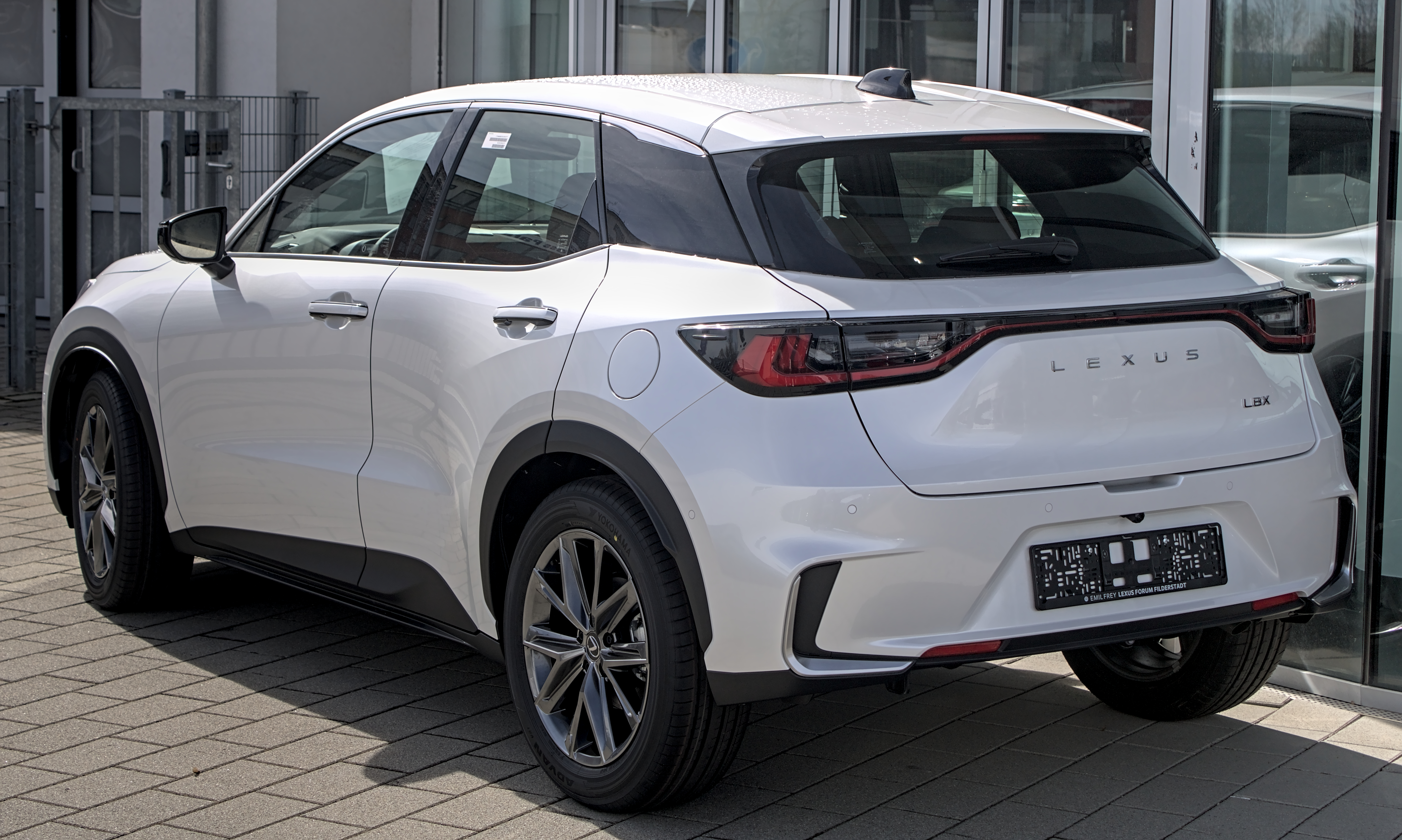
Rear view

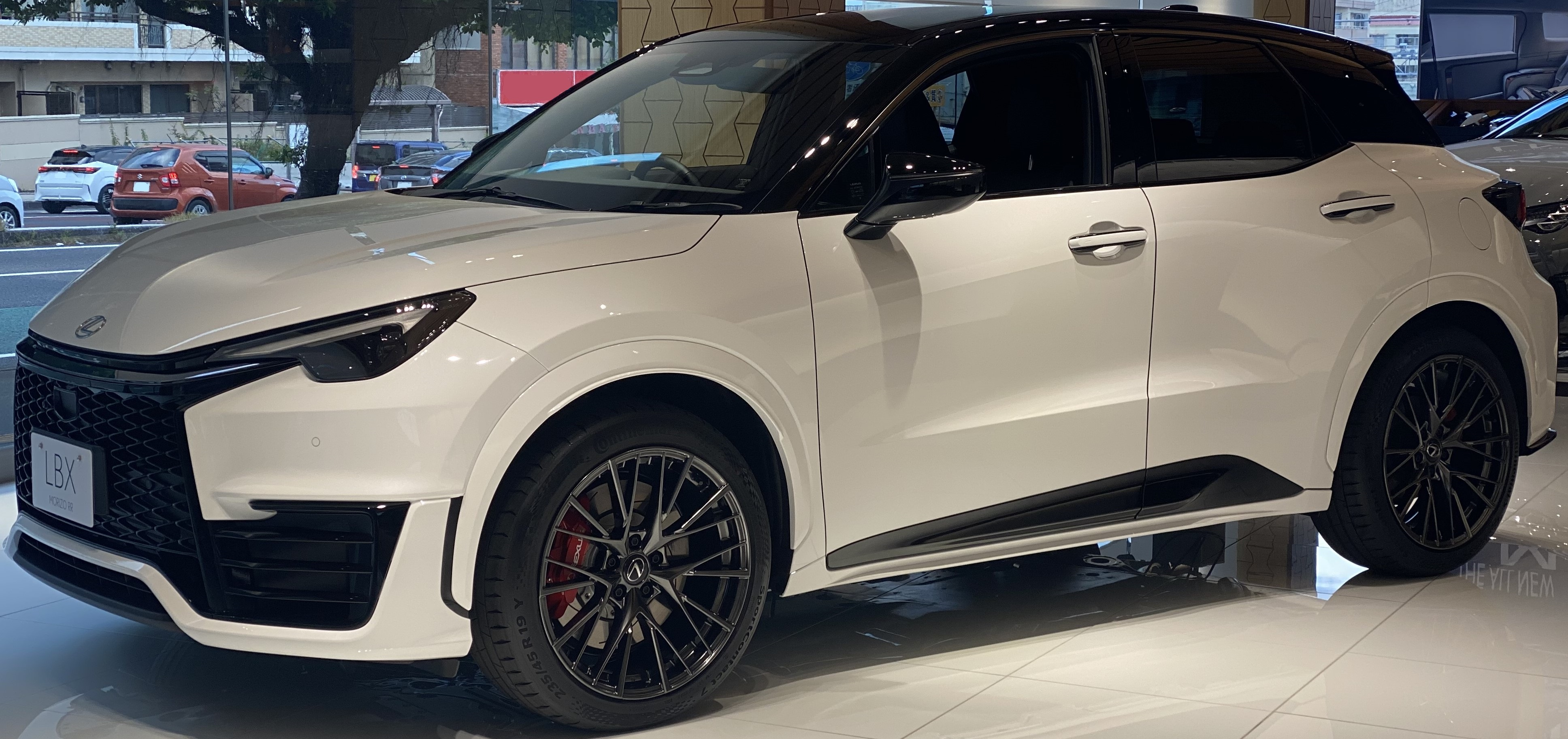
LBX Morizo RR

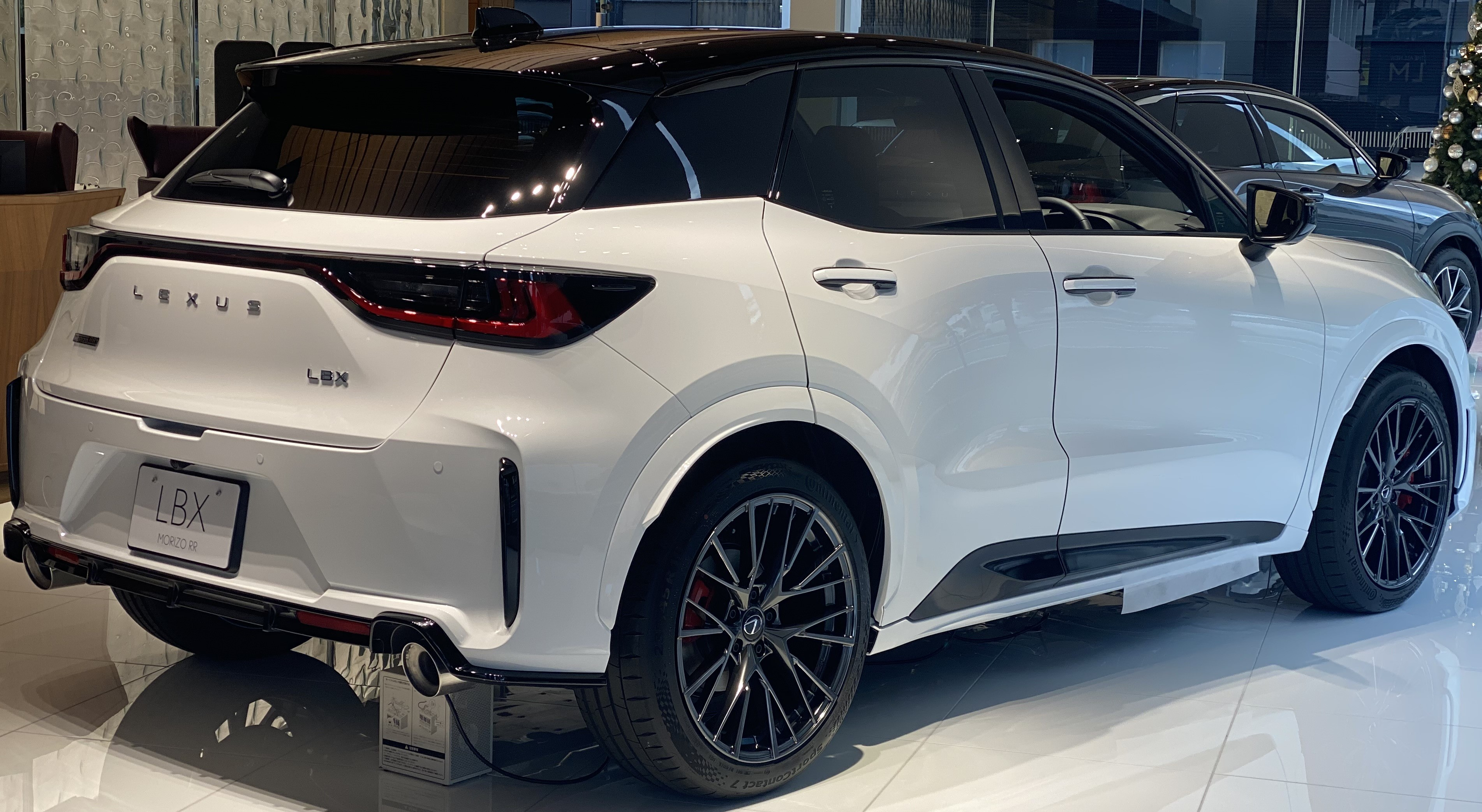
LBX Morizo RR (Rear view)

=== Interior ===
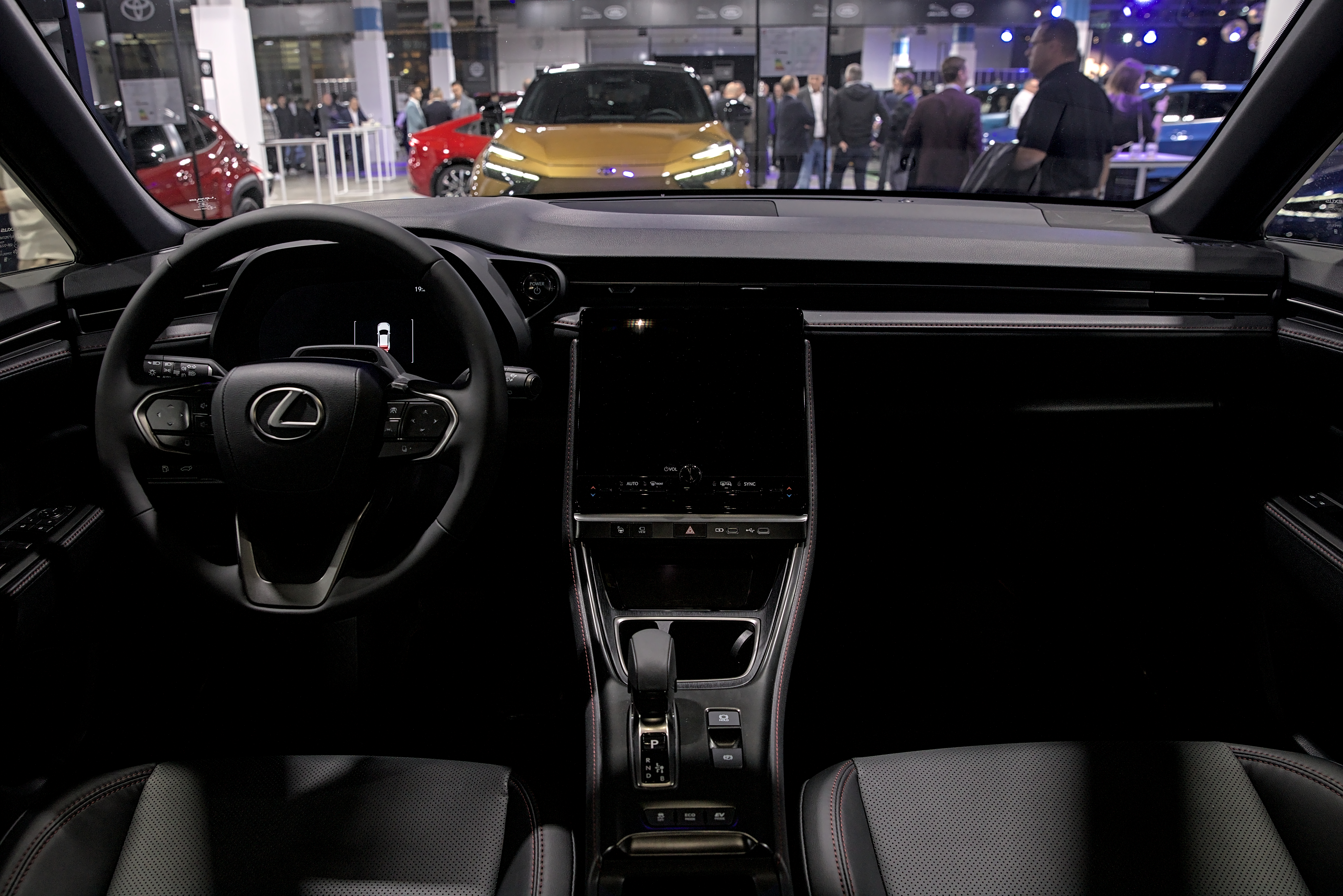
Interior

The primary goal Lexus designers were going for was a simple and refined interior. A multitude of upholsteries and trims are available, as well as semi-aniline leather, a vegan-friendly interior that uses synthetic leather and vegan materials for the seat covers, steering wheel, shift lever and door trims. Ambient lighting adds to the “Omotenashi” effect, which means hospitality in English. This effect is meant to evoke being welcome and feeling at home in the car. The lighting provides features 50 colour options, with themes made for different moods.

The interior features the 'tazuna' concept that was previewed by the LF-30 Electrified concept car. The word tazuna is derived from the “reins” used to control horses. The Tazuna concept is updated with 12.3-inch digital instrument display. A head-up display is optional, and different drive modes are available. The LBX features upholstered side pads and features two cupholders, multiple storage areas, and USB ports for smartphone charging. The compartment offers 332 litres (11.7 cu ft) for front-wheel drive models with seats in place.

Additionally, a 9.8-inch touchscreen is available which runs the Lexus Link Connect system. The “Hey Lexus” assistant responds to both front seat passenger and driver commands. Apple CarPlay and Android Auto are both standard on the LBX, however a smart key is optional. Over-the-air update capability is standard for multimedia and safety systems. A 13-speaker Mark Levinson premium sound system is available, as well as a subwoofer at the rear of the car.

=== Safety ===
ANCAP test results Lexus LBX 1.5L hybrid variants (2024, aligned with Euro NCAP)
Test	Points	%
Overall:	5 /5 stars	
Adult occupant:	33.08	82%
Child occupant:	42.60	86%
Pedestrian:	50.02	76%
Safety assist:	14.33	79%

Euro NCAP test results Lexus LBX 1.5 hybrid (LHD) (2024)
Test	Points	%
Overall:	5 /5 stars	
Adult occupant:	33.1	82%
Child occupant:	41.1	83%
Pedestrian:	50	79%
Safety assist:	13.8	76%

== Powertrain ==
The LBX adopts a bi-polar nickel–metal hydride battery, which according to chief engineer Kunihiko Endo offers much greater power density and throughput potential than traditional lithium-ion cells.

Type	Engine code	Displ.	Power	Torque	Combined system output	Electric motor	Battery	Transmission	Model code	Layout	Cal. years
Petrol hybrid	M15A-FXE	1,490 cc (1.5 L) I3	Engine: 67 kW (90 hp; 91 PS) @ 5,500 rpm Front motor: 69 kW (93 hp; 94 PS)	Engine: 120 N⋅m (12.2 kg⋅m; 88.5 lb⋅ft) @ 3,800–4,800 rpm Front motor: 185 N⋅m (18.9 kg⋅m; 136 lb⋅ft)	100 kW (134 hp; 136 PS)	1VM AC synchronous (front)	5-Ah nickel–metal hydride	eCVT	MAYH10	FWD	2023–present
Petrol hybrid	M15A-FXE	1,490 cc (1.5 L) I3	+ Rear motor: 5 kW (6.7 hp; 6.8 PS)	+ Rear motor: 52 N⋅m (5.3 kg⋅m; 38 lb⋅ft)	100 kW (134 hp; 136 PS)	+ 1MM AC synchronous (rear)	5-Ah nickel–metal hydride	eCVT	MAYH15	E-four/AWD-i	2023–present
Petrol (Morizo RR)	G16E-GTS	1,618 cc (1.6 L) turbocharged I3	206–224 kW (276–300 hp; 280–305 PS) @ 6,500 rpm	390–400 N⋅m (39.8–40.8 kg⋅m; 288–295 lb⋅ft) @ 3,250–4,600 rpm	-	-	-	6-speed EA67F manual 8-speed UC80F "GR-DAT" automatic	GAYA16	AWD	2024–present

== Sales ==
The LBX sales target is 3,500 units per month (including 2,000 units per month just for Europe, 1,200 units per month for Japan and 300 units per month for other markets such as Australia and Southeast Asia).

== Awards ==
The LBX won the “Car of the Year” and the "Small SUV" titles at an awards ceremony, 'What Car? Car of the Year Awards 2024', in London.
