= Yaguchi =

Yaguchi (矢口, lit. arrow mouth) is a Japanese surname. Notable people with the surname include:

- Aki Yaguchi, a Japanese/Australian artist
- Mari Yaguchi (born 1983), a Japanese pop singer
- Masaaki Yaguchi (born 1979), guitarist for the Japanese rock band called Mucc
- Shinobu Yaguchi (born 1967), a Japanese film director and screenwriter
- Yoko Yaguchi (1921–1985), a Japanese actress, and the wife of Japanese filmmaker Akira Kurosawa for 39 years
- Yukihiko Yaguchi (born 1955), a Japanese car designer
- Yutaka Yaguchi (1932–2023), a martial artist
