= Lexus IS (XE20) =

Japanese compact executive car

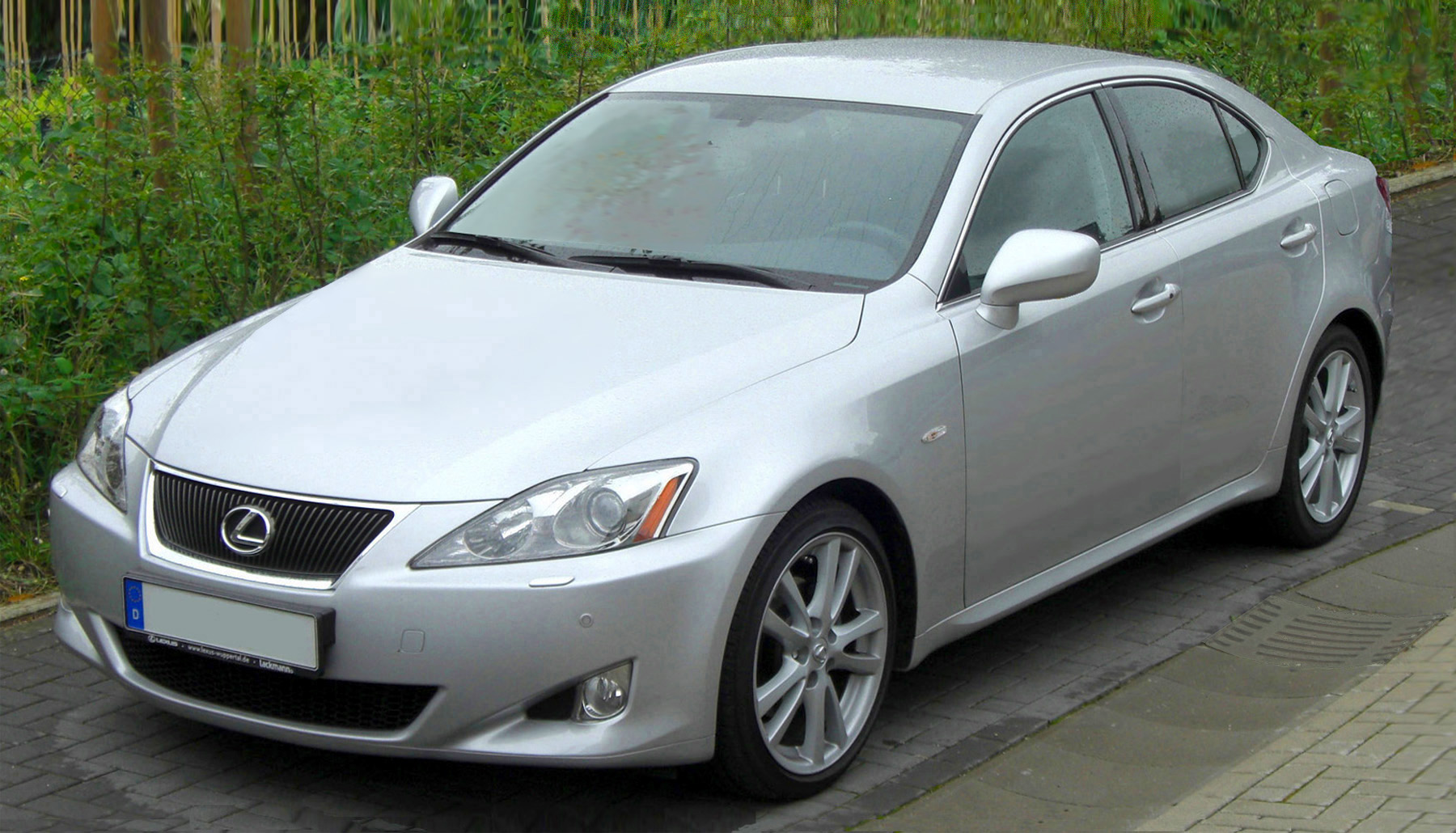

Overview
- Manufacturer: Toyota
- Production: September 2005 – April 2013
- Assembly: Japan: Tahara, Aichi (Tahara plant); Japan: Miyawaka, Fukuoka (TMK)

Body and chassis
- Class: Compact executive car
- Body style: 4-door sedan; 2-door coupé convertible
- Layout: Front-engine, rear-wheel drive; Front-engine, all-wheel drive
- Platform: Toyota N platform

Powertrain
- Engine: 2.2 L 2AD-FHV I4 (diesel); 2.5 L 4GR-FSE V6; 3.0 L 3GR-FE V6; 3.5 L 2GR-FSE V6; 5.0 L 2UR-GSE V8 (IS F)
- Transmission: 6-speed RA62 manual; 6-speed RA63 manual; 6-speed A960E automatic; 6-speed A760E automatic; 8-speed AA80E automatic

Dimensions
- Wheelbase: 2,730 mm (107.5 in)
- Length: 4,575–4,580 mm (180.1–180.3 in) (sedan); 4,636 mm (182.5 in) (convertible); 4,661 mm (184 in) (IS F)
- Width: 1,800–1,815 mm (70.9–71.5 in)
- Height: 1,415–1,440 mm (55.7–56.7 in)
- Curb weight: 1,558–1,685 kg (3,435–3,715 lb)

Chronology
- Predecessor: Lexus IS (XE10)
- Successor: Lexus IS (XE30); Lexus RC (for IS C)

The Lexus IS (XE20) is a car produced by the Japanese carmaker Toyota under its luxury division, Lexus. Classified as a compact executive car, it represented the second generation of the Lexus IS. It served as Lexus's entry-level sedan from 2005 until its production ended in 2013. Toyota manufactured the XE20 at the facility in Tahara, Aichi, and the Kyushu factory in Miyawaka, Fukuoka (until 2012). It was available as both a four-door sedan and a two-door coupe—the latter designated by a "C" at the end of their name (e.g., "IS 250 C").

The development of the XE20 began in 2001 under the direction of Suguya Fukusato—chief engineer of the project. Primarily designed by Kengo Matsumoto, a pre-production version of the IS debuted at the Geneva International Motor Show in March 2005. The final model debuted at the New York International Auto Show in April of the same year. Production of the IS officially began in September 2005 at both the Tahara and Miyawaka facilities. Lexus implemented a staged roll out of the XE20 models, starting with the IS 250 and IS 350 in 2005. The IS 300 and IS 220d, the latter of which marked Lexus's first diesel model, followed in 2006. In 2010, the IS 220d was replaced by the IS 200d. Lexus also produced high-performance variants of the IS under the F marque, known as the IS F.

The XE20 shared its platform with the fourth generation of the LS and the second generation of the GS, both of which were also built at the facility in Tahara. While several minor updates have been made, the XE20 has undergone one major facelift; this update included a slightly revised front fascia, an interior refresh, and modifications to the suspension. The XE20 has been well-received by car critics, who have most praised its design and reliability. The car has received numerous accolades, including Ward's 10 Best Engines in both 2006 and 2007 for the IS 350 and Car's Performance Car of the Year for the IS F in 2008. Production of the XE20 ended at the Kyushu facility in 2012, while manufacture at the Tahara plant ended in the subsequent year. It was succeeded by the XE30 model, which began production in April 2013. The IS C remained in production until 2014 when it was replaced by the RC.

== History of development ==
=== Development ===
After commencement of U.S. sales of the XE10 in 2000, development began on its successor, the XE20 under chief engineer Suguya Fukusato in 2001. Design work was done under Kengo Matsumoto for a period of 2 years from 2002 into late 2003 when the final conceptual design by Hiroyuki Tada, utilizing the new corporate styling theme of L-finesse was chosen. From 2003 into the first half of 2004, the conceptual design was further refined into the production design specifications, being then approved by the executive board. Design patents were filed in September 2004 in Japan, on 18 February 2005 in Europe, and 25 February 2005 at the United States Patent Office upon conclusion of development in early 2005.

=== Exterior and interior ===
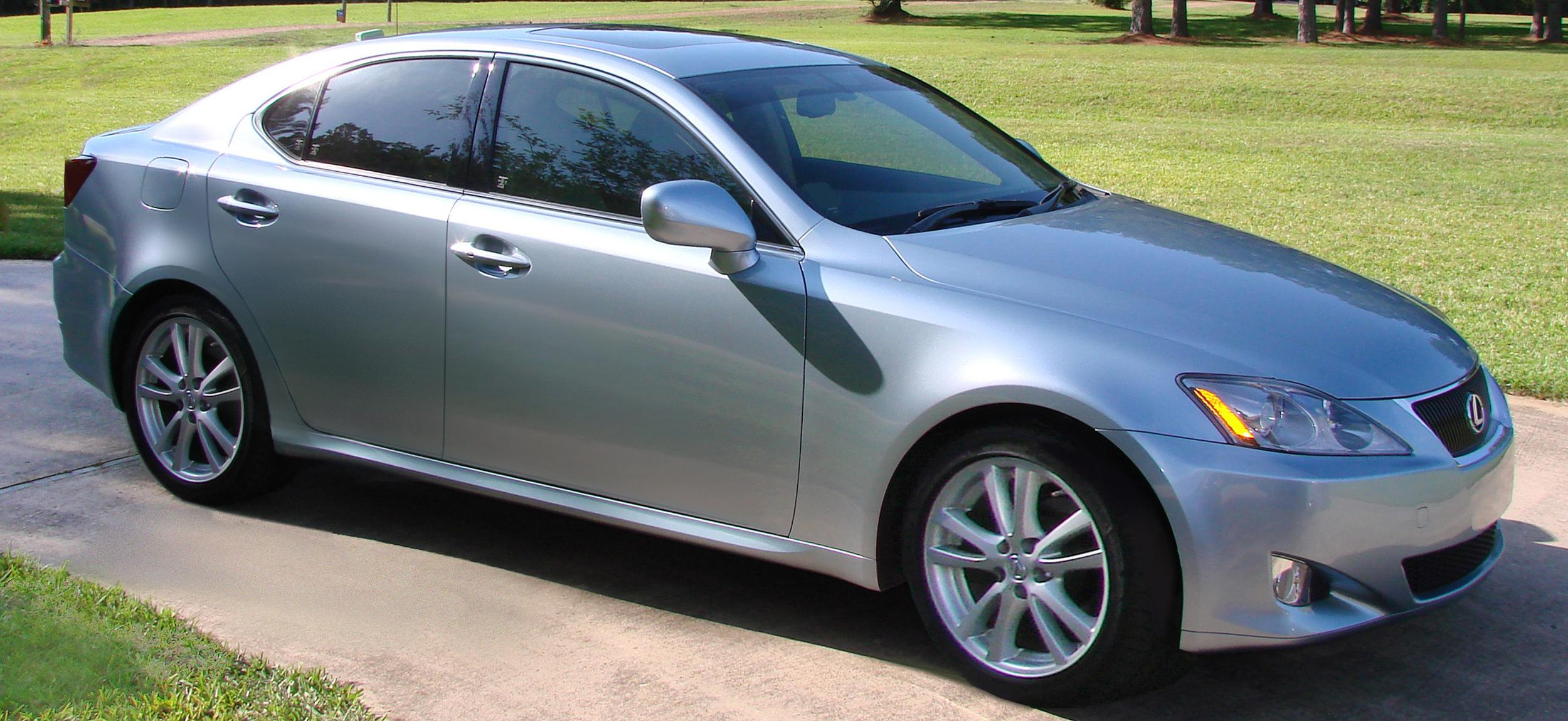
2008 Lexus IS 250 (GSE20; U.S.)

The second generation Lexus IS was the second debut of Lexus' new L-finesse design philosophy on a production vehicle, following the premiere of the 2006 Lexus GS performance sedan. The new IS design featured sleeker, coupé-like contours, a fastback profile, and a repeated arrowhead motif in the front fascia and side windows based on the Japanese concept of kirikaeshi, referring to angular movements. The forward design was reminiscent of the earlier Lexus LF-C coupé concept. Compared to its predecessor, the second generation IS was 3.5 inches (89 mm) longer and nearly 3 inches (76 mm) wider, largely due to a 2.3 inches (58 mm) wheelbase stretch. The grille was set at a lower level than the headlights. The new IS body resulted in a 0.28 C_{d} figure.

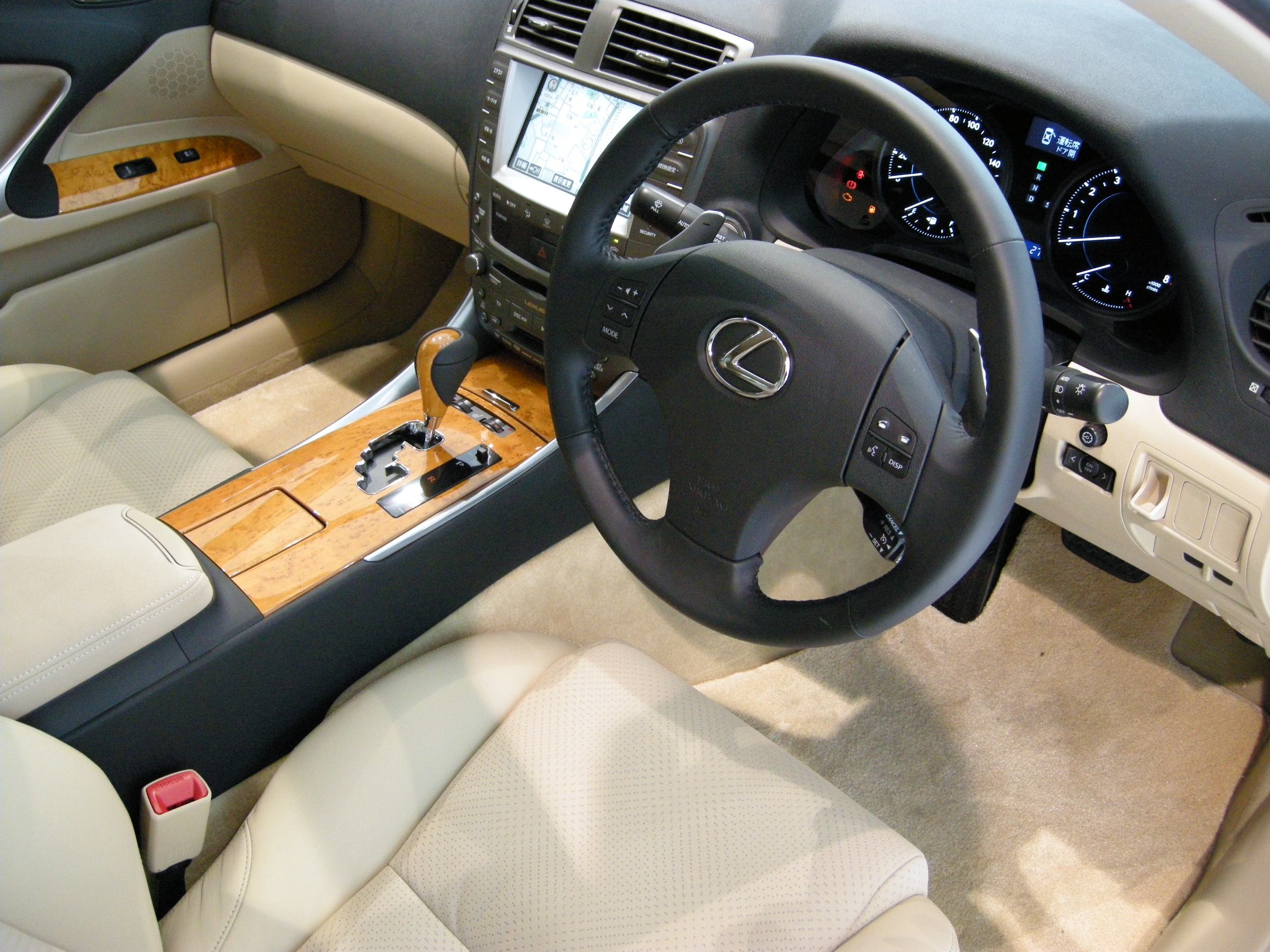
2007 Lexus IS 350 interior (GSE21; Japan)

The second generation IS interior features leather seats, lightsaber-like electroluminescent instrument display lighting and LED interior lighting accents, 10-way (including lumbar) driver and front passenger power seats, and the choice of faux-metallic or optional Bird's Eye Maple wood grain trim made by Yamaha piano craftsmen from sustainable plantations. The interior design also derived elements from Japanese concepts, including hazushi, where an object retains individuality while being part of a large whole, as typified in side air vents. Other available interior features include perforated leather seats, heated and ventilated front seats, power tilt/telescoping steering wheel, moonroof, electrochromic side view mirrors, power rear sunshade, and aluminum scuff plates.

=== Safety systems ===
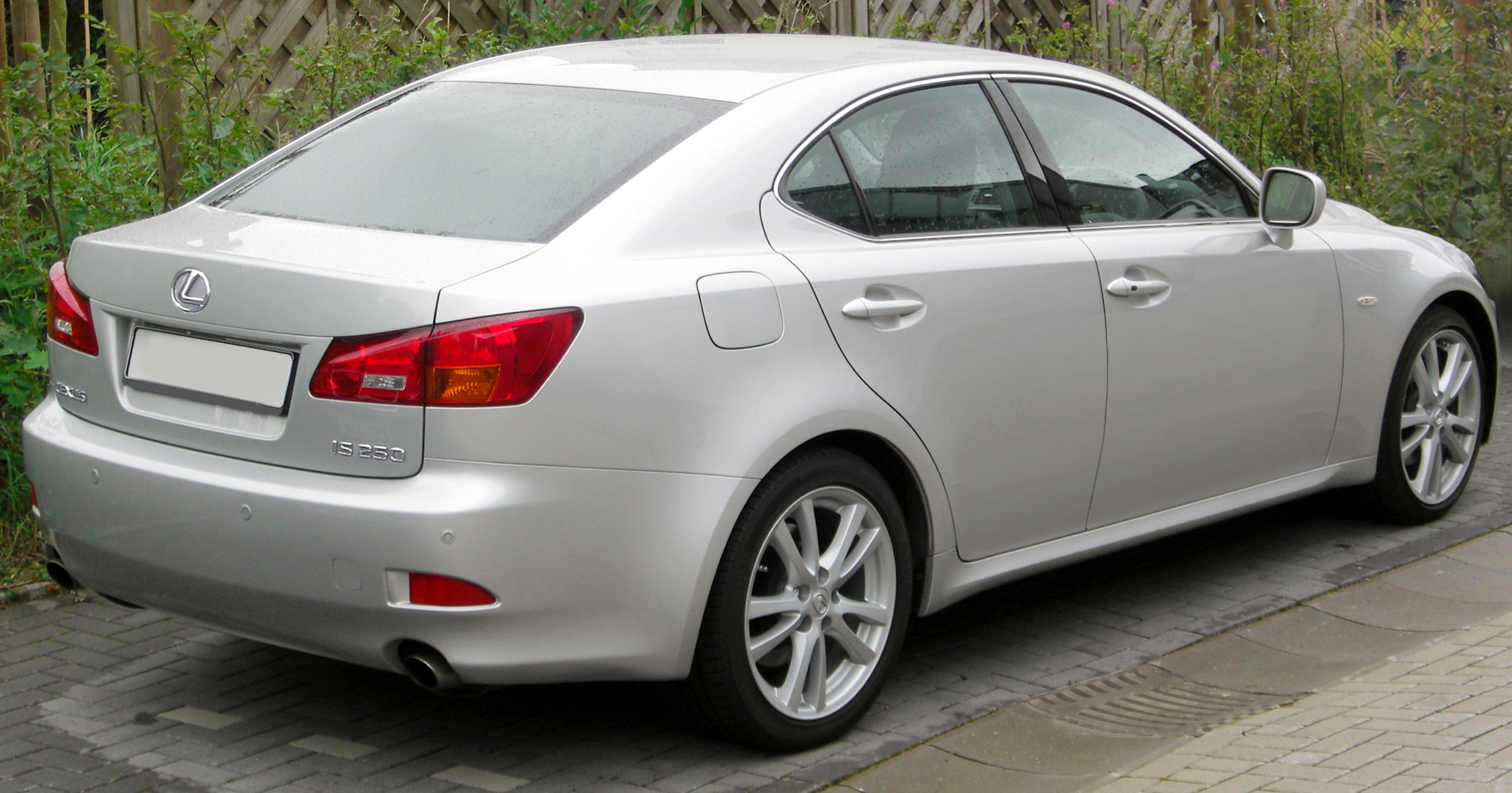
2008 Lexus IS 250 (GSE20; Europe)

The Lexus IS features standard dual front airbags, front row knee airbags, front and rear side curtain airbags, and front side torso airbags. The new IS also debuted its manufacturer's latest twin-chamber, V-shaped front passenger airbag. Initially, the IS 250 came with the Vehicle Stability Control (VSC) system while the IS 350 used a more advanced VDIM system which reacts sooner with less intrusive operation. A Pre-Collision System (PCS) is the first offered in the entry-luxury performance sedan market segment.

National Highway Traffic Safety Administration (NHTSA) crash test results in 2008 rated the IS the maximum five stars in the Side Driver and Rollover categories, and four stars in the Frontal Driver, Frontal Passenger, and Side Rear Passenger categories. Euro NCAP scores were the maximum five stars in Adult Occupant, four stars in Child Occupant, and two of four stars in Pedestrian test categories. The Insurance Institute for Highway Safety gives the Lexus IS sedan a "Good" overall score for both front and side impact tests, and also ranks the IS "Good" in all other measured categories in the front and side impact crash tests but give it a "Poor" score for small overlap front.

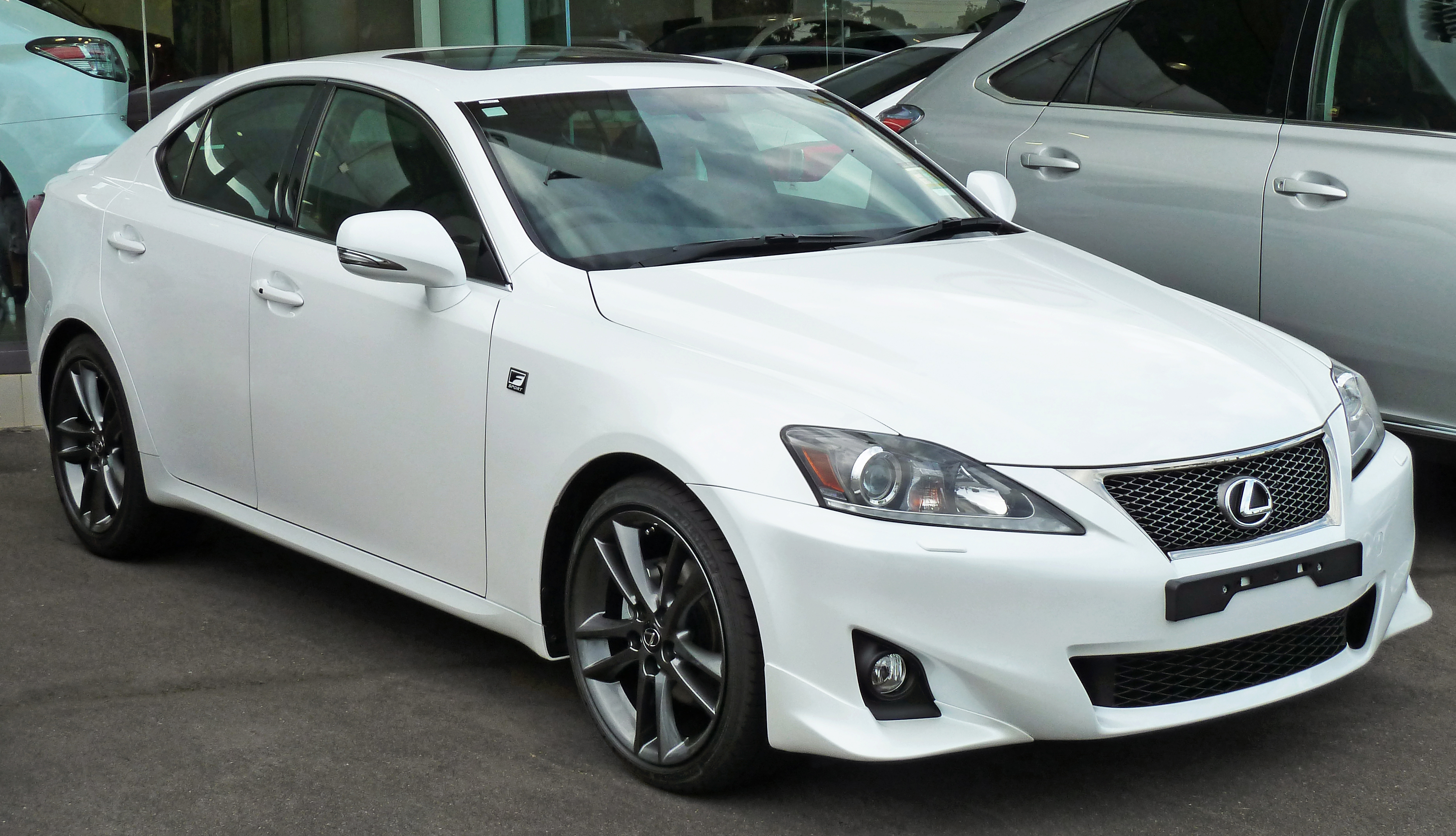
2010–2011 Lexus IS 250 (GSE20R) F Sport (Australia)

=== Technical features ===
For the IS 250, IS 350, and IS F, engines feature the manufacturer's D-4S fuel injection system, which combines direct and indirect injection; these models are ULEV-II emission certified in the United States by the California Air Resources Board. The IS line also features an Electric Power Steering (EPS) system which replaces the previous hydraulic steering pump.

Technical features on the second generation Lexus IS further include rain-sensing wipers, Intuitive Park Assist (IPA), bi-xenon headlamps, Adaptive Front-lighting System (AFS), and Dynamic Radar Cruise Control. Lexus' SmartAccess keyless entry with push-button start is a standard feature along with a memory system that can recall driver's seat, side mirror, and steering positions. A 7" touchscreen DVD-based Gen V navigation system with voice recognition, Bluetooth, a backup camera, and a 14-speaker Mark Levinson premium sound system are available as options.

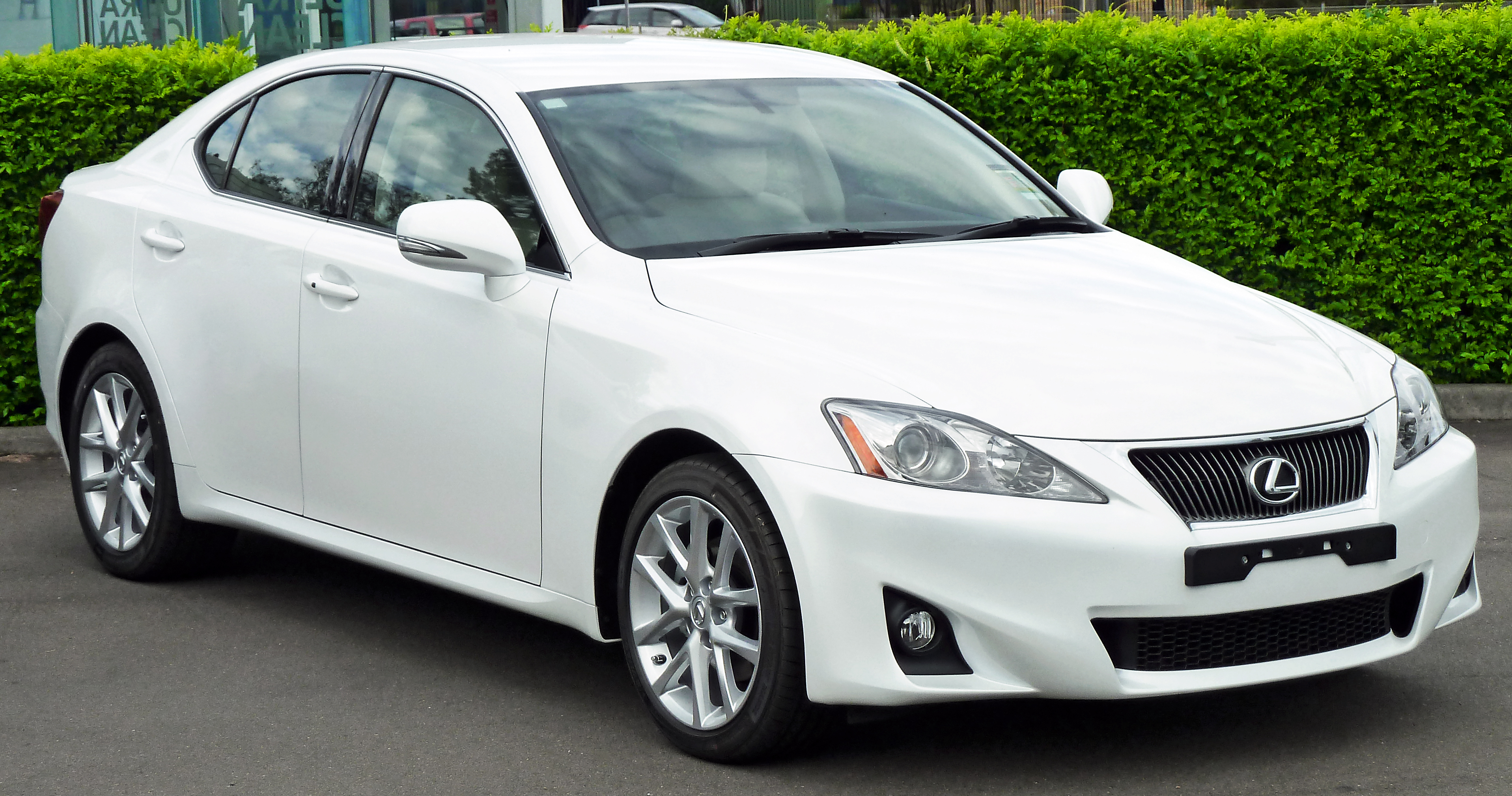
2010–2011 Lexus IS 250 (GSE20R; Australia)

=== Updates ===
In response to criticism regarding the lack of a stability/traction control disable switch on 2006 IS models, Lexus added a VDIM/VSC off switch for the 2007 model year. For 2006 IS models, the stability control system/traction control system can be disabled through non-conventional methods by using a code during engine start.

In the 2007 IS models, in addition to the on/off switch for the traction-control system, Lexus added a roof-mounted shark-fin antenna in some markets. (The Australian delivered IS models did not receive the fin-style antenna until its first appearance on the IS F in 2008). For 2008 models, the steering system was tweaked for improved steering feel and the rear seats were modified to improve rear room.

The 2008 mid-cycle refresh for the 2009 model year (designed by Takahiro Kanno in 2007) included revised interior and exterior styling, the suspension and steering was retuned for improved stability and control, and the IS 250 also gained VDIM as standard for the 2009 model year. In 2009, Masanari Sakae designed revisions to the IS Line, which were patent registered in November 2009 in Japan and 27 April 2010 in Europe. In the second quarter of 2010 (2011 MY), these new revisions were introduced, featuring a refreshed exterior with new wheels, LED daytime running lights, additional interior features, and dedicated IS F-Sport production models.

== Standard models ==
=== GSE20 / GSE21 (2005) ===
The IS 250 (GSE20) went on sale in 2005 in Japan and North America in RWD (GSE20) and IS 250 AWD (GSE25) configuration, along with the more powerful rear-wheel drive IS 350 (GSE21) sedan. The IS 250 RWD comes standard with a 6-speed manual transmission, with a 6-speed automatic transmission available as an option. All other gasoline-powered IS sedans are only available with the automatic.

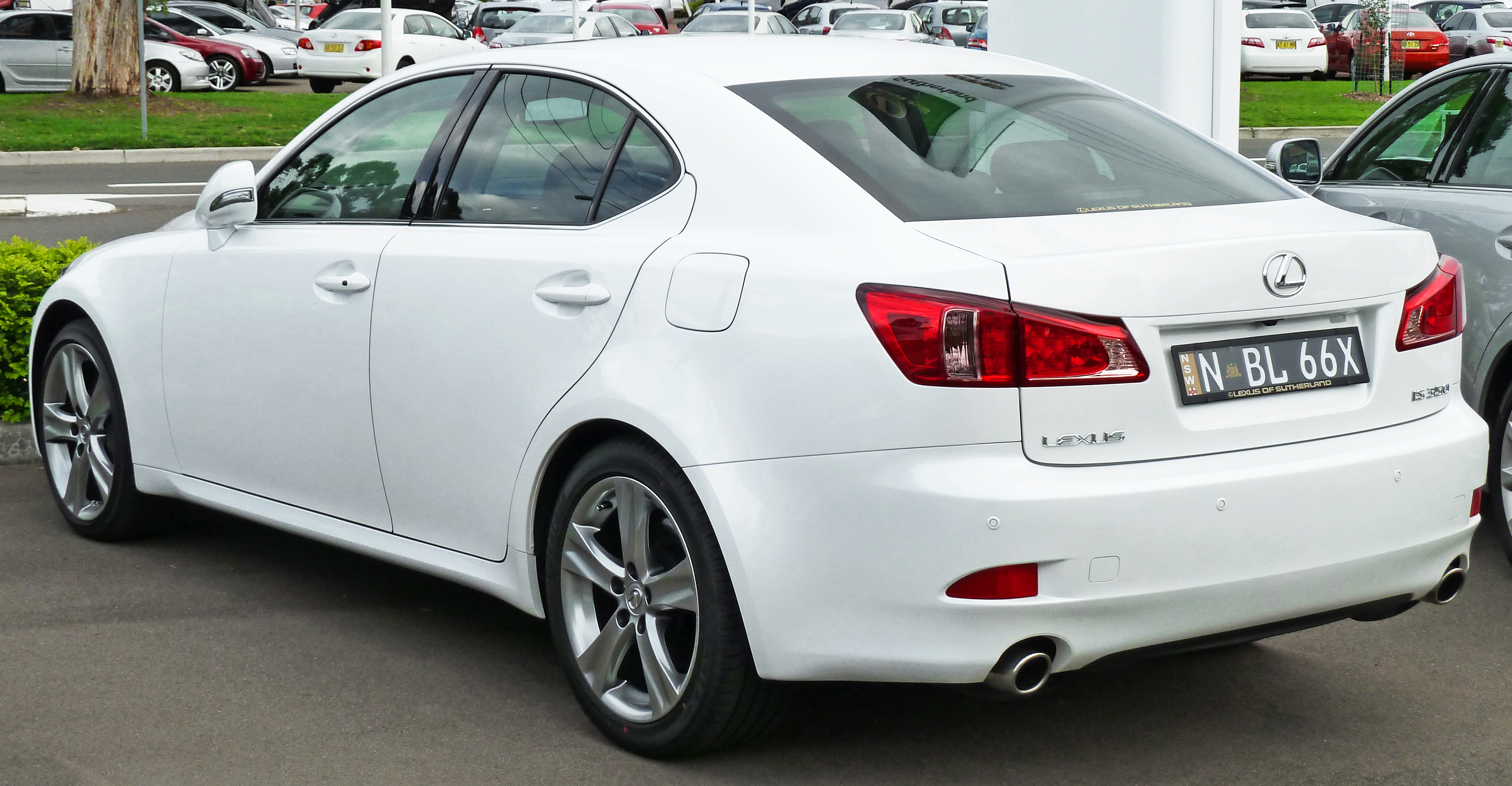
2010–2011 Lexus IS 350 (GSE21; Australia)

The IS 350 features larger braking discs and calipers borrowed from the GS 430; the IS 350's larger calipers are four-piston rather than the two-piston front calipers of the IS 250.

Citing independent testing by auto research firm AMCI, Lexus highlighted the IS 350's acceleration as the "fastest in its class" at its launch (see also: Lexus IS performance specifications). Some reviewers noted the second generation models as Lexus' first foray into the sport compact market that compared fairly well with its German competitors. However, some criticisms were that its steering was not as communicative as that of some rivals, the rear seat legroom (while improved over the first generation) was still tight, and that the six-speed manual was only available on the IS 250. However, the IS' performance has also been praised, for example in a February 2007 Road & Track Japanese luxury sports sedan comparison, in which the IS 350 took first place.

=== ALE20 / GSE22 (2006) ===
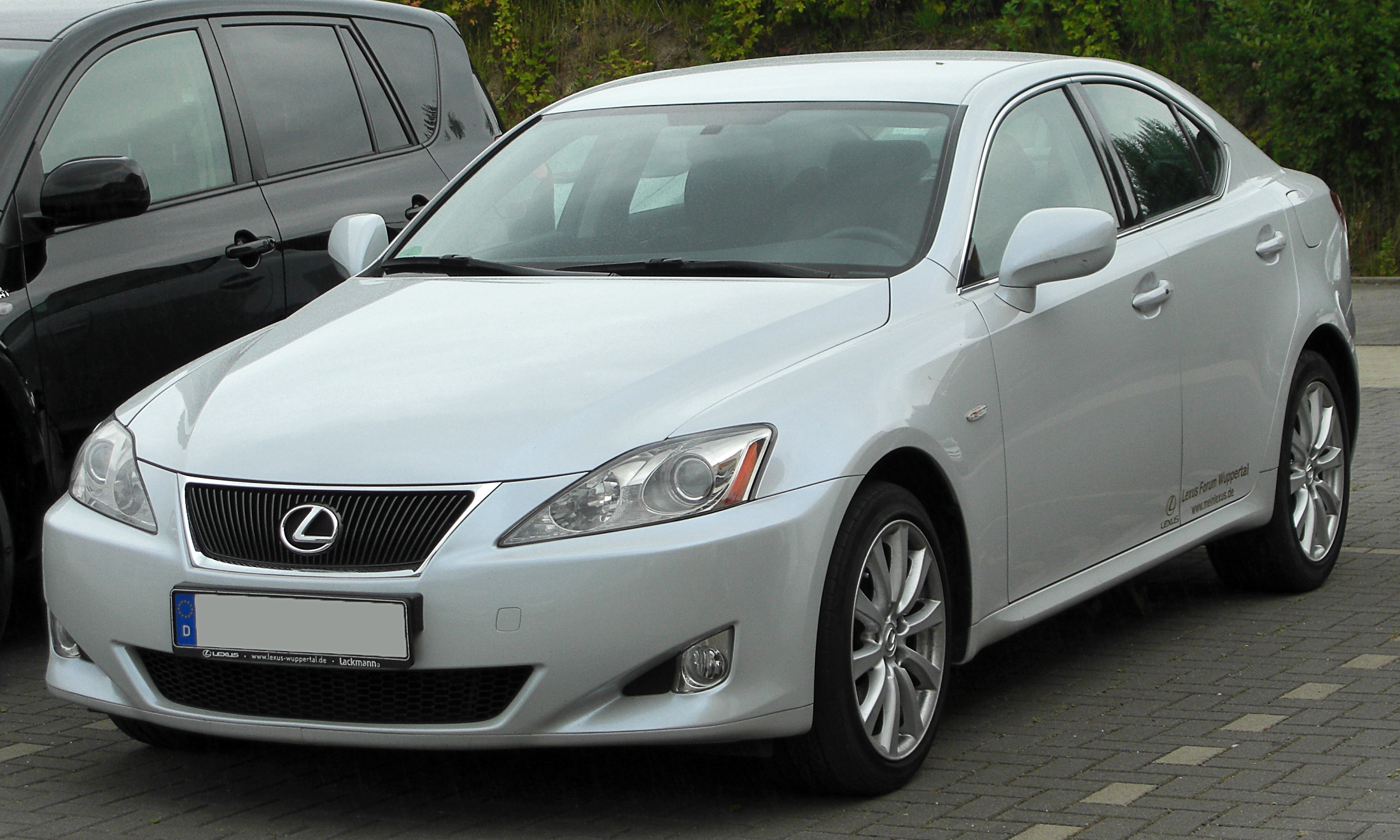
Lexus IS 220d (ALE20; Europe)

Introduced for sale in European markets in 2006, the IS 220d (ALE20) was the first diesel-powered Lexus ever produced. The IS 220d featured a 2.2 L 2AD-FHV Inline-4 diesel engine, capable of 175 hp (130 kW), and rear wheel drive. The IS 220d was only offered with a manual transmission. Introduced to Chinese and Middle Eastern markets in 2006, the IS 300 (GSE22) was tailored to the fuel requirements of those regions, with a 3.0 L 3GR-FE V6 engine (without direct injection), 228 hp (170 kW), and rear wheel drive. The IS 300 was also introduced to the Brunei, Indonesia, and Philippines markets.

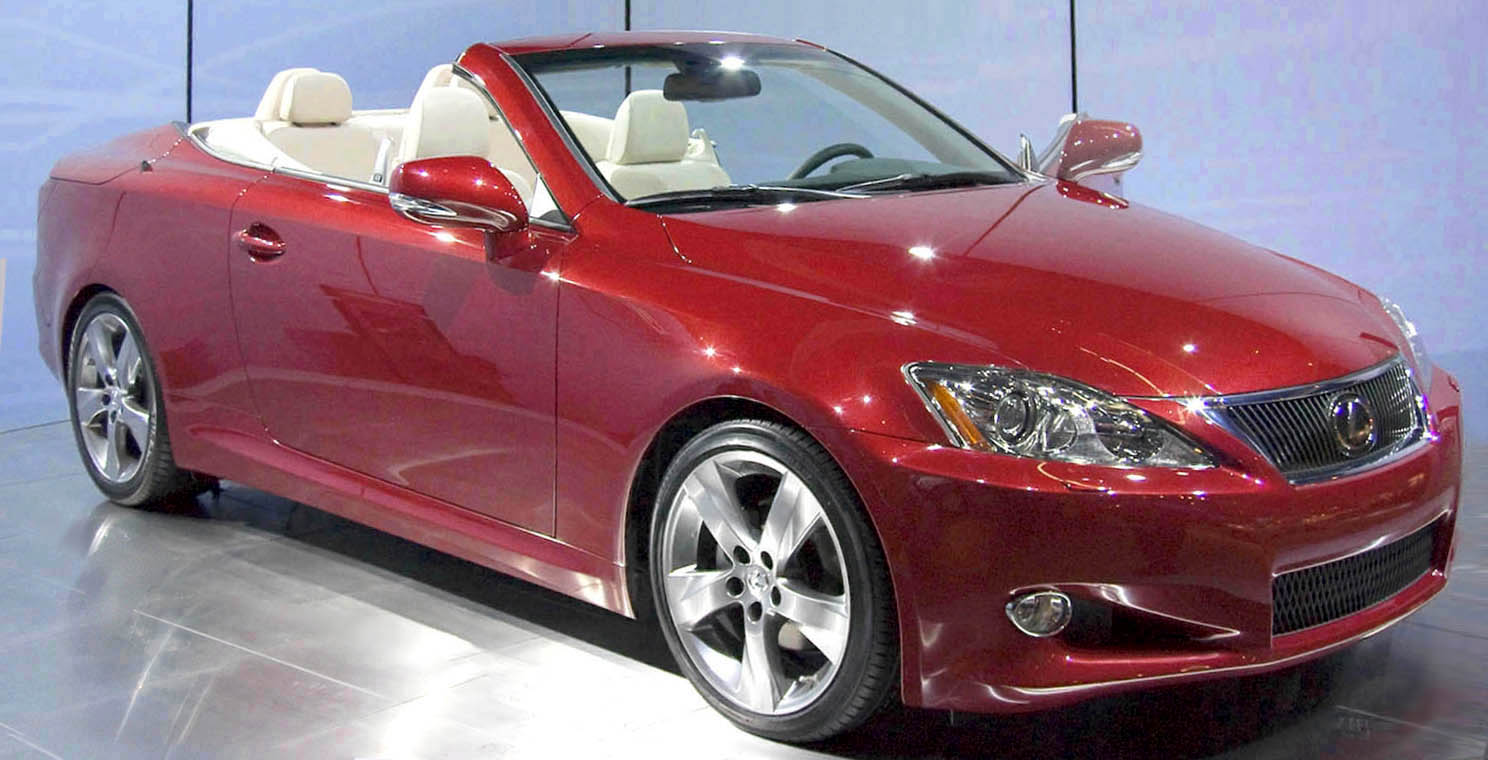
2010 IS 250 C (GSE20; U.S.)

=== GSE20 / GSE21 (2008) ===
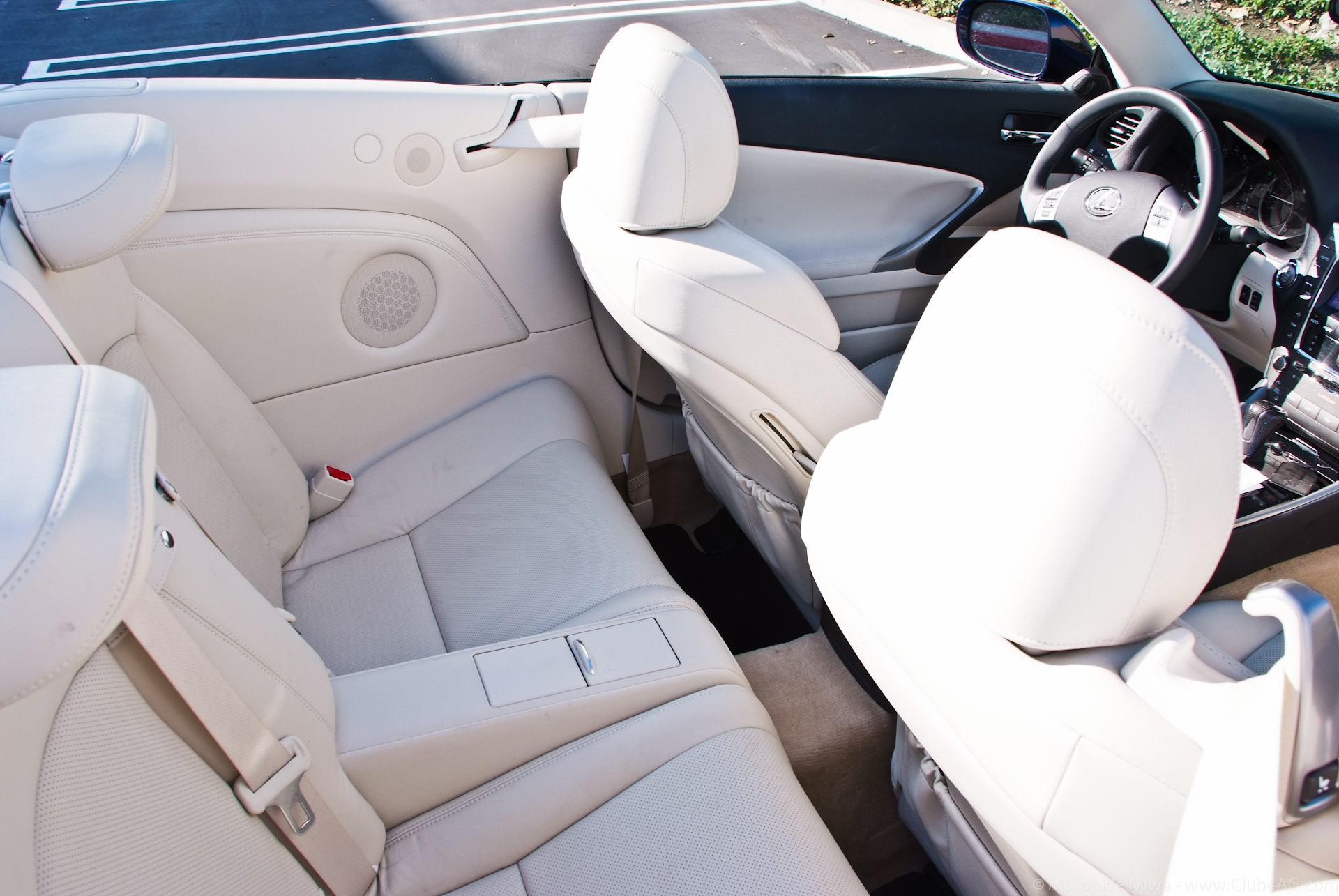
2010 IS 250 C interior (GSE20; US.)

After three years with only one body style, the IS returned with a second body style, this time in coupé convertible form, debuting as the IS 250 C on 2 October 2008 at the Paris Motor Show. A more powerful IS 350 C also became available, with engine specifications analogous to those on the sedan models.

The IS convertible features a three-piece aluminum hardtop that can retract in 21 seconds, a roof-brake mechanism slows panels as they close and near the windshield. The IS 250 C and IS 350 C are offered with a six-speed automatic, while the IS 250 C was also offered with a manual transmission and an all-wheel-drive version. However, as of 2015, the IS C is only available with rear-wheel-drive. The IS convertible's body has a drag coefficient of Cd=0.29.

Sportier models of both trims are available in the form of the IS250 C F-Sport and IS350 F-Sport. As of 2015 these models are the only F-Sport Lexus's to be offered with a wide variety of performance options such as a "F-Sport Air Intake" and "F-Sport Sway Bars" but just like the other Lexus F-Sport models it is offered with a wide variety of wheel choices.

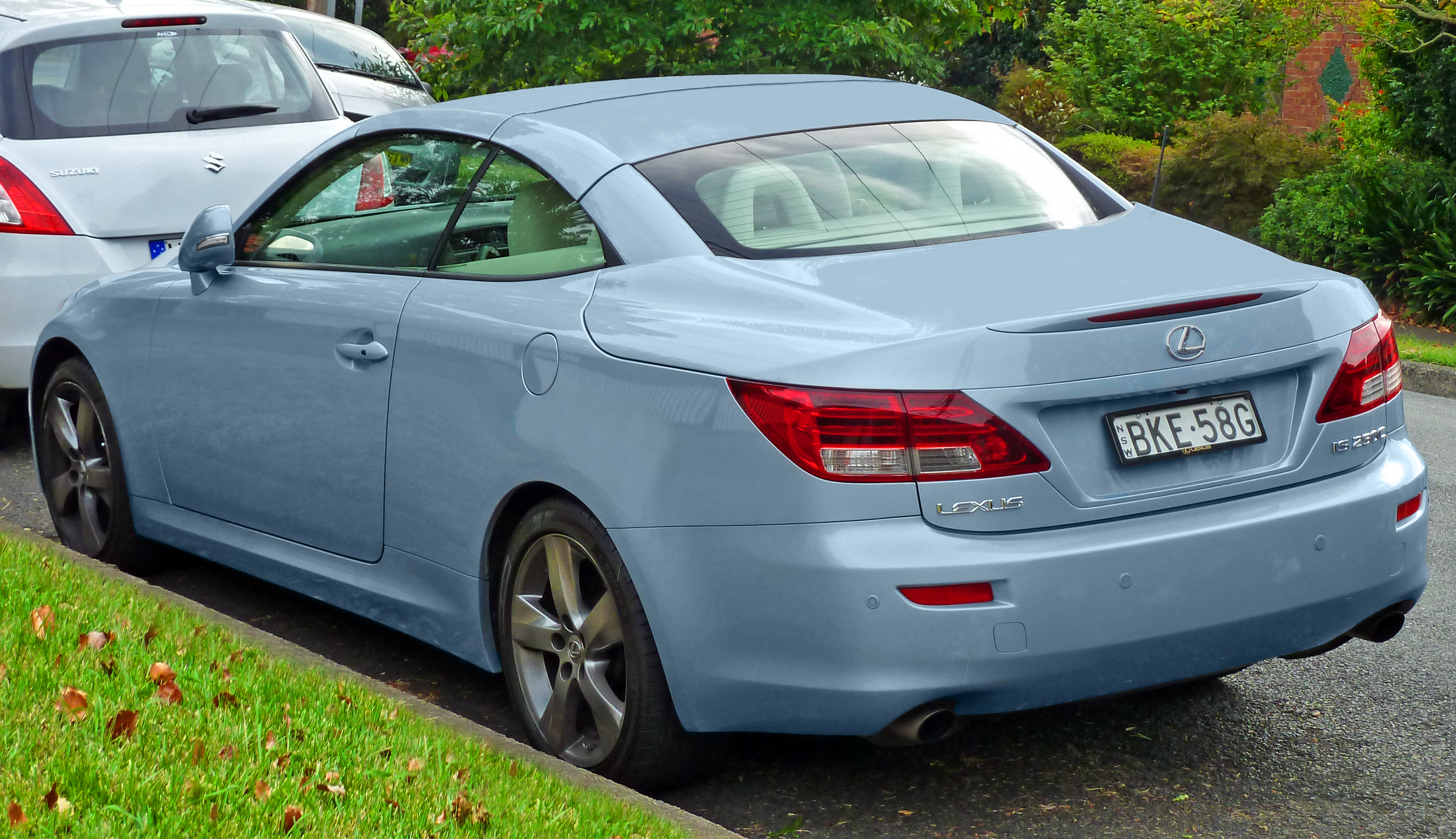
Lexus IS 250 C (GSE20R; Australia)

The IS 250 C went on sale in Europe in 2009, with IS convertible sales for North America targeted for May 2009 as a 2010 model. An IS 300 C is also being produced for certain regions.

=== ALE20 (2010) ===
In 2010, coinciding with the second IS line refresh, the IS 220d was replaced with the more efficient IS 200d, whose improved consumption figures were due to engine retuning. All-wheel drive options were also expanded besides the IS 250 AWD with the addition of the IS 350 AWD model in major markets.

== F marque models ==
During 2005 and 2006, several automotive publications reported on rumors of a higher performance variant of the IS being tested at various stages of development. Spy photos of such a vehicle being tested in Germany and California were published in several magazines and websites. Among these spy reports, several photos were shown of a heavily modified and camouflaged IS sedan at the Nürburgring test track in Germany along with other disguised Lexus test vehicles. The previous generation IS 430 prototype vehicle was indicative of future possibilities for the IS series, including the likelihood that a second generation high-performance IS model could come equipped with a V8 engine. It was rumored that there would be a coupé and a convertible version for a 2009 model, as well as a convertible version of the V8-powered IS.

=== USE20 (2007) ===
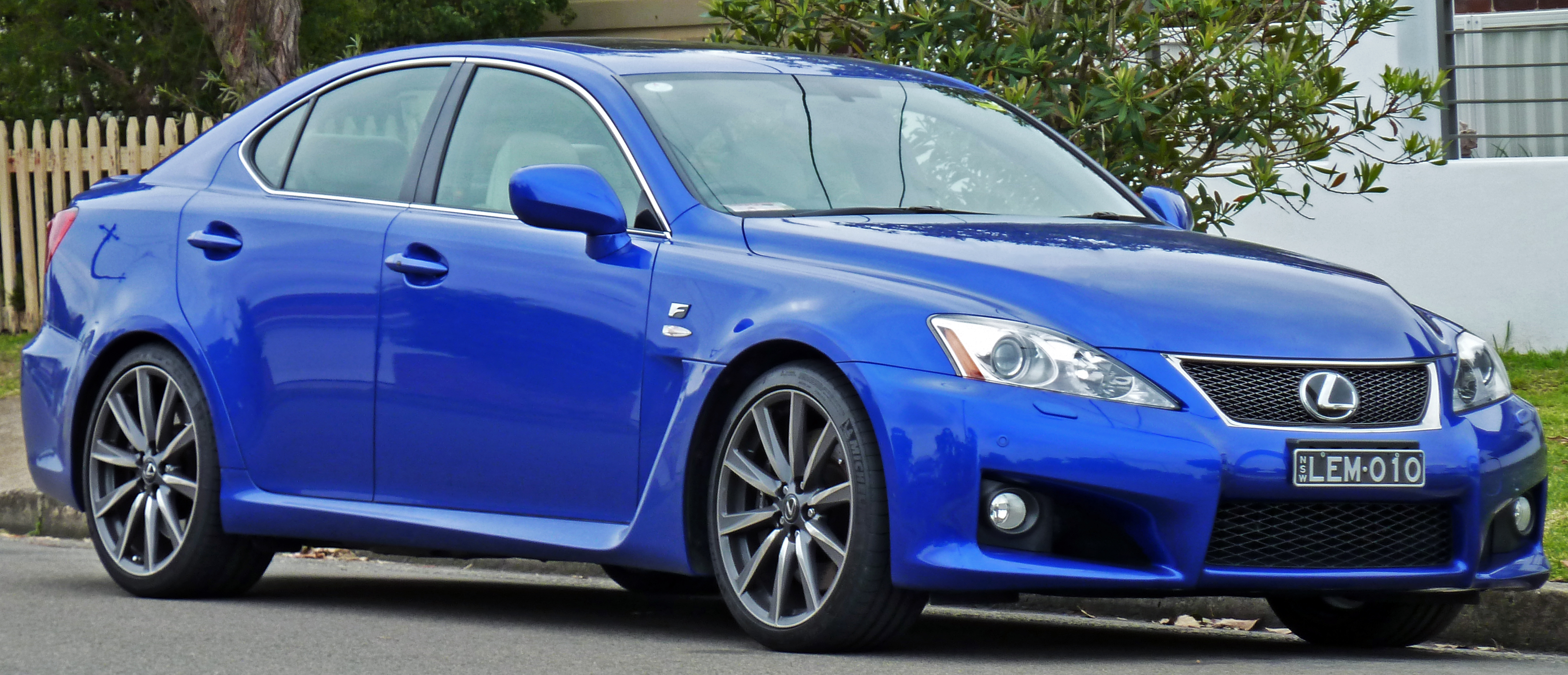
Lexus IS F (USE20; Australia)

In early 2004, just after the final XE20 design had been frozen for production, Lexus engineer Yukihiko Yaguchi, assembled a small team and on a limited budget began work on a higher performance IS. By the first half of 2005, XE20-body prototype mules with the 4.6L 1UR-FE V8 were spotted testing on the Nürburgring. These prototypes were nicknamed "IS 460" by the media. In late 2005, test mules were also spotted on the Nürburgring that were made using body panels from Toyota Crown Royals that were shortened by cutting out sections of the roof and rear doors. The winning exterior design proposal by Hiroshi Okamato (supervised by chief IS designer Kengo Matsumoto), was finalized in 2005.

On 6 December 2006, Lexus officially confirmed the existence of the vehicle which they called IS F in the press release. (Note: Note: Lexus dropped the hyphen in official press documents as of vehicle launch, referring to it as IS F. Several media sites continue to use the hyphen in error.) At the North American International Auto Show on 8 January 2007, the new IS F sedan was debuted to the public along with the LF-A supercar concept. Images were leaked a couple of hours before the official announcement. At its press debut, Lexus revealed that a separate "skunk works" team designed the IS F in a manner distinct from typical Lexus engineering efforts. The chief engineer of the IS F, Yukihiko Yaguchi, previously worked on the Toyota Supra. Much of the IS F's suspension tuning took place at Fuji Speedway in Japan.

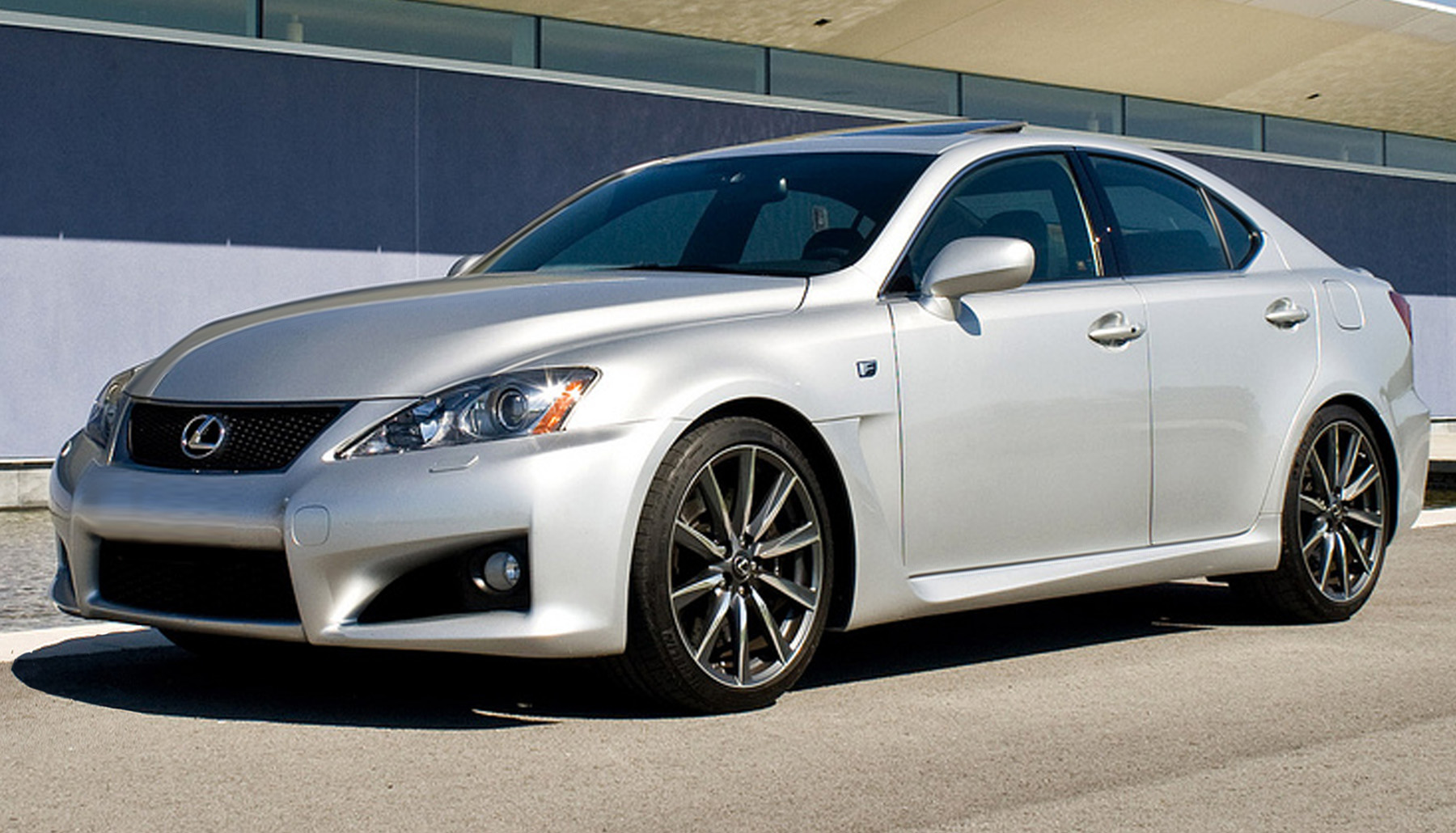
2009 Lexus IS F (USE20; Canada)

The IS F vehicle body was lowered by 1 cm (0.5 inches) compared to the standard IS. The hood features a bulged appearance, with sharper curve than the standard IS, due to the added space needed to contain the 5.0 L V8 engine. The drag coefficient is 0.30 C_{d}. The exterior also features a wire-mesh grille, changed side fenders and skirts, along with side air vents. One noticeable element of the IS F design were its faux quad exhaust tailpipes consisting of two vertically stacked exhaust tips on each side that did not directly connect to the actual exhaust pipes (tips were part of the bumper, rather than the exhaust). The interior features a four-passenger cabin with braided aluminum panels, steering wheel paddle shifters, and F marque emblems. The IS F also features different seating, with bucket seats in front and rear.

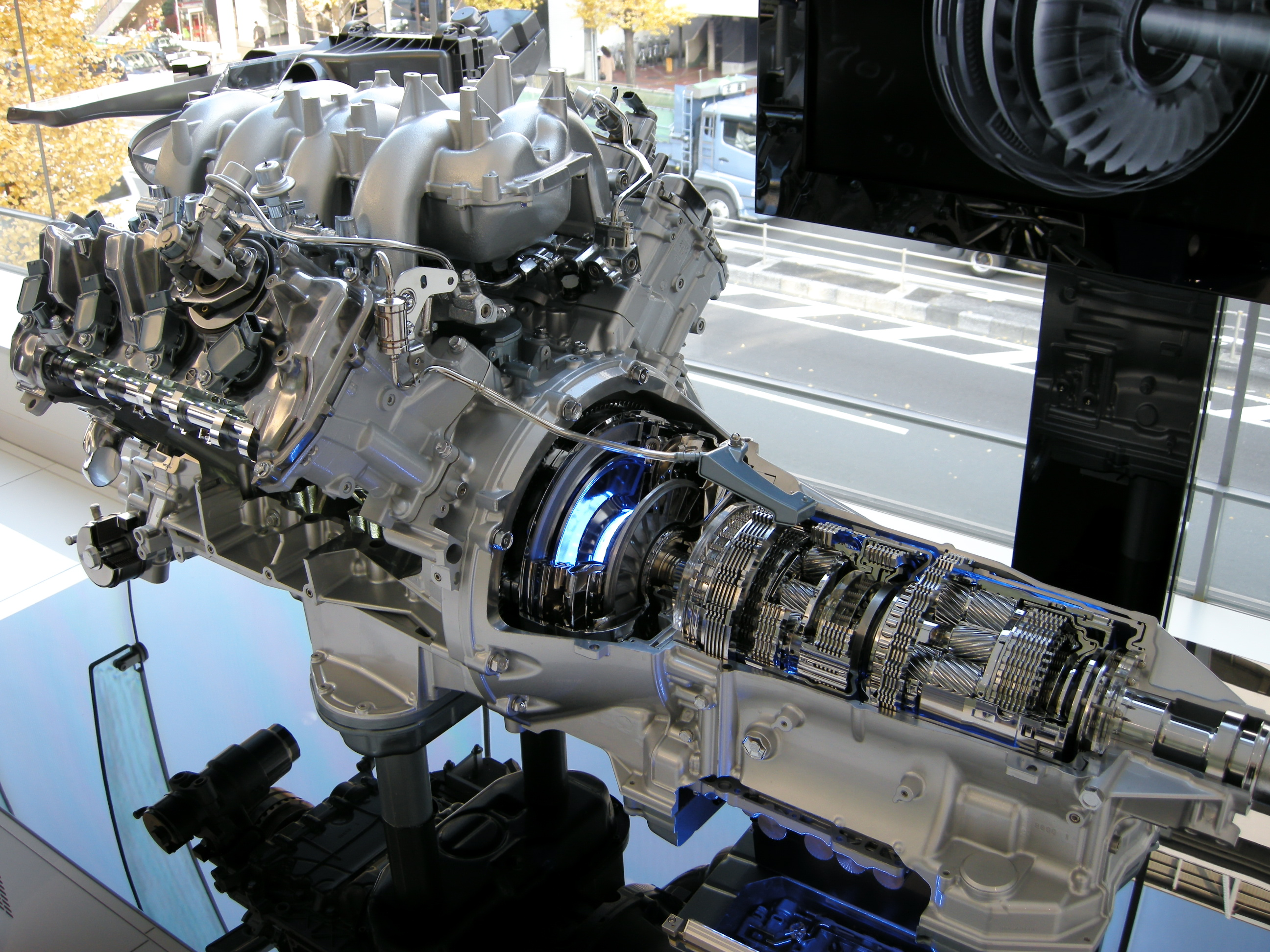
The Lexus IS F engine and transmission

The Lexus IS F features a 4,969 cc (5.0 L; 303.2 cu in) direct-injected 2UR-GSE V8 producing SAE 310 kW (416 bhp; 421 PS) at 6600 rpm, while peak torque is 371 lb⋅ft (503 N⋅m) at 5200 rpm. The engine redlines at 6800 rpm and also features a two-stage intake system, engine oil and automatic transmission fluid coolers and an oil pump designed for high-speed cornering. Along with both port and direct injection, the engine features VVT-iE camshaft timing, and has a compression ratio of 11.8:1. The 2UR-GSE is derived from the Lexus UR-series V8 engines, which debuted as the 1UR-FSE on the 2007 Lexus LS 460. Of the UR-series V8s, the 2UR-GSE is most closely related to the 2UR-FSE used in the 2008 LS 600h. It features the same bore and stroke dimensions (3.70 in x 3.52). However, extensive modifications carried out by the IS F engineering team in conjunction with Yamaha's Formula One (F1) engine program resulted in a cast-aluminum intake manifold, new cylinder heads, and titanium intake valves. Additionally the engine features a forged crankshaft, connecting rods and cam lobes. At maximum acceleration above 3400 rpm, the secondary intake opens. Compared with the LS 600h's 2UR-FSE (measured alone without its hybrid-electric motors), the IS F 2UR-GSE has more horsepower and torque at higher rpm, and 17 lb·ft less peak torque (see also Lexus IS F performance specifications).

Lexus IS F 2UR-GSE V8
Lexus IS F dynamometer test

The Lexus IS F features an 8-speed Sport Direct Shift (SPDS) automatic transmission with sequential shift which can lock-up the torque converter from 2nd through 8th gears (see also: Lexus IS transmission specifications). The SPDS is derived from the unit introduced in the 2007 Lexus LS, which was the first vehicle to carry an 8-speed transmission. The SPDS allows for shifts to occur in 0.1 s (100 ms), compared to 0.05 s (50 ms) of F1 race cars. The wheel-mounted paddle shifters allow for gear shifting while steering, and a manual mode can be selected for added control. The 8-speed transmission also improves fuel economy, with lower overall consumption than BMW, Mercedes, and Audi rivals, and avoidance of the U.S. Gas Guzzler Tax.

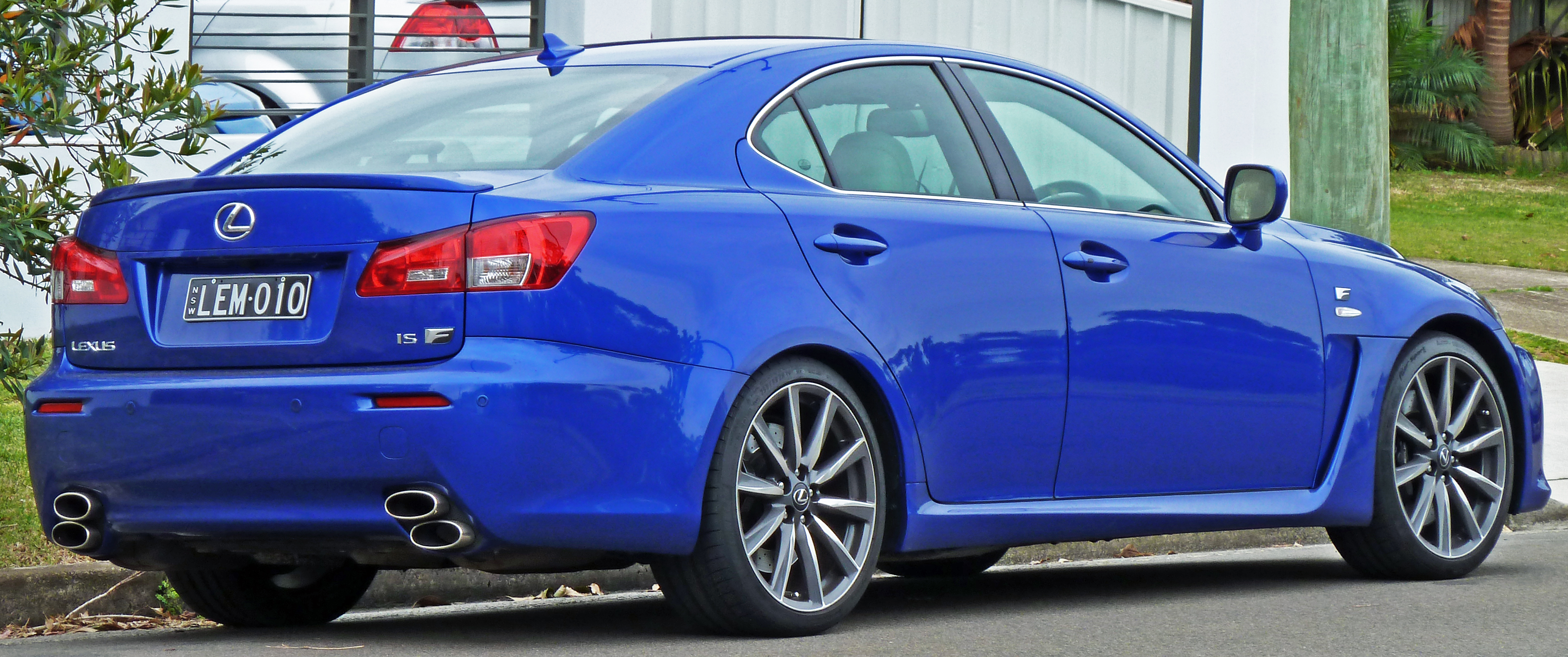
Rear quarter view of the Lexus IS F

The IS F uses an all-electric rack and pinion steering system with a 13.6:1 gear ratio. The drivetrain is linked to a new sport version of Lexus' electronic stability control system (Vehicle Dynamics Integrated Management, or VDIM, featuring three distinct on-off modes). The Lexus IS F comes equipped with Brembo cross-drilled brake rotors (14.2 in front, 13.6 rear) and 6-piston front and 2-piston rear aluminum calipers stamped with the Lexus emblem, along with 19-inch BBS forged aluminum alloy wheels.

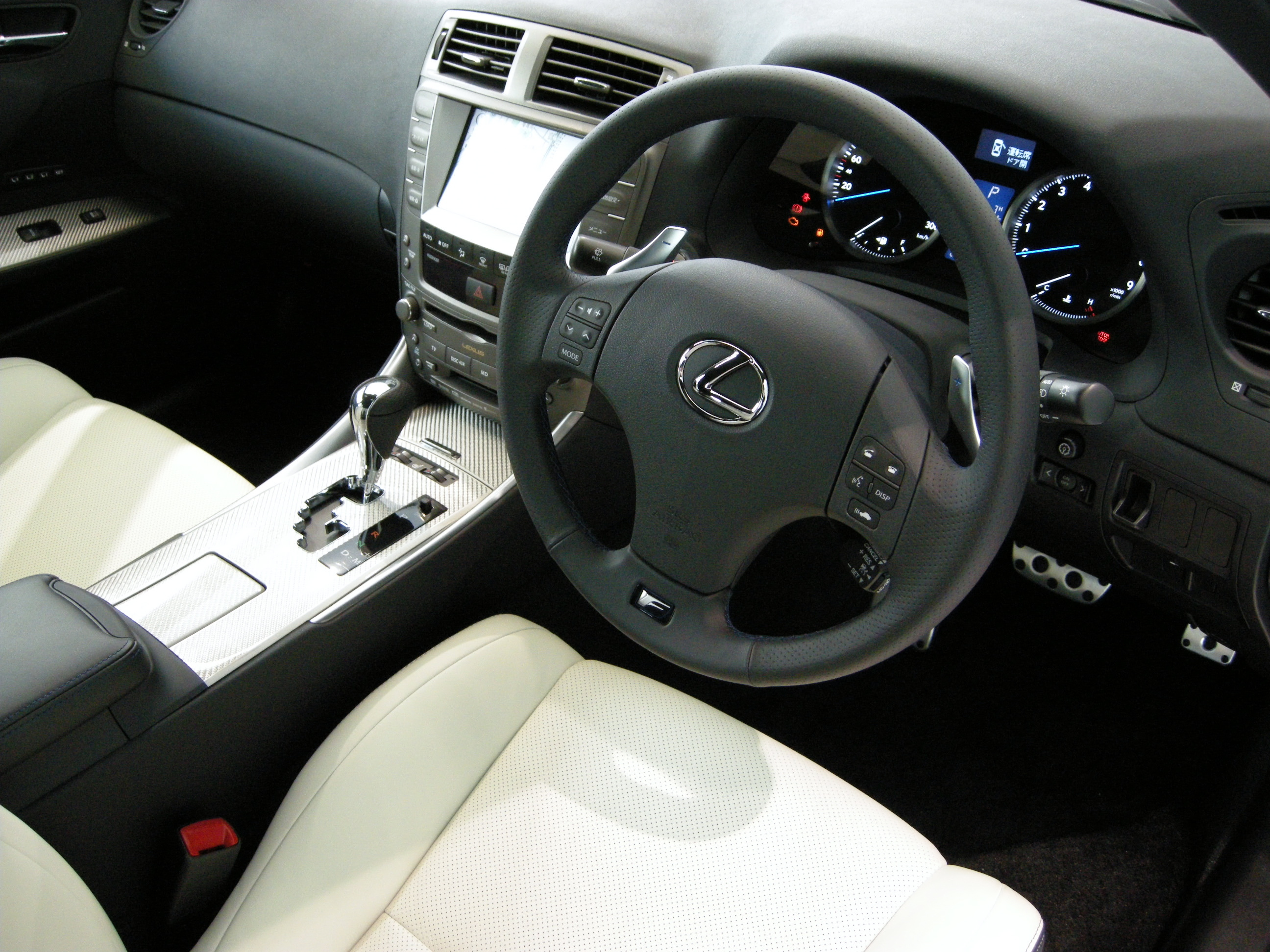
2008 Lexus IS F interior (USE20; Japan)

In October 2007, the IS F premiered in Japan, with a 500-unit yearly target for that country, and a 5,000–6,000 yearly unit target for the U.S. market. By the final model year in 2014, only approximately 11,500 units had been manufactured, with 5,118 sold in the U.S. Top speed was listed at 168 mph (270 km/h). The IS F went on sale in the US in early 2008 with the first 50 IS F units sold as a limited Neiman Marcus special edition. In 2007, the head of Lexus GB stated in an interview that 150 IS Fs would be allocated for the UK market. For 2008, the IS F carried a base price of US$56,000.

For 2010, the IS F added a Torsen limited-slip differential, standard iPod/USB connectivity, Bluetooth streaming audio capability, casual language voice commands, and standard XM Satellite Radio. For the 2011 model year the electric power steering system and suspension were revised, with tweaks to the front and rear spring rates, shock absorber dampening, rear bushings and rear camber angle. An interior update included the addition of the Sport button to the steering wheel and a redesign of the gauge cluster featuring a large central tachometer similar to the Lexus LFA. The exterior adds LED daytime running lights and according to Lexus the 2011 IS F can lap Fuji Speedway in 2 minutes, 3.4 seconds or nearly 2 seconds quicker than before.

=== IS F police car (2009–) ===
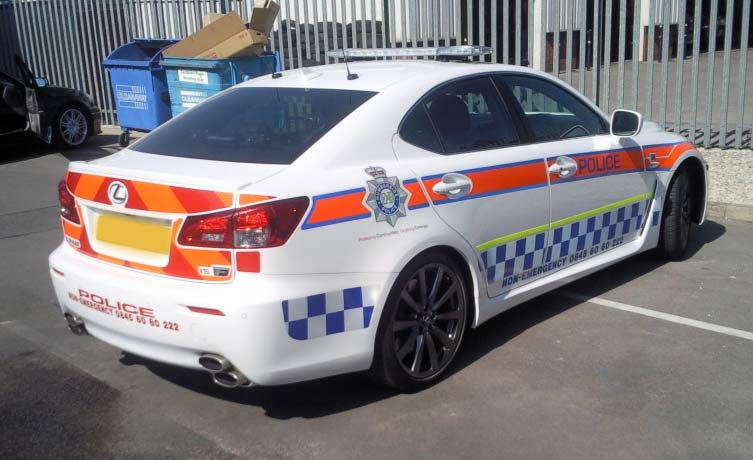
Humberside Police Lexus IS-Force police cruiser

The Humberside Police in the United Kingdom modified an IS F to use as a deterrent to high speed chases. Changes include computer platform to access all police records, 4 video cameras recording road in all directions, 2 hi-tech radio communication systems. The vehicle was used as the 'command car' for Humberside Police's Vehicle Crime Unit.

=== IS F Evolution ===
The IS F Evolution was rumored to be a planned version of the IS F sedan which would feature weight reduction (by 300 lbs), handling modifications, and carbon ceramic brakes, as well as carbon fiber front and rear bumpers, and front fenders. It was rumored to use 245/35R19 front and 275/30R19 tires, and incorporate carbon fiber parts and Recaro racing seats on the interior. The Evolution model never entered production.

=== IS F-Sport ===
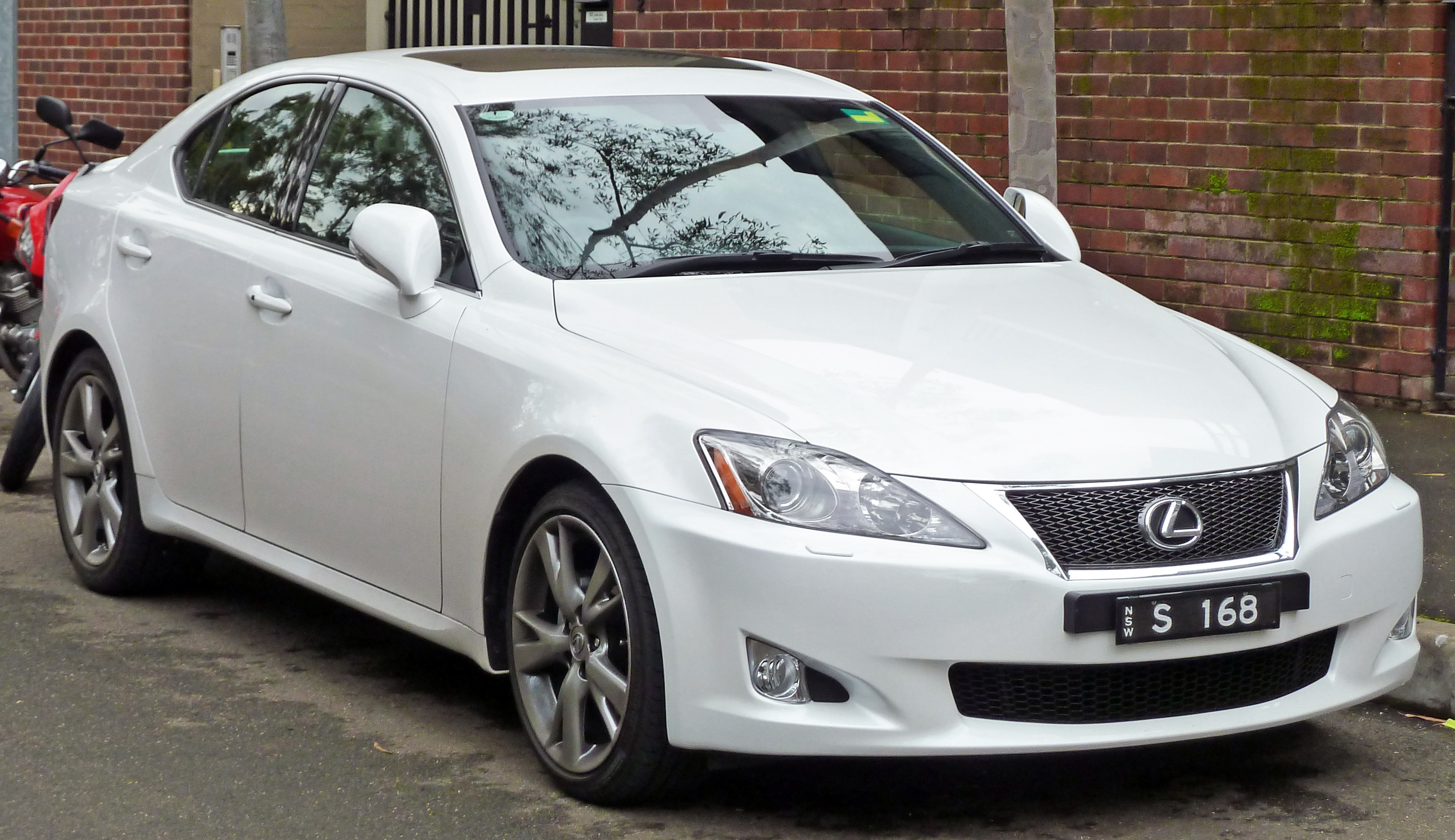
2009–2010 Lexus IS 250 F-Sport (GSE20R; Australia)

At the 2007 SEMA show, Lexus had a formal presence at the aftermarket convention for the first time, and launched a line of "F-Sport" parts and accessories for the IS 250/350. The F-Sport line, including performance and accessory upgrades such as big brake kits, shocks, lowering springs, sway bars, chassis brace, light weight wheels, air intake, exhaust, engine cover, floor mats, shift knobs and also clutch for manual drive, was later expanded to the full IS lineup.

At the 2009 SEMA Show, the F-Sport line also released upgrades for IS 250 AWD and IS Convertible models.

== Limited editions ==
=== Elegant White Interior edition (2007–) ===
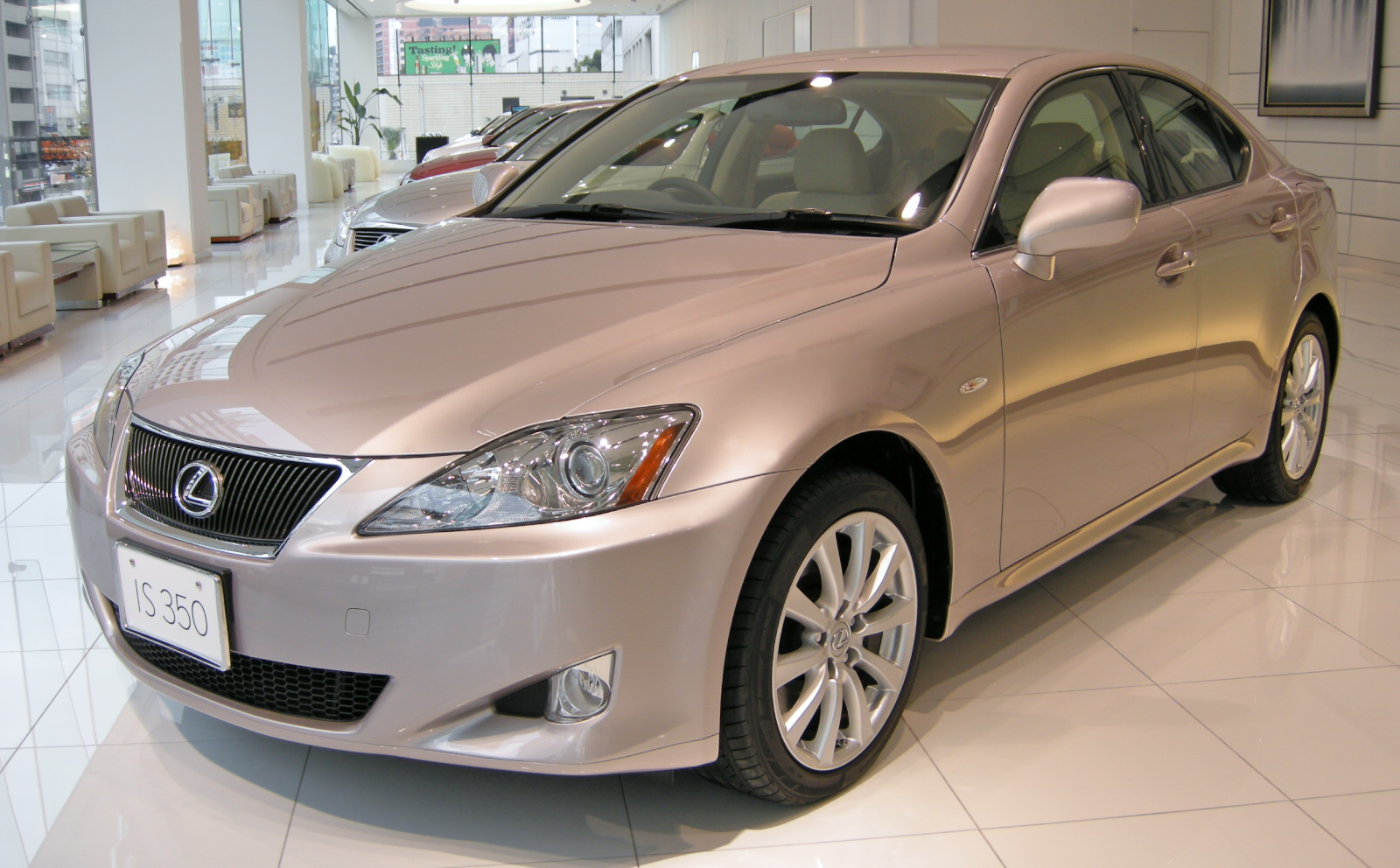
Lexus IS 350 (GSE21; Japan)

It is a limited (700 units) edition of the IS 250 and IS 350 for the Japan market. It included a custom two-tone white and gray leather interior.

=== IS 250 X (2007–) ===
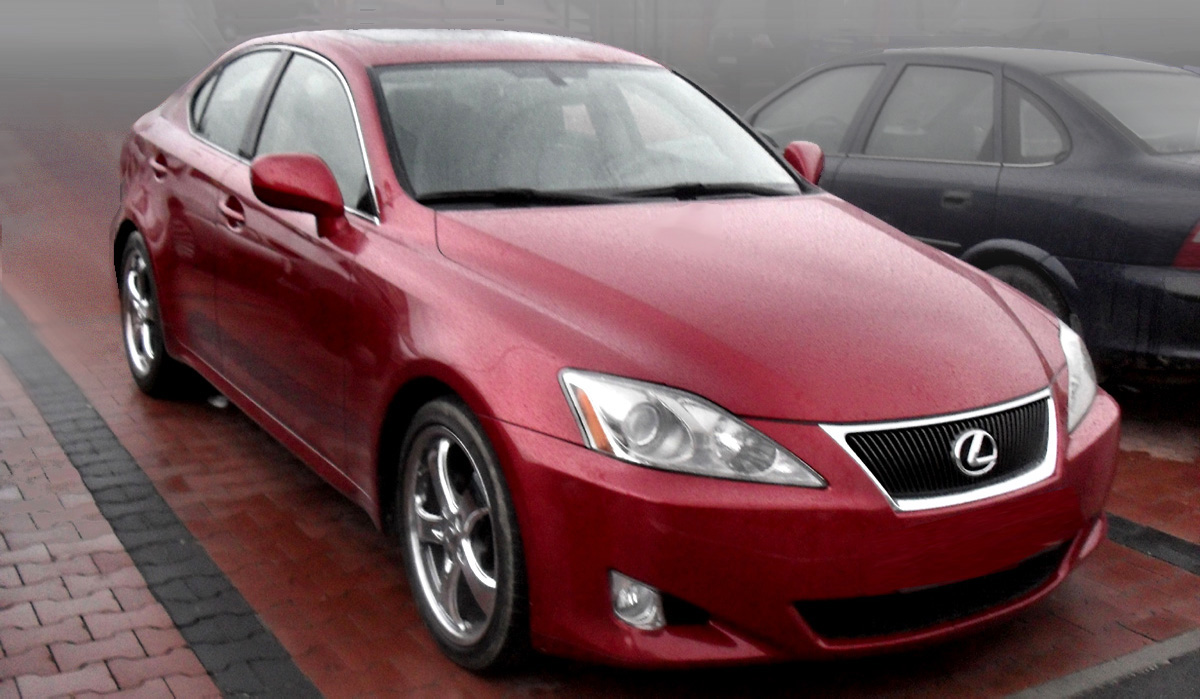
Lexus IS 250 (GSE20) X-Package

Lexus introduced a new badge into its lineup in 2007 – a new "X-Package" which was introduced into a number of countries. In the Australian market, it was introduced to celebrate the sale of the 5000th IS 250 in Australia. The IS 250 X came standard with: sport tuned suspension, exclusive 18-inch alloy five-spoke wheels, premium Mark Levinson 14 speaker stereo, moonroof, satellite navigation, illuminated scuff plates, rear camera and sports pedals, and a front lip spoiler. The "X" also came in 3 colors: Onyx Black, Vermillion Red and Metallic Silver. In order to retain the "exclusive" image, only 260 were released in the 2007 calendar year. The pricing started at A$64,390 for the 6-speed manual and rose to A$66,990 for the 6-speed semi-automatic.

There were a number of changes made to the 2008 IS 250 X model. These included: changes to the steering system resulting in an improved steering feel, modified rear seats to improve rear room and the added choice of a new exterior colour – Arctic Blue. Lexus Australia also announced that 450 units would be released, compared to the 260 released the previous year. Production of the IS 250 X ceased in 2008.

=== Neiman Marcus 2008 Lexus IS F Special Build Sedan ===
It is a limited (50 units) version of the IS F sedan sold by Neiman Marcus. Priced at US$68,000, the Neiman Marcus edition had a custom black with white accented interior with exterior black color. Each vehicle was individually numbered, and the owner also received a training session at the Skip Barber Racing School.

=== IS 250 SR (2008) ===
It is a limited (1000 units) version of the IS 250 for the UK market. It included a full body kit, 17-inch 10-spoke alloy wheels, optional 18-inch Tsuki rims, Worcester Black interior fabric, with optional sports pedals and heated front seats.

=== Red-Edge Black edition (2009–) ===
It is a limited (500 units) edition of the IS 250 and IS 350 for the Japan market. It included a largely black leather interior with red trim.

=== 2010 IS 350 C F-Sport (2010) ===
It is a limited (100 units) version of the IS 350 C with 19-inch alloy wheels, special edition badging, a new front grille, lowered and upgraded sport suspension, larger brakes, and special blue interior stitching on black leather seats.

The vehicle went on sale in late March 2010 for US$57,500.

=== IS SUNRISE (2010) ===
It is a limited version of the IS 250 sedan, designed in conjunction with Spanish design duo Stone Designs as part of Lexus Japan's "Art Works" series, commemorating the fifth anniversary of the launch of Lexus Japan. The IS "Sunrise" model included a multi-tone interior with contrast seat leather hues of white, blue, and gray.

== Concept cars ==
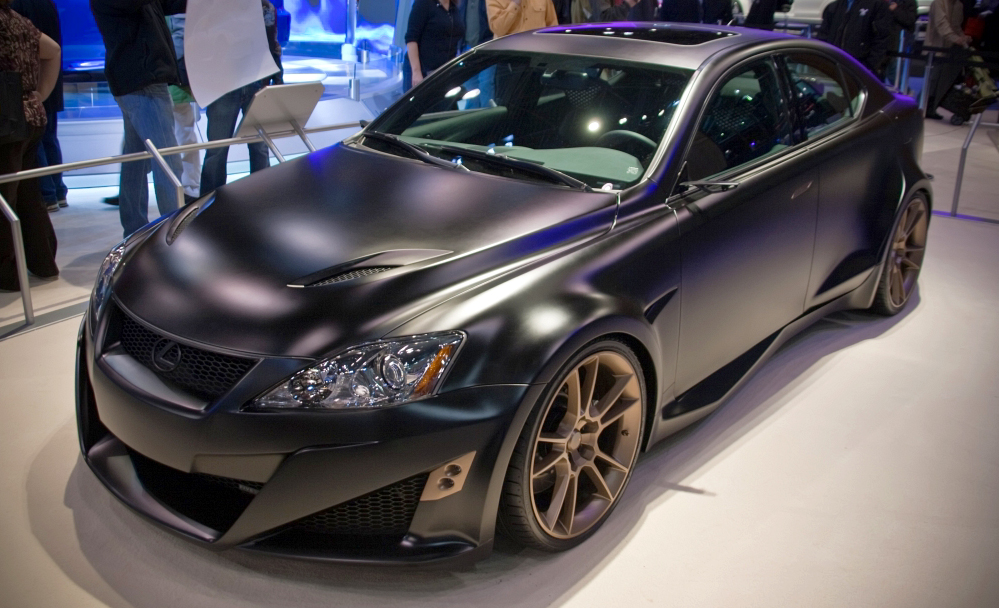
Lexus IS F by Five Axis in the Lexus stand at the New York Auto Show

Lexus has built a handful of concept and one-off models based on the IS. Aftermarket tuners, such as Wald International and FiveAxis, have also produced several one-off IS models, which have been part of the manufacturer's auto show exhibits.

=== IS F Racing Concept (2008) ===
At the 2008 Tokyo Auto Salon, the IS F Racing Concept was shown. Few details were released at the show, other than that the concept was the work of chief engineer Yukihiko Yaguchi who built the concept "just for fun", to show "true driving pleasure", and exhibit a potential IS F race car. The IS F Racing Concept had larger fenders, wheels, and spoilers, in a similar manner as DTM racing cars. Reports at the event suggested that the vehicle was not planned for actual racing; rather instead different IS F models were being prepared for racing. Other reports following the car's unveiling also alleged that the car was actually a rebodied Opel Vectra GTS V8 DTM race car.

The IS F later made its racing debut in VLN competition (see Lexus IS (XE20) in motorsport).

=== IS F Circuit Club Sports (2010) ===
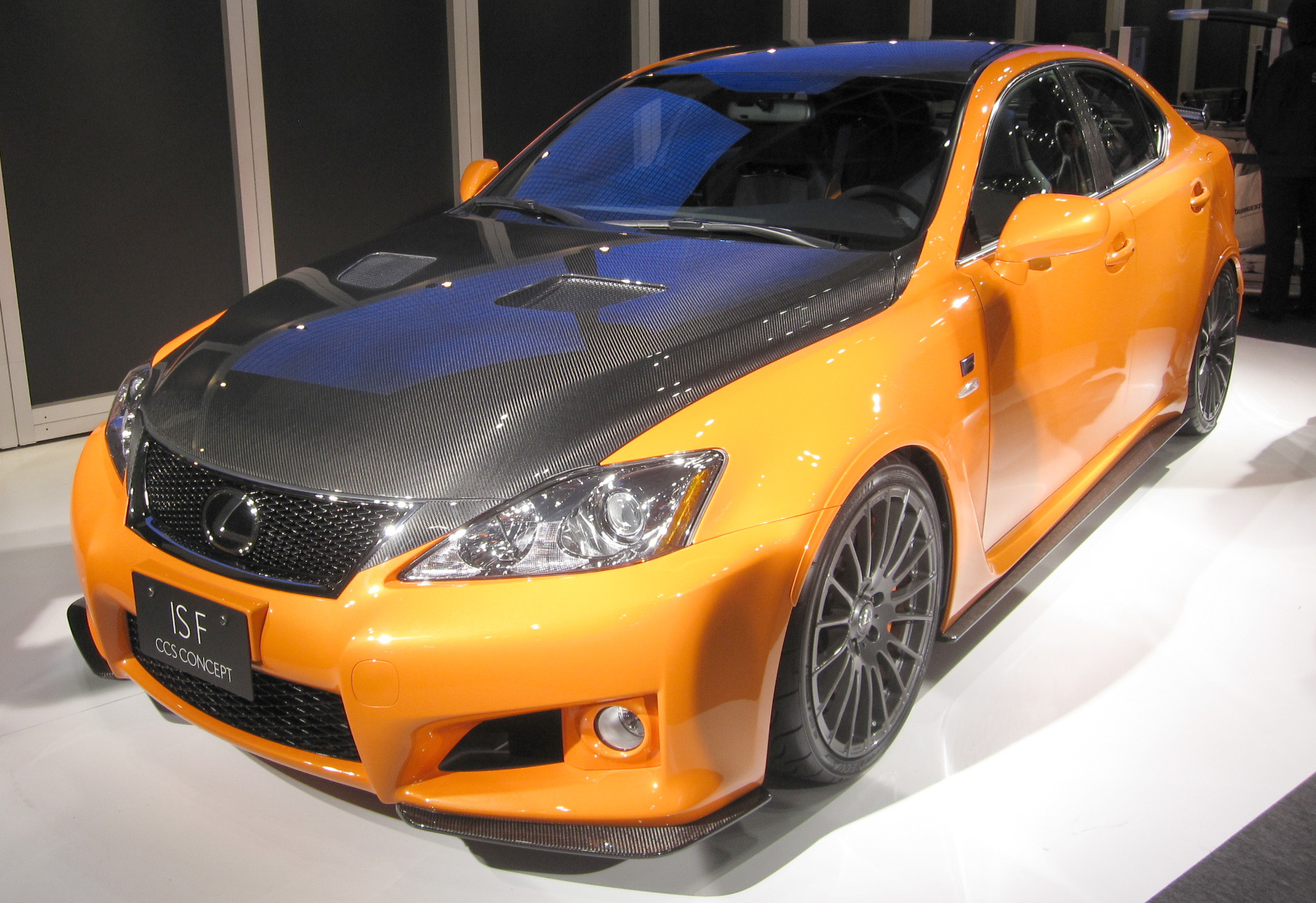
Lexus IS F CCS at the 2010 Tokyo Auto Salon

The CCS is a concept version of the IS F sedan, which later became the basis for a range of aerodynamic and mechanical upgrades for the IS, sold by TRD, called the Circuit Club Sport Package. The concept features a carbon fiber reinforced polymer hood, trunk and rear spoilers, along with a rear titanium muffler, 19-inch magnesium wheels, and modified suspension and brakes. The carbon fiber components were produced using technology developed for the Lexus LFA supercar. The vehicle also featured additional aero parts, a separate bright orange color scheme, and increased engine power to 428 hp (319 kW).

The vehicle was unveiled in the 2010 Tokyo Auto Salon.

== Motorsport ==
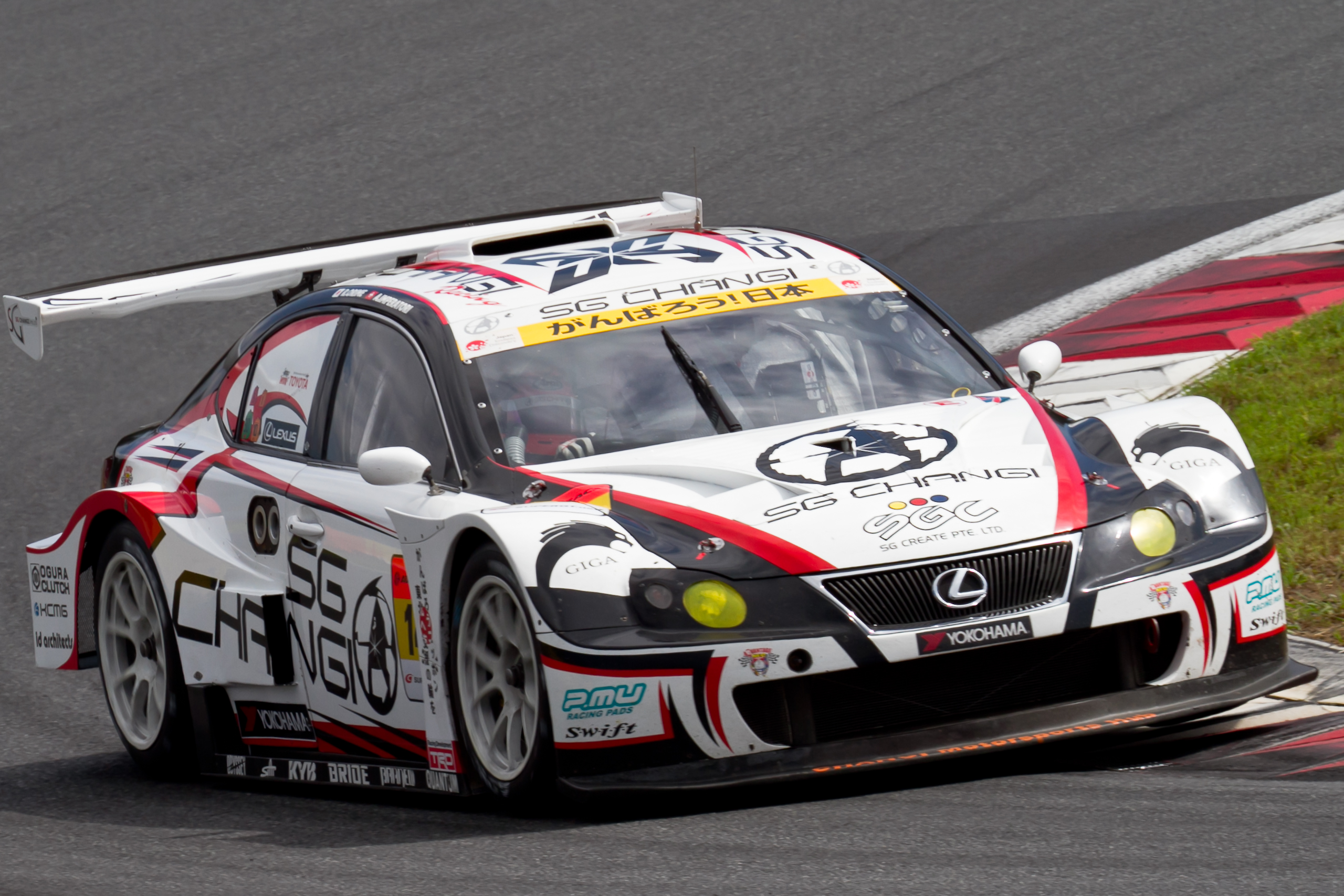
Lexus IS 350 Super GT racer

In 2008, the second generation IS 350 was entered in the Super GT race series in the GT300 class (cars with approximately 300 horsepower). Extensively modified from the factory car, with upgrades including a V8 engine, the No. 19 Team Racing Project Bandoh IS 350 driven by Manabu Orido and Tsubasa Abe achieved its first victory in its fifth race at the Motegi GT300 race. Other IS 350 GT300 competitors included those of the WedsSport and Green Tec/Kumho teams. In 2009, two manufacturer sanctioned Racing Project/Bandoh and Team Reckless/Shift IS 350s were also announced for competition, both equipped with 3.0L V8 engines. The Project Bandoh WedsSport IS 350, driven by Manabu Orido and Tatsuya Kataoka, won both driver and team title in the GT300 class that season.

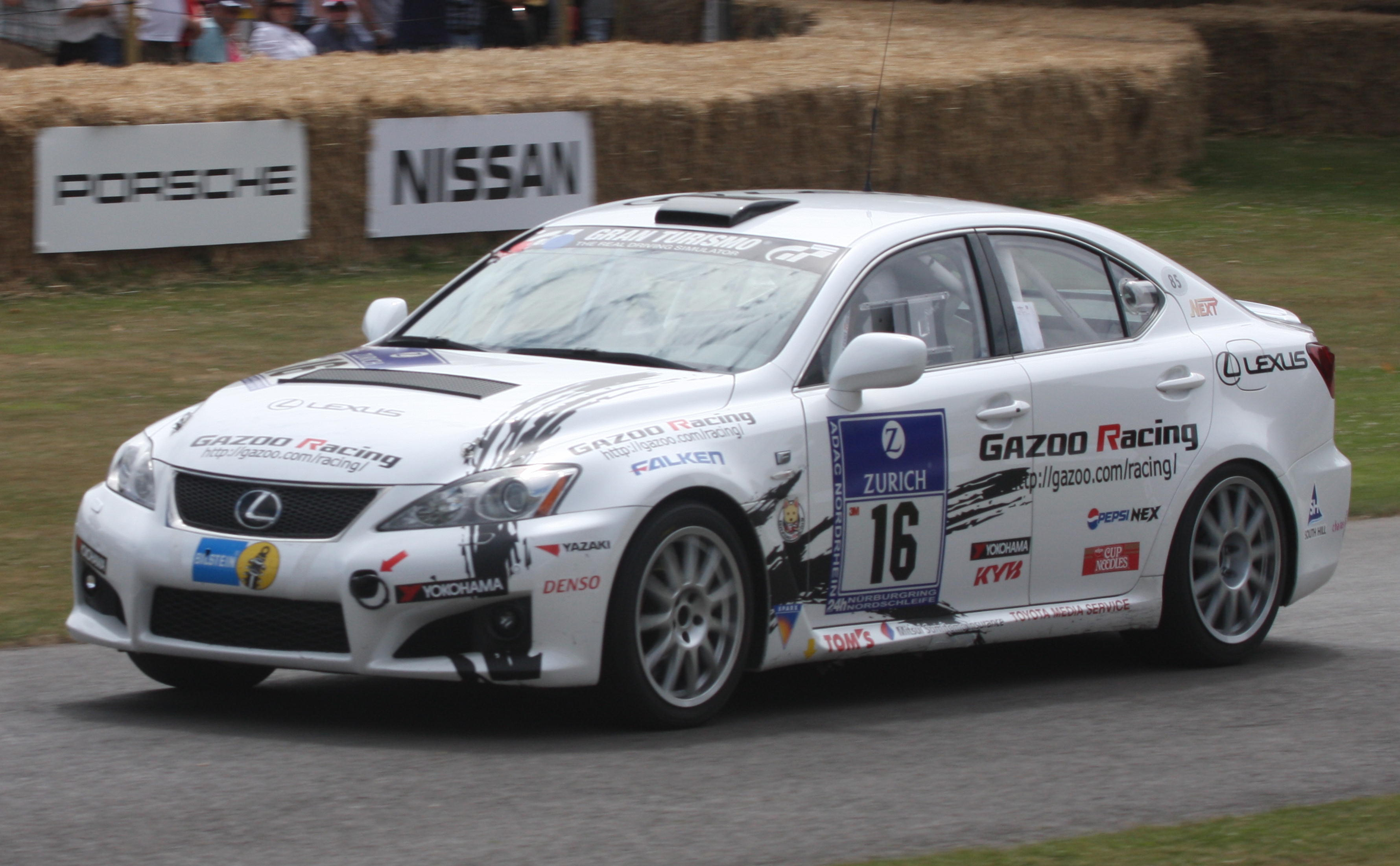
Lexus IS F race car at the Goodwood Festival of Speed

In 2009, Gazoo Racing produced a Lexus IS F VLN racing vehicle, which was entered in the SP8 class of the ADAC-Westfalenfahrt VLN 4h endurance race. The vehicle finished second to the team's Lexus LF-A in the race. The IS F VLN racer was also entered in the 2009 24 Hours Nürburgring race and finished third in the SP8 class. The IS F was also later entered in the DMV Grenzlandrennen VLN 4h endurance race in August 2009 where it won the SP8 class. In Gazoo's win at the DMV Grenzlandrennen VLN race on 29 August 2009, Kazunori Yamauchi, the developer of Gran Turismo series who had little experience in actual motorsport, was also one of their drivers, along with Peter Lyon and Hideshi Matsuda. An IS F driven by Peter Lyon, Hideshi Matsuda, Kazunori Yamauchi, and Owen Mildenhall participated in the 2010 24 Hours Nürburgring and finished in 4th place in the SP8 class, behind the 1st place ranked Lexus LFA.

== Technical specifications ==
Powertrain information for all second generation Lexus IS models are as follows:

Model drivetrain specifications
Model year(s)	Model no(s).	Chassis code(s)	Engine type	Engine code	Transmission(s)	Power@rpm	Torque@rpm
2006–2009	IS 220d	ALE20	2.2 L inline-4	2AD-FHV	6-speed MT	130 kW (170 hp)	400 N⋅m (300 ft⋅lbf) @2600 rpm
2006–	IS 250	GSE20	2.5 L V6	4GR-FSE	6-speed AT/MT	152 kW (204 hp)	251 N⋅m (185 ft⋅lbf) @4800 rpm
2006–	IS 250 AWD	GSE25	2.5 L V6	4GR-FSE	6-speed AT	152 kW (204 hp)	251 N⋅m (185 ft⋅lbf) @4800 rpm
2006–	IS 350	GSE21	3.5 L V6	2GR-FSE	6-speed AT	228 kW (306 hp)	375 N⋅m (277 ft⋅lbf) @4800 rpm
2007–	IS 300	GSE22	3.0 L V6	3GR-FE	6-speed AT	170 kW (230 hp)	300 N⋅m (220 ft⋅lbf) @4400 rpm
2007–2014	IS F	USE20	5.0 L V8	2UR-GSE	8-speed AT	311 kW (417 hp)	503 N⋅m (371 ft⋅lbf) @5200 rpm
2009–	IS 250 C	GSE20	2.5 L V6	4GR-FSE	6-speed AT/MT	152 kW (204 hp)	251 N⋅m (185 ft⋅lbf) @4800 rpm
2009–	IS 350 C	GSE21	3.5 L V6	2GR-FSE	6-speed AT	228 kW (306 hp)	375 N⋅m (277 ft⋅lbf) @4800 rpm
2009–	IS 300 C	GSE22	3.0 L V6	3GR-FE	6-speed AT	170 kW (230 hp)	300 N⋅m (220 ft⋅lbf) @4400 rpm
2010–	IS 200d	ALE20	2.2 L inline-4	2AD-FTV	6-speed MT	110 kW (150 hp)	360 N⋅m (270 ft⋅lbf) @2600 rpm
2010–	IS 350 AWD	GSE26	3.5 L V6	2GR-FSE	6-speed AT	228 kW (306 hp)	375 N⋅m (277 ft⋅lbf) @4800 rpm

=== Transmissions ===
Lexus IS F transmission gear ratios are as follows:

Model	Type	Gear	1	2	3	4	5	6	7	8	Differential	Reverse
IS F	AT	Ratio	4.596:1	2.724:1	1.863:1	1.464:1	1.231:1	1:1.000	0.824:1	0.685:1	2.937	2.18:1

Lexus IS transmission gear ratios are as follows:

Model	Type	Gear	1	2	3	4	5	6	Reverse	Final Drive
IS 250	AT	Ratio	3.54:1	2.06:1	1.4:1	1:1.00	0.71:1	0.58:1	3.17:1	3.91:1
IS 250	MT	Ratio	3.79:1	2.28:1	1.52:1	1.19:1	1:1.00	0.79:1	3.47:1	3.73:1
IS 350	AT	Ratio	3.52:1	2.04:1	1.4:1	1:1.00	0.72:1	0.59:1	3.22:1	4.08:1

== Performance data ==
=== IS F ===
Official and tested performance specifications for the Lexus IS F are as follows:

Engine type	2UR-GSE V8	0-100 km/h (62 mph)	4.6 sec. (official)
Valvetrain	DOHC 4-valves/cylinder	0-100 mph (160 km/h)	10.2 sec. (tested)
Displacement	4,969 cc (303.2 cu in)	1/4 mile (400 m)	12.8 sec. (tested)
Power	311 kW (423 PS; 417 hp) @ 6600 rpm	Lateral acceleration	0.96 g (200 feet (61 m) skidpad)
Torque	503 N⋅m (371 ft⋅lbf) @ 5200 rpm	Top speed	170 mph (270 km/h) (limiter)
0-60 mph (97 km/h)	4.6 sec. (official)	Curb weight	3,825 lb (1,735 kg)

Road & Track tested the IS F in their January 2008 issue, attaining a 0-60 mph (97 km/h) time of 4.4 seconds, a slalom speed of 71.2 mph (114.6 km/h) and an electronically limited top speed of 170 mph (270 km/h). Car and Driver also tested the IS F in 2008 and achieved a 0–60 time of 4.2 seconds. It is also rumored that the IS F can break 200 mph (320 km/h) without the electronic limiter. British television show Top Gear tested the Lexus IS F against the BMW M3. The time for the IS F was of 1'26.9, compared to the M3's time of 1'25.3 around their test track.

=== IS 250/IS 350 ===
Official performance specifications for the IS 350 are as follows:

Engine type	3.5 L 2GR-FSE V6	1/4 mile (400 m)	13.9 sec. (official)
0-60 mph (97 km/h)	5.6 sec. (official)	Top speed	144 mph (232 km/h) (official)

In a February 2007 Road & Track Japanese luxury sports sedan comparison, the IS 350 clocked a 0–60 mph time of 4.9 seconds and a 1/4 mile (~400 m) time of 13.5 seconds at 103.1 mph (165.9 km/h).

Official performance specifications for the IS 250 are as follows:

Engine type	2.5 L 4GR-FSE V6	1/4 mile (400 m)	16.0 sec. (official)
0-60 mph (97 km/h)	7.9 sec. (official)	Top speed	140 mph (230 km/h) (official)

== Awards ==
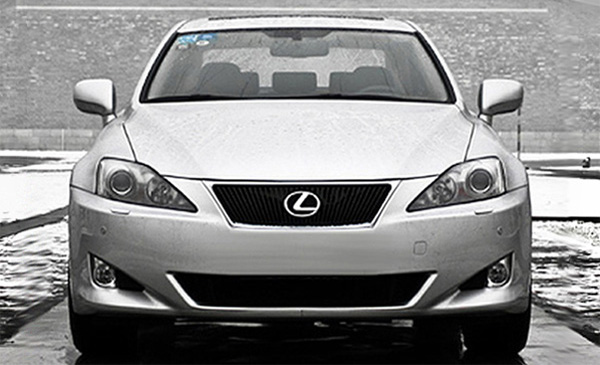
Lexus IS 300 (GSE22; China) with adaptive headlamps

Several awards won by the second generation Lexus IS include J.D. Power best vehicle in the entry luxury class, 2006 Initial Quality Survey, Ward's 10 Best Engines awards in 2006 and 2007 for the IS 350, 2007 IF product design award from the International Forum Design group in Hannover, Germany, and the Canadian Car of the Year Awards' Best New Technology award in 2006. The IS was also the 2007 winner of the Intellichoice/AutoPacific Motorist Choice Award for Aspirational Luxury Cars, referring to the vehicle owners most desired in the luxury segment, and a finalist for Wheels magazine's Car of the Year (COTY) awards and the World Car of the Year (WCOTY) award in 2006.

In November 2009, the Lexus IS F was named Best New Sports / Performance Car over CDN$50,000 for the year by the Automobile Journalists Association of Canada (AJAC). In October 2008, the IS F received a Good Design Award from the Japanese Industrial Design organization. In April 2008, Evo magazine's test of the IS F awarded the vehicle the publication's highest rating of five stars. That same month, AutoWeek's comparison test of the IS F with the GT-R found the former to be the "more satisfying to drive" winner. Also in 2008, Car magazine named the IS F as a finalist for its Performance Car of the Year award.

== Production ==
The second generation Lexus IS is produced in Tahara, Aichi, and Miyawaka, Fukuoka, Japan. In most markets sold, the IS has served as the compact member of the Lexus lineup, and it was the smallest Lexus model until the CT 200h.

Only 486 units of the Lexus IS F were sold in 2012.
