= Yukihiko Yaguchi =

Japanese automotive engineer

- Born: 1955 (age 70–71)
- Education: Tokyo Metropolitan Institute of Technology
- Engineering career
- Discipline: Mechanical engineering
- Significant design: Toyota Supra

Yukihiko Yaguchi (矢口幸彦, Yukihiko Yaguchi) is a Japanese automotive engineer and designer responsible for the design of the first generation Lexus IS F. Born in 1955, he has over 30 years of experience in car design, having worked as head of development and planning for Lexus, where he holds the title of chief engineer. His involvement with Lexus and Toyota is likely how the SC 300 received the renowned inline-6 2JZ-GE from the Mark IV Toyota Supra in a naturally aspirated format. Yaguchi previously worked on the development of the Toyota Chaser and all generations of the Toyota Supra.

== Early life ==
Yukihiko Yaguchi was raised by the Japanese tradition, which is very traditional and strict. At the Tokyo Metropolitan Institute of Technology he studied Mechanical Engineering but did not specialise in a subject. However, long before he studied mechanical engineering it was obvious to him that he would work for the Japanese automobile industry. At TMC (Toyota Motor Company) he found his first job. Yaguchi joined TMC in 1977.

== Career ==
After he graduated from the university, Yaguchi took part in an entry exam at Toyota and started to work with the company. One of his first projects was the design of the Toyota Supra. He worked on the Supra Mark 1, Mark 2, Mark 3 and Mark 4. Yaguchi was involved in the design of a variation of the Toyota Mark II model called the Chaser, which was intended to be a mix between a luxury car and a very sporty car. The car that resulted had the suspension and the engine of the Supra. This car can now be seen as predecessor of the Lexus IS F.

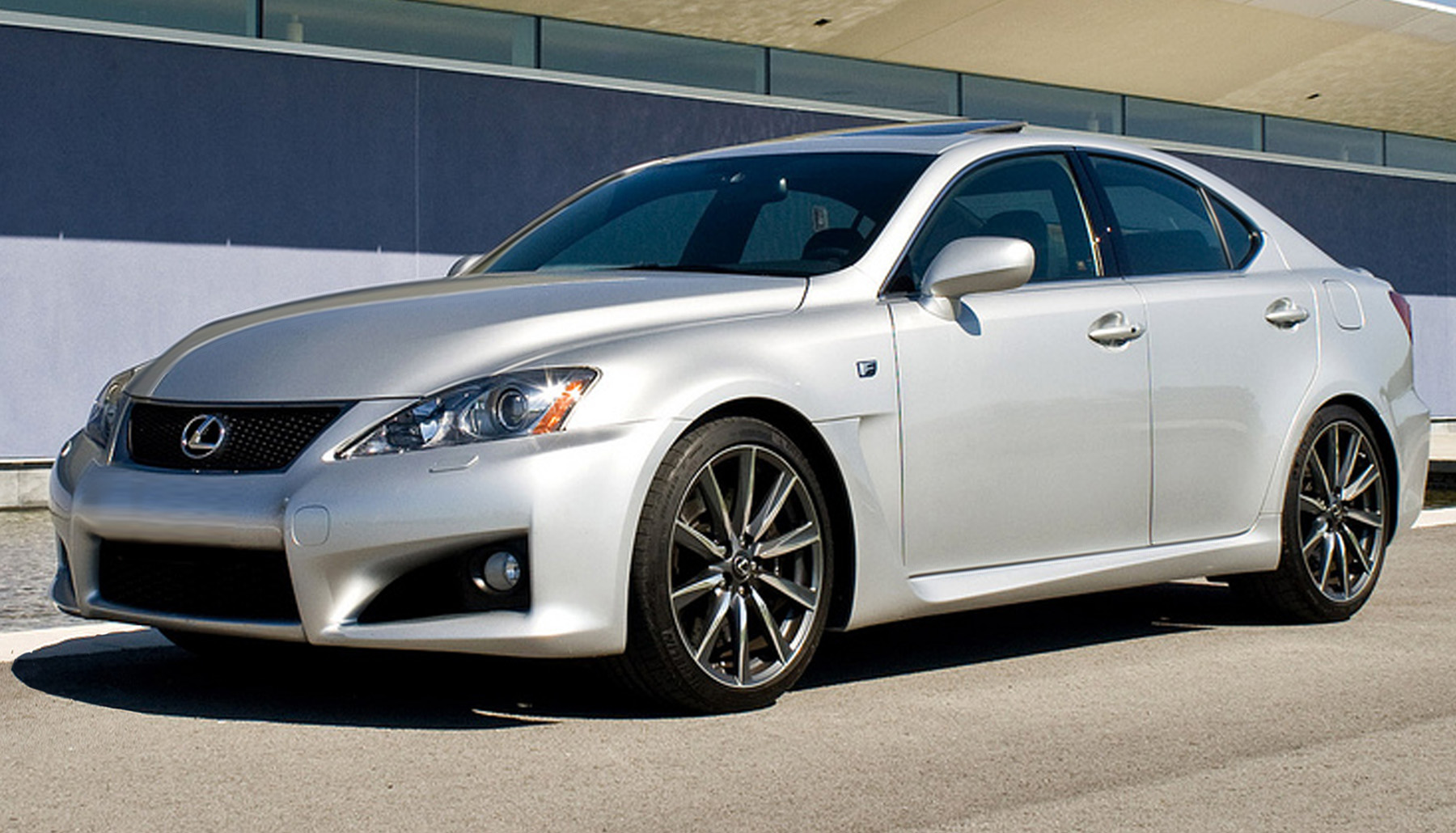
Yukihiko Yaguchi headed the development of the Lexus IS F

While he designed the Supra Yaguchi-san was at the 1980s birth of Lexus as a part the TMC. He spent a lot of time with the new designs for Lexus cars (especially Lexus LS 400) and became head of general development and planning for Lexus. In the year 2006 he was asked to manage the design for the IS F.

The IS F is the sports version of the normal Lexus IS sedan. For the IS F, Yaguchi was inspired by driving in a lot of other cars. In an interview, he said that he loves sports cars, but thinks it's a pity that the most sports cars have 2 seats instead of 4. Exactly that idea was the basis for the IS F.
