= Lexus V8 =

Lexus V8 may refer to:

- Toyota UZ engine, the engine developed for the first Lexus LS400
- Toyota UR engine, the engine that succeeded it in Lexus's flagship sedans
