= Lexus GS =

Executive car series by Lexus, 1991–2020

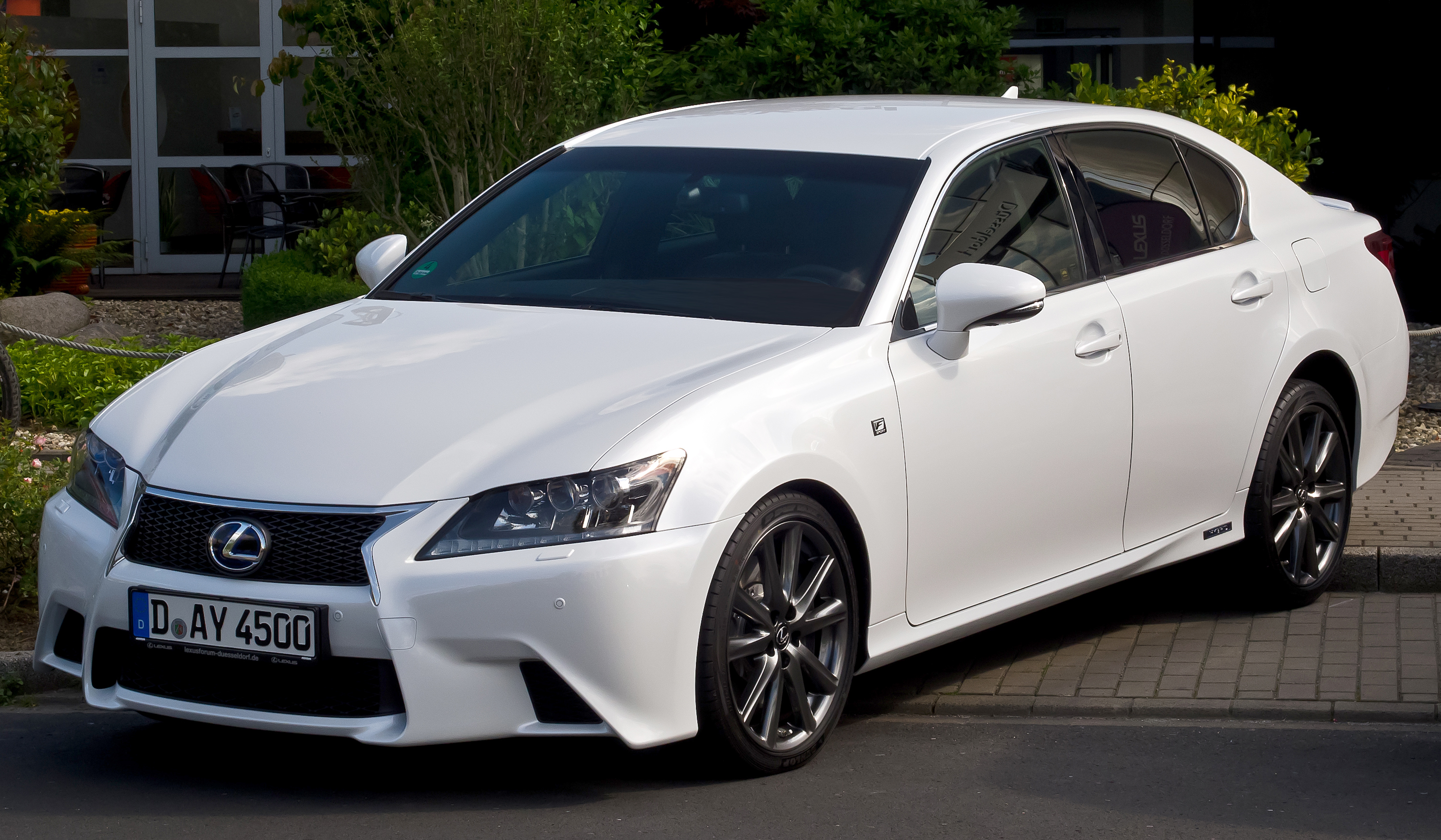
- 2012 Lexus GS 450h F Sport (GWL10, Germany)

Overview
- Manufacturer: Toyota
- Also called: Toyota Aristo (Japan; 1991–2005)
- Production: October 1991 – July 2005 (Toyota Aristo); February 1993 – August 2020 (Lexus GS)
- Model years: 1993–2020

Body and chassis
- Class: Executive car (E)
- Body style: 4-door sedan
- Layout: Front-engine, rear-wheel-drive; Front-engine, all-wheel-drive (except S160 model)
- Related: Toyota Crown (1991–2011)

The Lexus GS (Japanese: レクサス・GS, Hepburn: Rekusasu GS) is an executive car (E-segment in Europe) manufactured by Toyota and marketed by Lexus across four generations — launched in 1991 as the Toyota Aristo (トヨタアリスト, Toyota Ari suto) in Japan and as the Lexus GS for markets outside the Japanese market beginning in February 1993. It continued with the Toyota Aristo name for the Japanese market until January 2005, following the introduction of the Lexus marque in Japan.

Lexus marketed the GS as a performance sedan competing in the mid-luxury class, between its compact executive IS and large/flagship LS. The GS shared its chassis with one of Toyota's longest-running nameplates, the Toyota Crown premium sedans until 2011.

The GS featured six-cylinder engines and rear-wheel drive, with V8 engines offered for all generations. All-wheel drive and hybrid versions debuted in 2005. Previously, all-wheel drive versions were already made available in the Japanese-market S140 series Aristo. The first two generations had a Japanese market equivalent, the Toyota Aristo (aristo is Greek for "the best"), which was sold from 1991 until the Lexus marque's Japanese debut in 2005. Though largely identical in exterior and interior design, the GS and the Aristo differed in their engine and transmission combinations as well as equipment packages. The GS name stands for Grand Sedan. However, some Lexus importers use the backronymic name, Grand Sport.

The first generation Lexus GS began sales in the United States, Europe and selected Asian markets in 1993. It was originally introduced with an inline-six engine and exterior bodywork designed by Italdesign Giugiaro. The second generation model premiered in 1997, using a new platform, in-house styling, and adding a V8 version for the first time outside Japan. The third generation GS, which premiered globally for the 2006 model year, was produced in V6, V8, and hybrid versions, the latter known as the GS 450h. The third generation models were the first GS sedans to be badged as such in the Japanese market.

The fourth generation Lexus GS premiered in August 2011 at the Pebble Beach Concours d'Elegance, where models introduced included the V6-powered GS 350, hybrid GS 450h, and performance-tuned F Sport variants. A lower-displacement V6 model, the GS 250, premiered at the Auto Guangzhou Exhibition in November 2011, targeted at Asian and European markets. In some markets such as North America and Asia, the GS shares the mid-size sedan category in the Lexus lineup with the front-wheel drive ES, serving as its rear-wheel-drive counterpart.

The GS was replaced in Europe by the Lexus ES from December 2018. The seventh generation ES is the first to be sold in Europe, replacing the GS in spite of being a front-wheel drive car. It went on sale from September 2018 in Russia, Turkey and other CIS markets and from December 2018 in Western and Central Europe. Production ended in August 2020.

== First generation (S140; 1991) ==
First generation
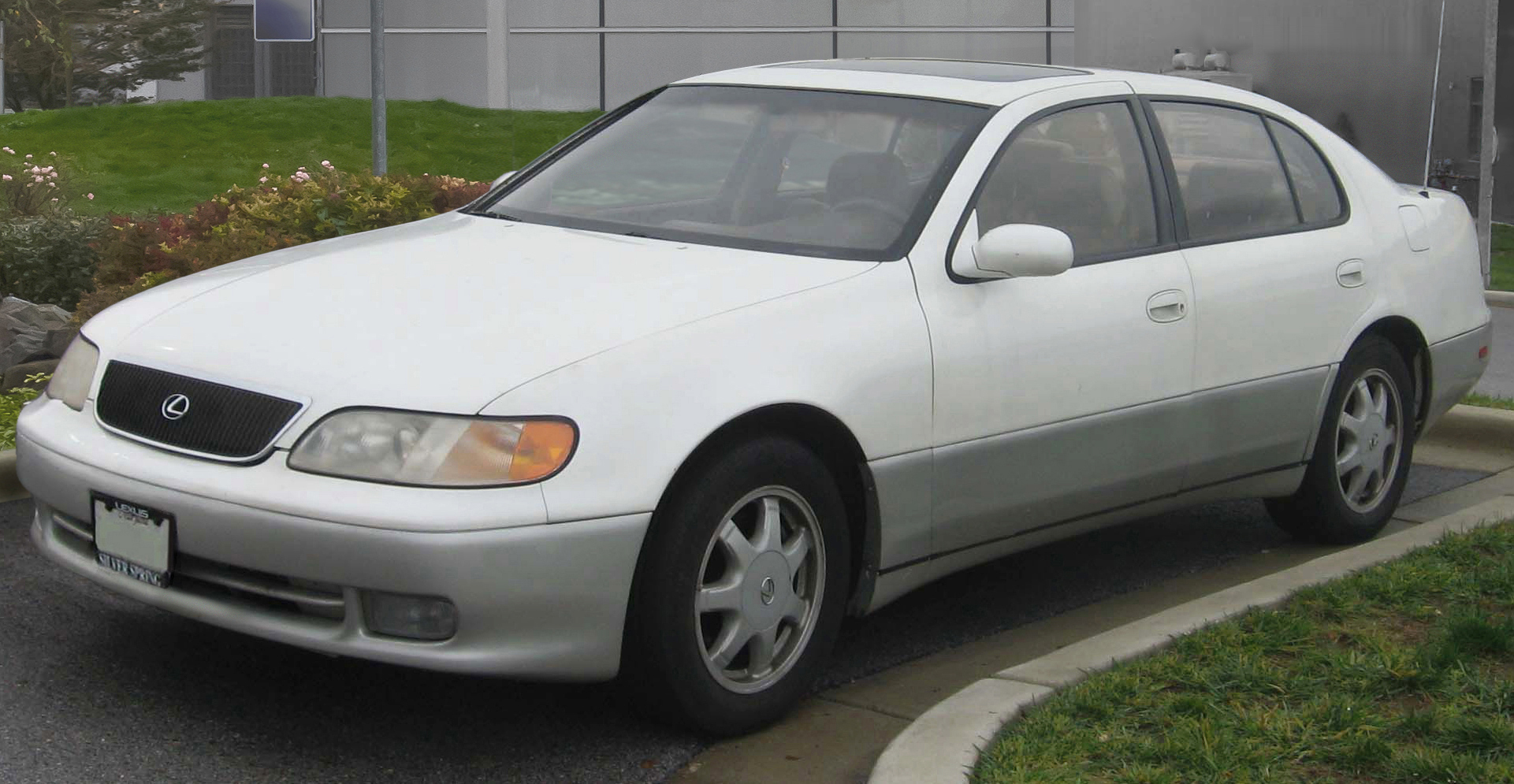
- Lexus GS 300 (JZS147, US)

Overview
- Model code: S140
- Also called: Toyota Aristo (Japan)
- Production: October 1991 – July 1997 (Toyota Aristo); February 1993 – July 1997 (Lexus GS)
- Assembly: Japan: Tahara, Aichi (Tahara plant)
- Designer: Giorgetto Giugiaro at Italdesign (1988)

Body and chassis
- Layout: Front-engine, rear-wheel-drive; Front-engine, all-wheel-drive
- Related: Toyota Crown Majesta (S140)

Powertrain
- Engine: 3.0 L 2JZ-GE I6; 3.0 L 2JZ-GTE I6 (turbo); 4.0 L 1UZ-FE V8
- Transmission: 4-speed A340E (1991–97 Aristo 2JZ-GTE) / A341E (1993–95 GS 300) automatic; 5-speed A350E automatic (1996–97)

Dimensions
- Wheelbase: 2,779 mm (109.4 in)
- Length: 4,950 mm (194.9 in)
- Width: 1,796 mm (70.7 in)
- Height: 1,400–1,420 mm (55.1–55.9 in)

Italdesign Giugiaro began the first design drawings of the GS 300 in 1988. The design firm aimed to produce a deluxe sedan which did without the numerous exterior features and detailing found on existing Japanese premium sedans, in favor of a more simplified, European-style appearance. The vehicle's exterior styling blended elements of the then-current Lexus LS flagship and SC performance coupe in a rounded, aerodynamic wedge-like shape which featured a high rear decklid and longer and wider proportions than rival vehicles. The exterior produced a drag coefficient of Cd=0.31. Color schemes included single-tone bumper and body finishes, along with dual-tone schemes. Similarities with an Italdesign concept car which debuted in 1990, the Jaguar Kensington, led some observers to suggest that the GS 300 was derived from its design (which was also used for the Daewoo Leganza), though Italdesign stated that the GS 300 was developed earlier. Equipped with an independent, double-wishbone suspension setup at both front and rear ends, Italdesign's sedan design first appeared in Toyota Aristo form in Japan in October 1991.

Manufactured at Toyota's Tahara assembly plant in Japan, production of the Aristo involved more automation than previous vehicles built at the Tahara factory; robots performed 4,200 welds on each body, while only eight spot welds were performed by hand.

Toyota of Japan offered two straight-six engine options for the Japanese market Aristo—the 3.0Q and 3.0V. The 3.0Q (JZS147) featured the 2JZ-GE engine which produced 169 kW (227 hp), while the Aristo 3.0V (JZS147) was equipped with a 24-valve twin-turbo 2JZ-GTE engine which produced 205 kW (275 hp). The Aristo was available at Toyota Auto Store as the top-level luxury sedan, positioned above the Chaser and Toyota Vista Store above the Cresta. In 1992, a third model, the V8-powered 4.0Zi-Four (UZS143), joined the Aristo lineup. It came installed with iFour all-wheel drive and a 186 kW (249 hp) 1UZ-FE engine.

Production of the export Lexus GS 300 (JZS147) began on 22 February 1993. For Lexus, The GS was placed above the front-wheel drive ES luxury sedan with its superior drivetrain setup, power and available amenities. Lexus only offered the GS with the 3.0-liter 2JZ-GE straight-six, producing 169 kW (227 hp) and 285 N⋅m (210 lb⋅ft) of torque.

For the interior, the GS 300 featured walnut wood trim on the center console, leather seating, an automatic tilt-and-telescoping steering wheel, and the option of a Nakamichi premium stereo system. Driver and front passenger airbags were standard. A moonroof, remote 12-CD auto changer, and traction control (TRAC – left hand drive vehicles only) were options.

The GS was intended to take the price position of the original LS 400 flagship, which had moved upmarket since its 1989 launch. By the time of the GS 300's debut, the US$35,000 (equivalent to $78,006 in 2025) initial base price of the LS in the United States had climbed to US$47,000 (equivalent to $104,751 in 2025), while the GS 300 at debut carried base price of US$38,000 (equivalent to $84,692 in 2025). However, sales of the GS 300 were modest, with 1993 seeing the greatest sales at 19,164 sold that year. Sales dropped in later years as the Japanese yen rose in value against the dollar and made the vehicle more expensive than its rivals. Additionally, more powerful V8 sport sedans provided strong competition. By 1997, the price of the GS 300 had risen to US$46,000 (equivalent to $92,257 in 2025). Production of the first generation GS sedan ended in July 1997.

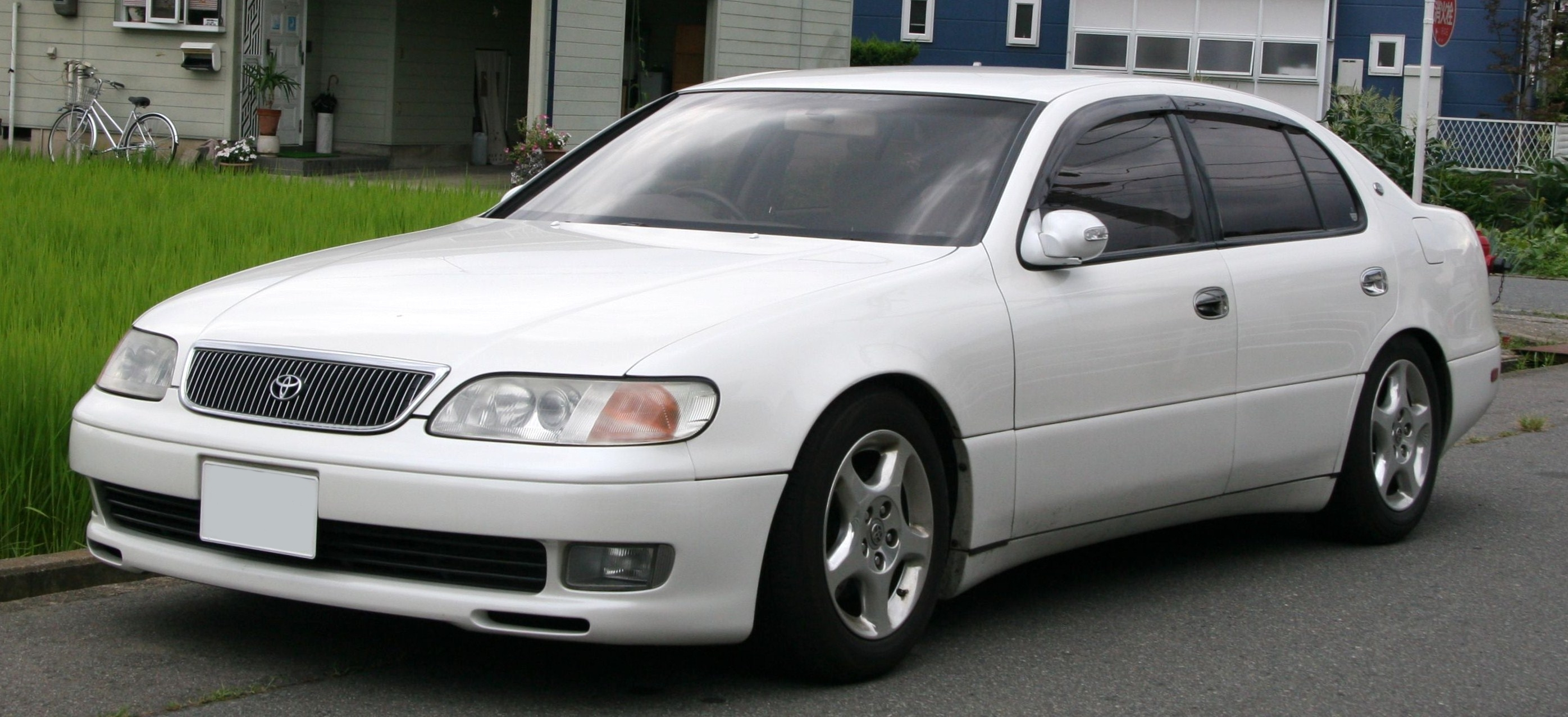
Toyota Aristo 3.0 Q (JZS147, Japan)

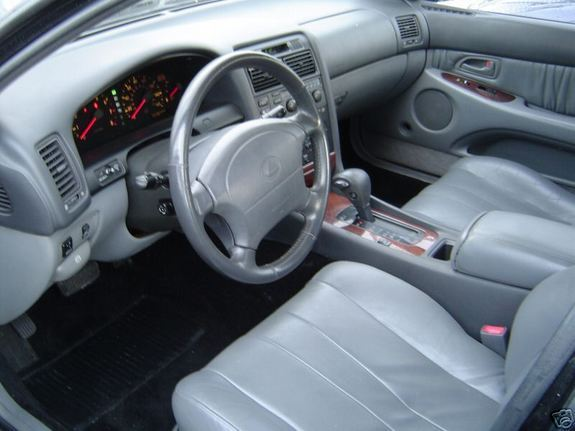
Lexus GS 300 interior (JZS147)

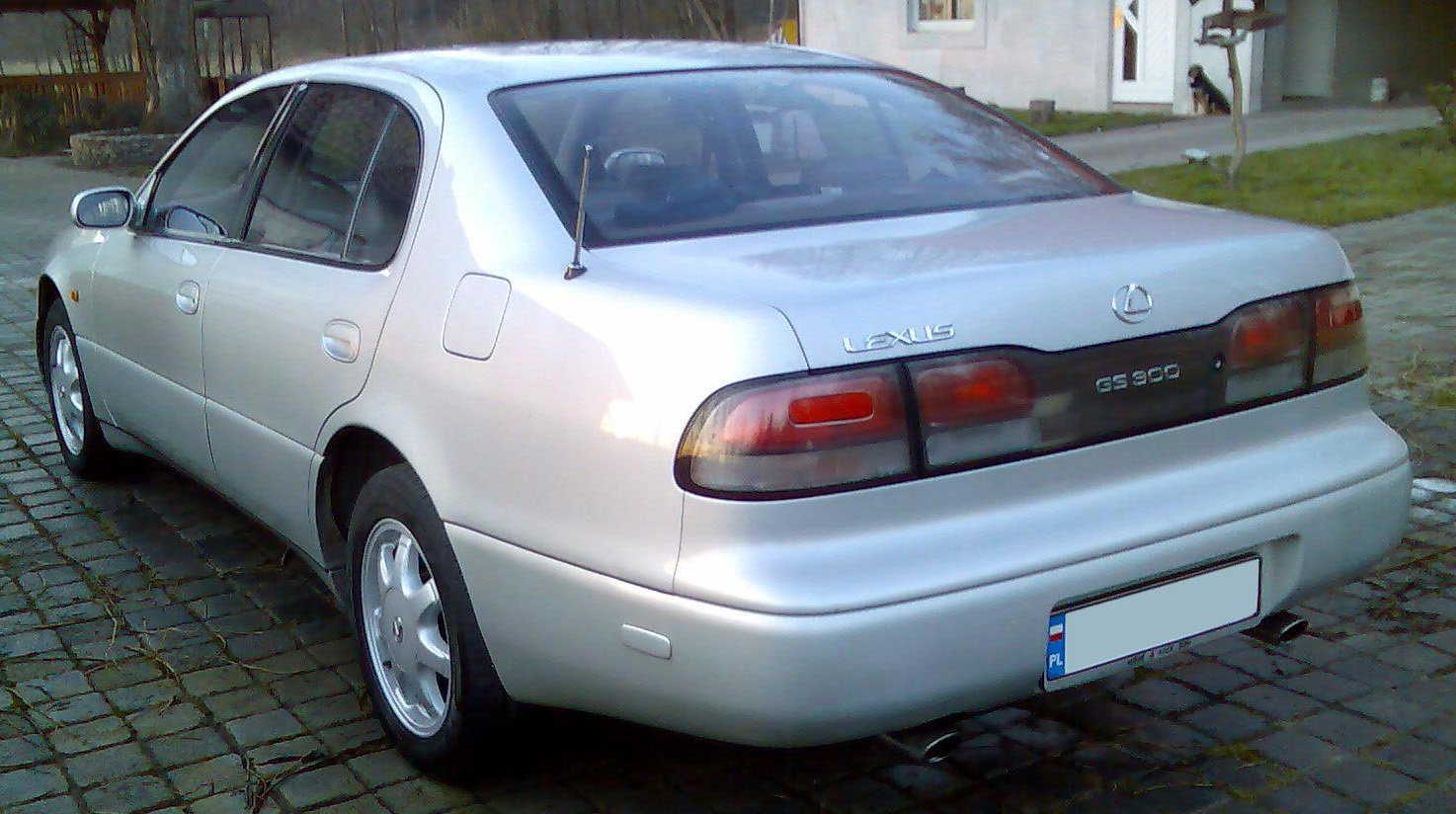
1993–1997 GS 300 (JZS147, Europe)

== Second generation (S160; 1997) ==
Second generation
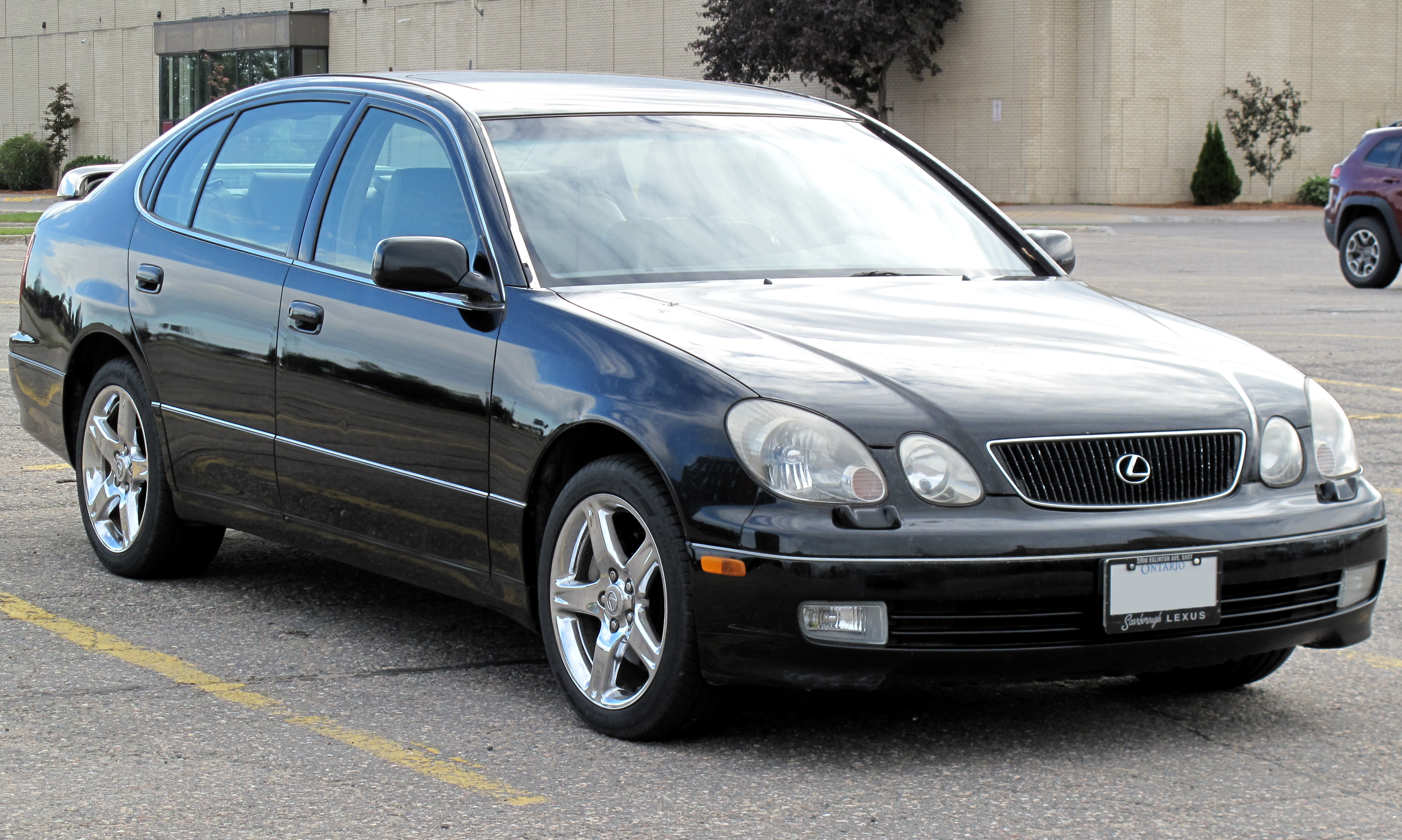
- 1998 Lexus GS400 (UZS160, US)

Overview
- Model code: S160
- Also called: Toyota Aristo (Japan)
- Production: August 1997 – December 2004 (Lexus GS); August 1997 – July 2005 (Toyota Aristo)
- Model years: 1998–2005
- Assembly: Japan: Tahara, Aichi (Tahara plant)
- Designer: Akihiro Nagaya (1995)

Body and chassis
- Layout: Front-engine, rear-wheel-drive
- Related: Toyota Crown (S150)

Powertrain
- Engine: 3.0 L 2JZ-GE I6; 3.0 L 2JZ-GTE I6 (turbo); 4.0 L 1UZ-FE V8 (export only); 4.3 L 3UZ-FE V8 (export only)
- Transmission: 4-speed A340E automatic; 4-speed A341E automatic (JZS161); 5-speed A650E automatic (JZS160, UZS160, UZS161)

Dimensions
- Wheelbase: 2,799 mm (110.2 in)
- Length: 4,806 mm (189.2 in)
- Width: 1,801 mm (70.9 in)
- Height: 1,420–1,440 mm (55.9–56.7 in)
- Curb weight: 1,680 kg (3,703.8 lb)

=== 1997–2000 ===
In 1993, after sales commenced for the first generation S140 series, development began on the successor under the internally known codenamed S160. The design process began under chief engineer Yasushi Nakagawa in May 1994 and by November 1995 after 18 months of design work, the final production design by Akihiro Nagaya was approved by the executive board. In January 1997, Lexus debuted the "High Performance Sedan" (HPS) concept at the Detroit Auto Show, previewing the design direction for the redesigned GS.

In August 1997, the second generation Toyota Aristo was launched in Japan, codenamed JZS160 (S300 version) for models with 2JZ-GE engines and JZS161 (V300 version) for those with 2JZ-GTE twin-turbocharged engines, remaining exclusive to the former Auto Store network that was combined with Vista Store and renamed Toyota Netz Store Japanese dealerships. VVT-i was now standard, resulting in an increase of torque. The twin-turbocharged version was available with electronic four-wheel steering, VSC electronic stability control and an automatic transmission with a tiptronic manual sequential mode controlled by buttons on the steering wheel.

The second generation sedans used a new front-engine, rear-wheel drive midsize platform, also featured in the Japanese-market Toyota Crown. The new model's styling was produced in-house, and featured quadruple headlights (the interior two of which were elliptical) in a fashion similar to the Lexus SC coupe. It had a drag coefficient of Cd=0.30. Inside, electroluminescent Optitron gauges were offered for the first time, along with an upgraded stereo system for V300 versions. For export markets, the second generation GS began production in the JZS161 body style on 4 August 1997 and was officially launched in October 1997.

Lexus offered the GS 300 once again and featured a slightly revised version of the previous generation's 3.0-liter straight-six now producing 168 kW (225 hp) and 305 N⋅m (225 lb⋅ft) of torque. Answering customer requests for more power, the American market GS 400 (UZS160) was equipped with the 4.0-liter 1UZ-FE V8 that produced 224 kW (300 hp) and 420 N⋅m (310 ft⋅lb) of torque. Both models featured a five-speed automatic transmission with the GS 400 receiving steering wheel shift buttons. As with the S140 series, no turbocharged variants were offered outside Japan. The 5.7 second 0–60 mph (0–97 km/h) time of the GS 400 prompted Lexus marketing to claim that the GS was the world's fastest production sedan at its introduction in 1997.

Lexus promoted the arrival of the second generation GS sedan with the tagline, "Something Wicked This Way Comes". Compared to its predecessor, the second generation GS sedan was a much bigger success, with sales reaching 30,622 vehicles in its first year, increasing in the second, and stabilizing at 28,079 vehicles by 2000. Lexus would keep the second generation vehicle in its lineup for eight years, a longer duration than the prior generation. The U.S. base price for the GS 300 and GS 430 averaged approximately US$38,000 and US$47,000 respectively.

The GS was Motor Trend's Import Car of the Year for 1998. It also made Car and Driver magazine's Ten Best list for 1998 through 2000. In IIHS frontal crash testing the 1999 and newer GS was given a "Good" overall score.

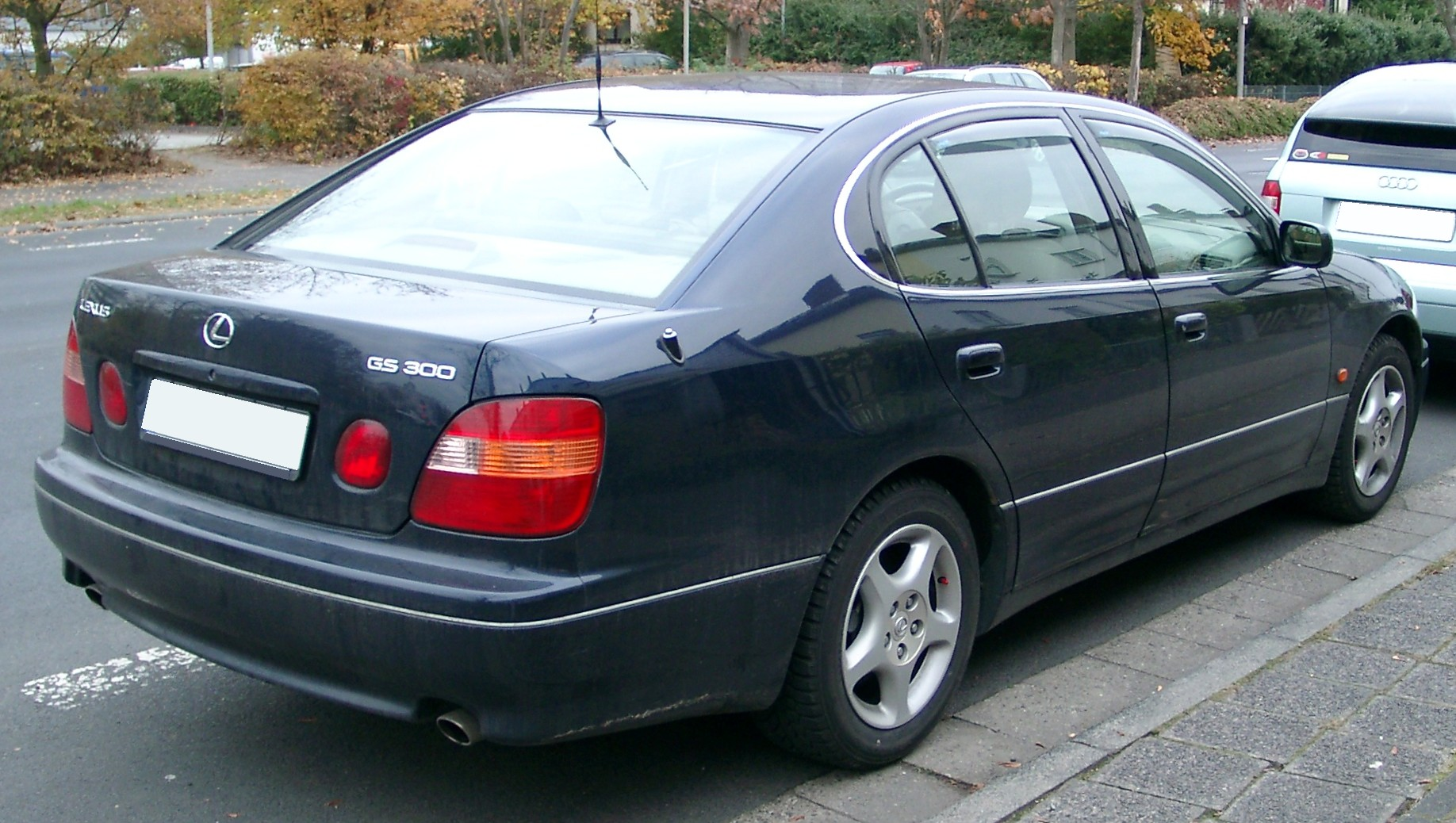
Pre-facelift Lexus GS 300 (Europe)

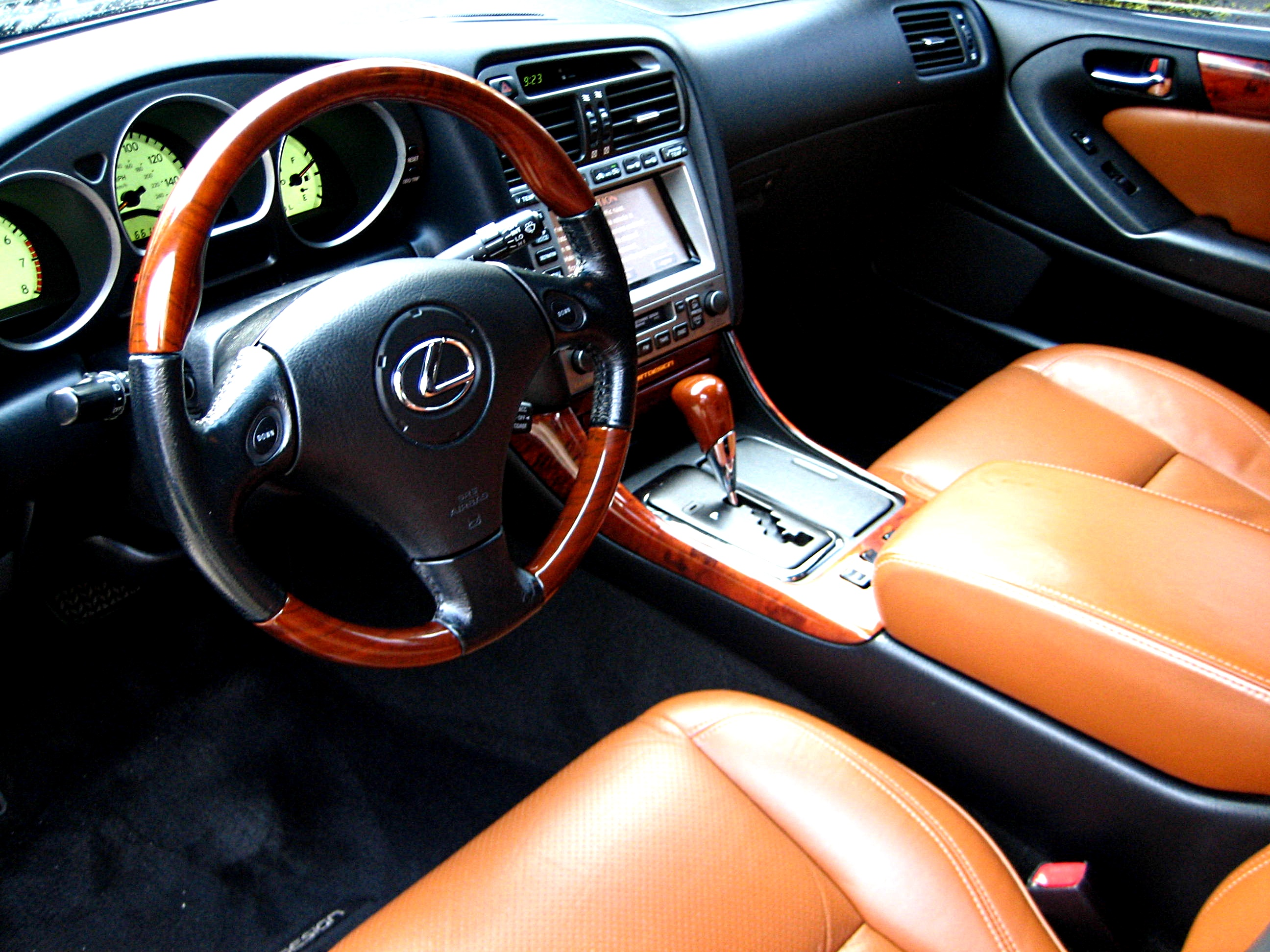
2003–2004 GS 300 interior (JZS160)

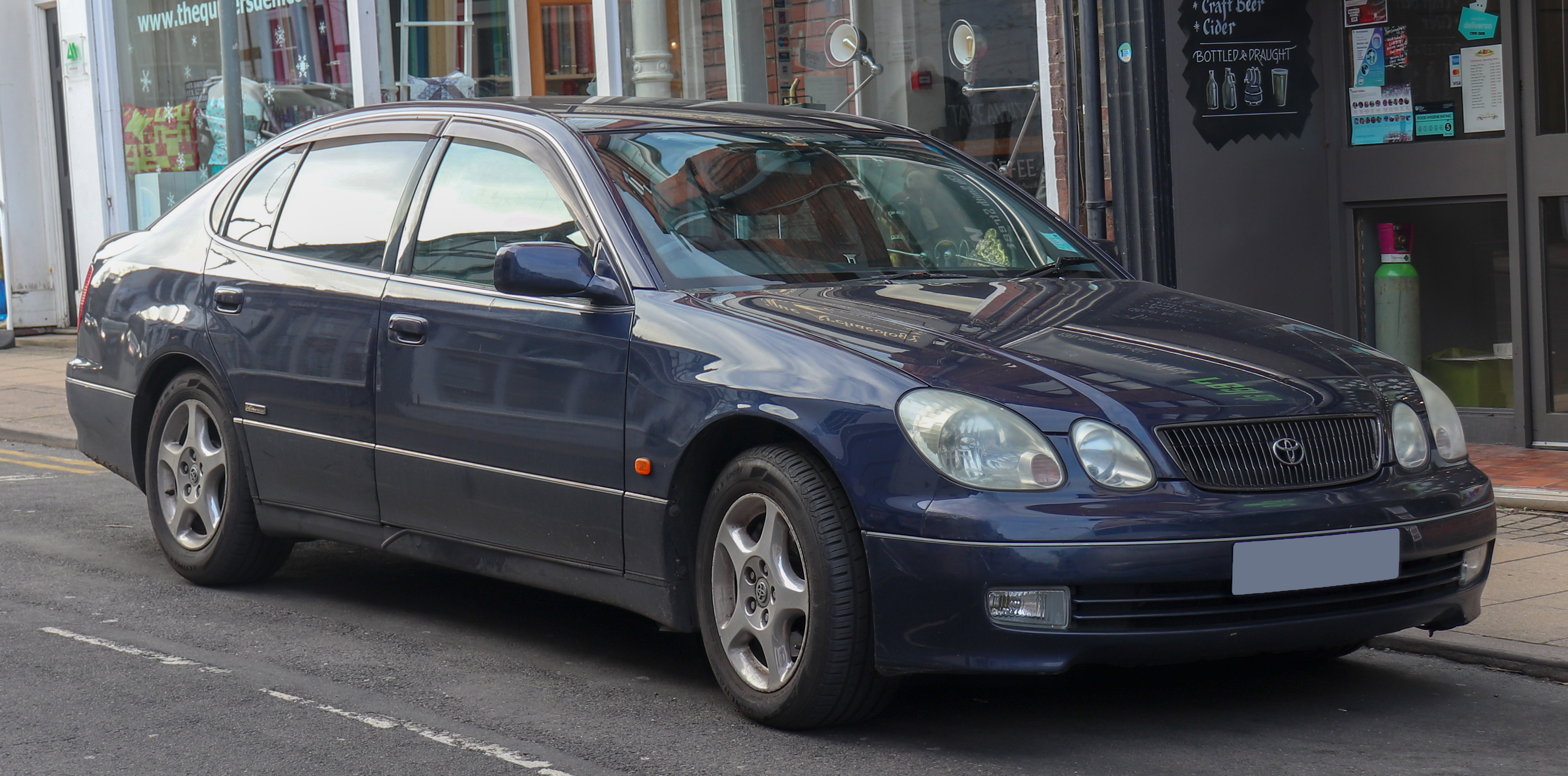
1999 Toyota Aristo V300 Vertex Edition (JZS160, Japanese version in the UK)

=== 2000–2005 ===
A facelift in 2000, for the 2001 model year was the only major design change of the second generation GS. There was a slightly revised grille, revised tail lights, and subtly tinted headlamps on the front end. Xenon headlamps became standard equipment with the V8 engine and optional on six-cylinder cars. More interior wood trim was added, and steering wheel shift buttons were added to the GS 300. The V8 engine also received a 0.3-liter increase in displacement, so the model designation changed to GS 430 (Toyota type code UZS161). Peak power was unchanged, but torque increased to 441 N⋅m (325 lb⋅ft). The GS 430 took 5.7 seconds to go from 0–97 km/h (0–60 mph).

The Aristo was the last production car that used the twin turbocharged 2JZ-GTE motor, continuing 3 additional years after the Toyota Supra, the only other vehicle featuring the 2JZ-GTE, was discontinued in 2002.

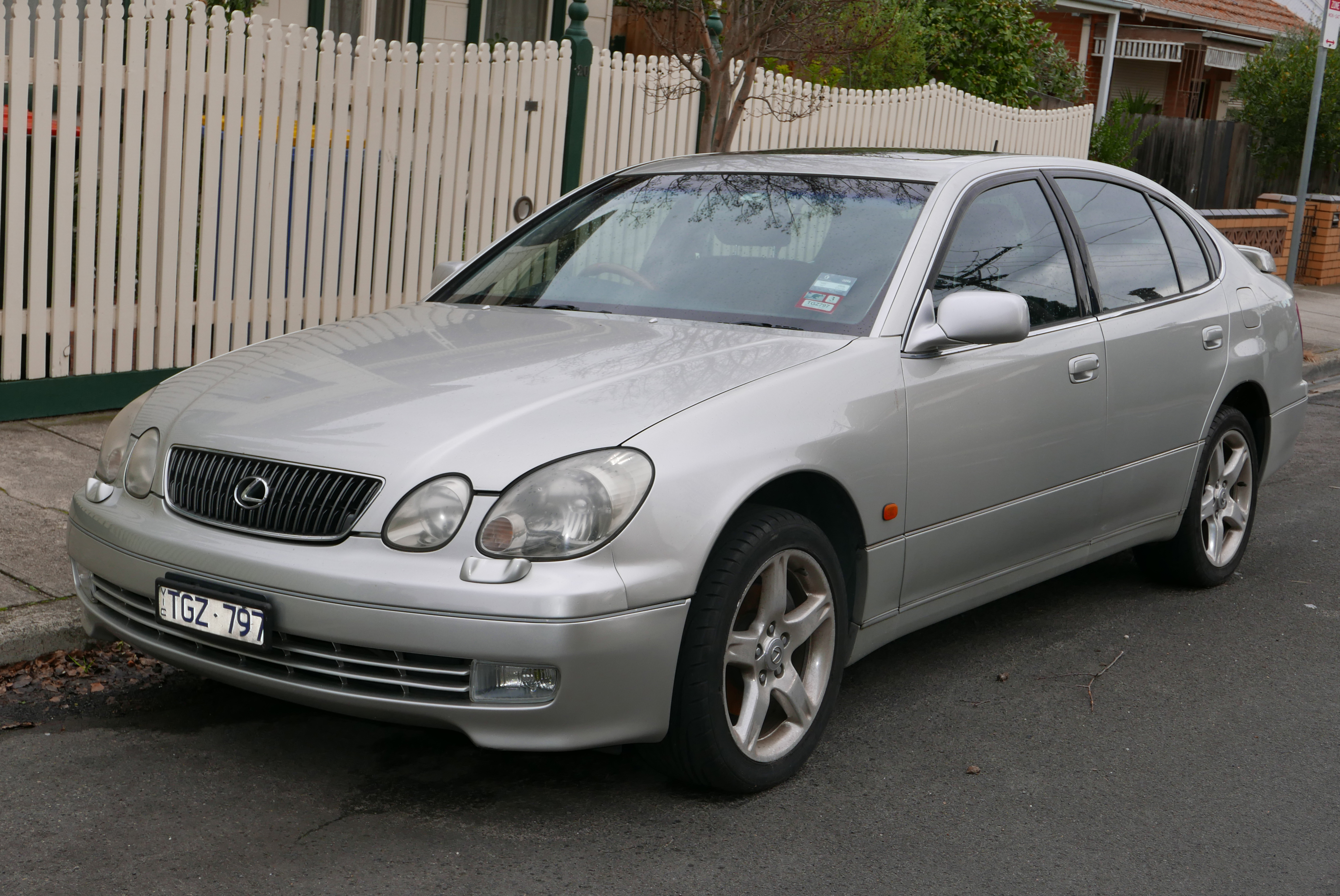
2000–2004 Lexus GS 300 (JZS160R, Australia)

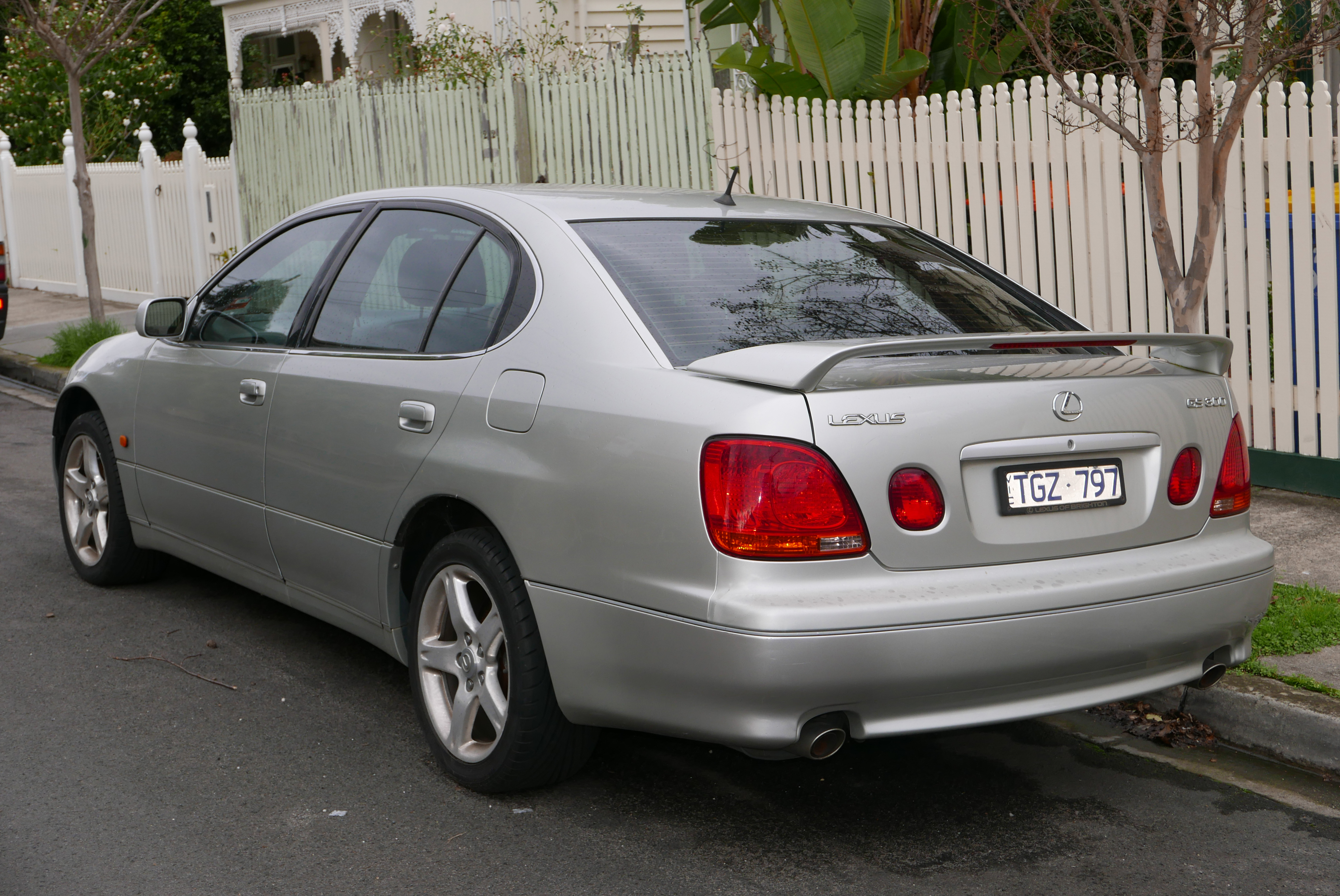
2000–2004 Lexus GS 300 (JZS160R, Australia)

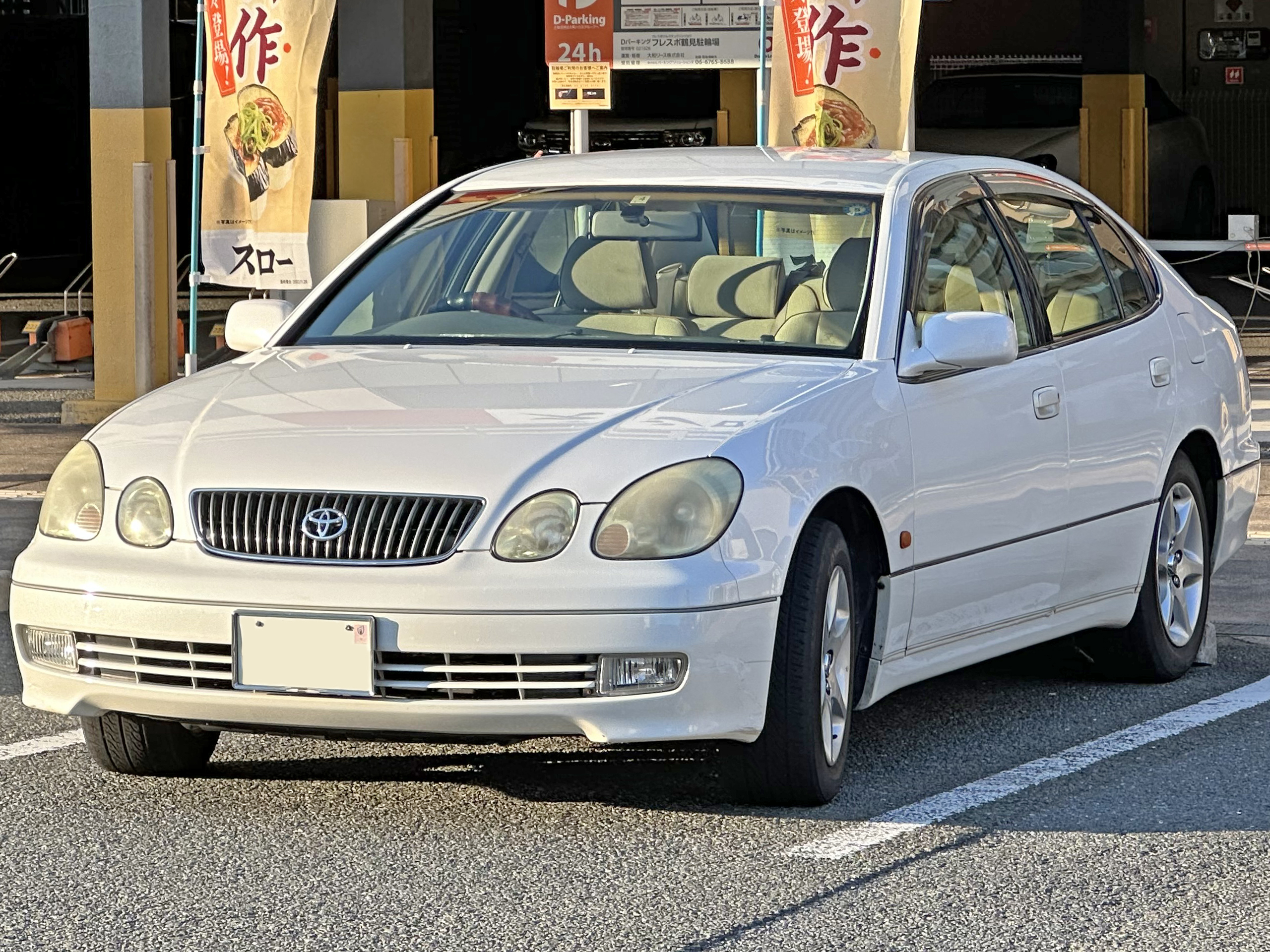
Toyota Aristo S300 (JZS160, Japan)

=== SportDesign package ===
For the 2002 model year, Lexus offered a limited production GS 300 "SportDesign" package for North America; this performance/trim package offered the GS 300 the same firmly-tuned suspension and "L-tuned" steering ECU module that were both standard equipment on the GS 430, along with a rear lip spoiler and polished alloy wheels. Other features include special badging, titanium-like HID headlamps, and a chrome grille. The SportDesign package interior-wise added perforated leather upholstery, uniquely branded door sills along with brushed aluminum and dark stained walnut trim. A version of the SportDesign that included Navigation with a Mark Levinson sound system was also offered. The SportDesign trim package was offered from the 2002 through 2003 model years.

== Third generation (S190; 2005) ==
Third generation
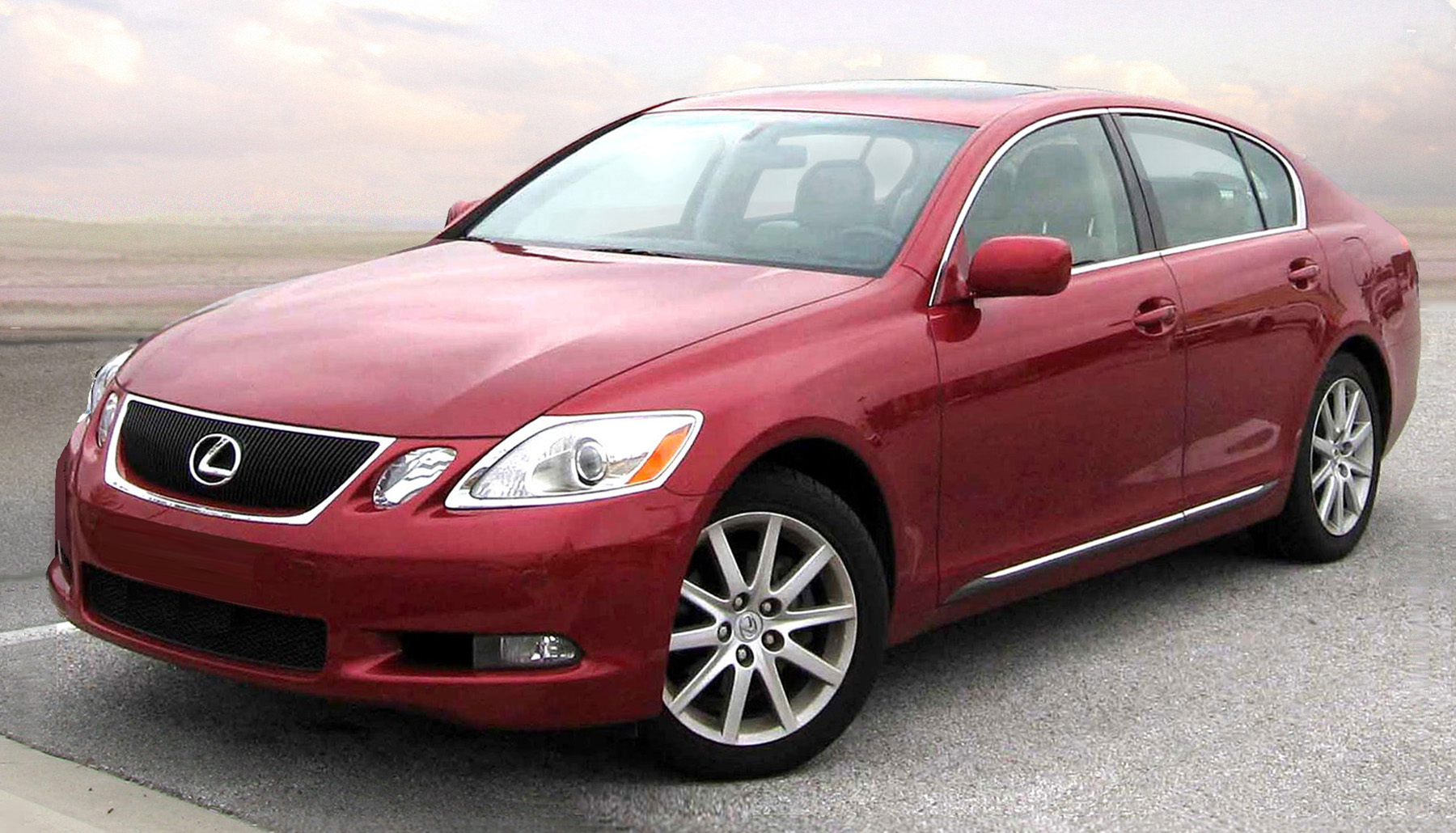
- Pre-facelift Lexus GS 350 (GRS191, US)

Overview
- Model code: S190
- Production: January 2005 – December 2011
- Model years: 2006–2011
- Assembly: Japan: Tahara, Aichi (Tahara plant)
- Designer: Yasuhide Hosoda, Isoroku Yamada and Sotiris Kovos (2002)

Body and chassis
- Layout: Front-engine, rear-wheel-drive; Front-engine, all-wheel-drive
- Platform: Toyota N platform
- Related: Toyota Crown (S180)

Powertrain
- Engine: 3.0 L 3GR-FE V6 (Middle East); 3.0 L 3GR-FSE V6; 3.5 L 2GR-FSE V6; 3.5 L 2GR-FXE V6 (hybrid); 4.3 L 3UZ-FE V8; 4.6 L 1UR-FE V8 (Middle East); 4.6 L 1UR-FSE V8
- Transmission: 6-speed A760E/60H/61E automatic; 8-speed AA80E automatic; CVT automatic (hybrid)

Dimensions
- Wheelbase: 2,850 mm (112.2 in)
- Length: 4,826–4,844 mm (190.0–190.7 in)
- Width: 1,821 mm (71.7 in)
- Height: 1,425–1,435 mm (56.1–56.5 in)

=== 2005–2007 ===
In 1999, development commenced on a successor to the S160 under chief engineer, Shigetoshi Miyoshi. Styling for both the exterior and interior was done under lead designer Yasuhide Hosoda between 2000 and 2002, during which L-finesse came to fruition in 2001. By 2002, a design was finalized, to be introduced the following year. In October 2003, Lexus debuted the LF-S (Lexus Future Sedan), a concept car which previewed the design of the upcoming GS. The design patent was filed by Toyota on 22 December 2003 in domestic Japanese patent offices, preceding an imminent public unveiling. The third generation GS first appeared as a pre-production vehicle at the 2004 North American International Auto Show on 5 January, riding on a then new architecture N platform, with the production version being shown at the same show in January 2005.

Production of the third generation began on 24 January 2005, without release of an equivalent Toyota Aristo, as Toyota had introduced the Lexus channel to Japan and sought to align all world markets using Lexus as their luxury brand worldwide. The third generation GS was the introductory Lexus model for the marque's new L-finesse design philosophy, indicating the future direction of the Lexus lineup; it featured a fastback profile, retained quad headlights, LED tailamps, and one-piece bumpers. This generation GS had a drag coefficient of Cd=0.27, and used a newly designed midsize platform later shared with the second generation IS.

In September 2005, the GS 350 (GRS191) and GS 430 (UZS190) went on sale in Japan; the GS 350 using a 3.5-liter 2GR-FSE engine with D4-S direct injection, while the GS 430 used the same 4.3-liter 3UZ-FE V8 engine used in the previous model. Sales in the US began in March 2005, with the initial lineup including the GS 300 (GRS190), featuring a ULEV certified 3.0-liter 3GR-FSE V6 engine, and the GS 430 featuring the 4.3-liter V8. All GS models at launch featured a new six-speed automatic sequential shift gearbox. An all-wheel drive system was made available in the GS 300.

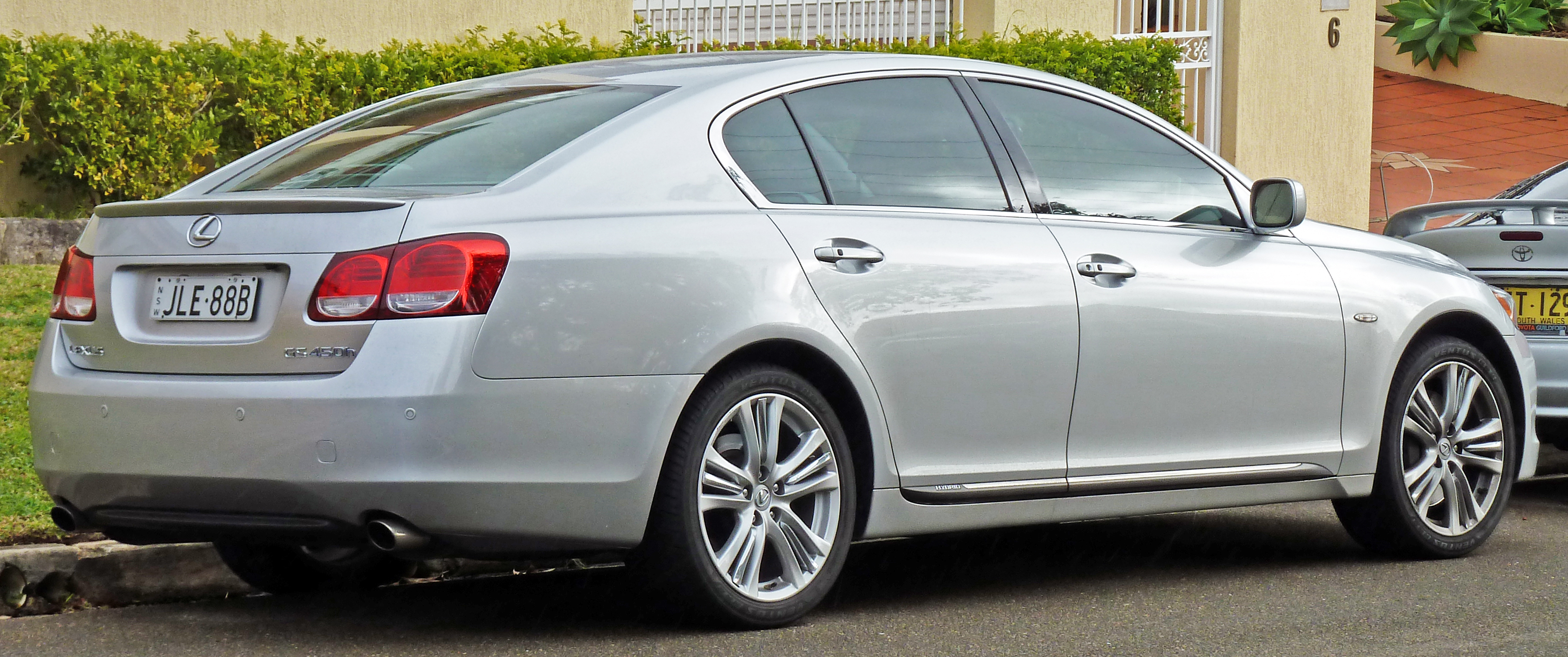
2006–2009 Lexus GS 450h (GWS191; Australia)

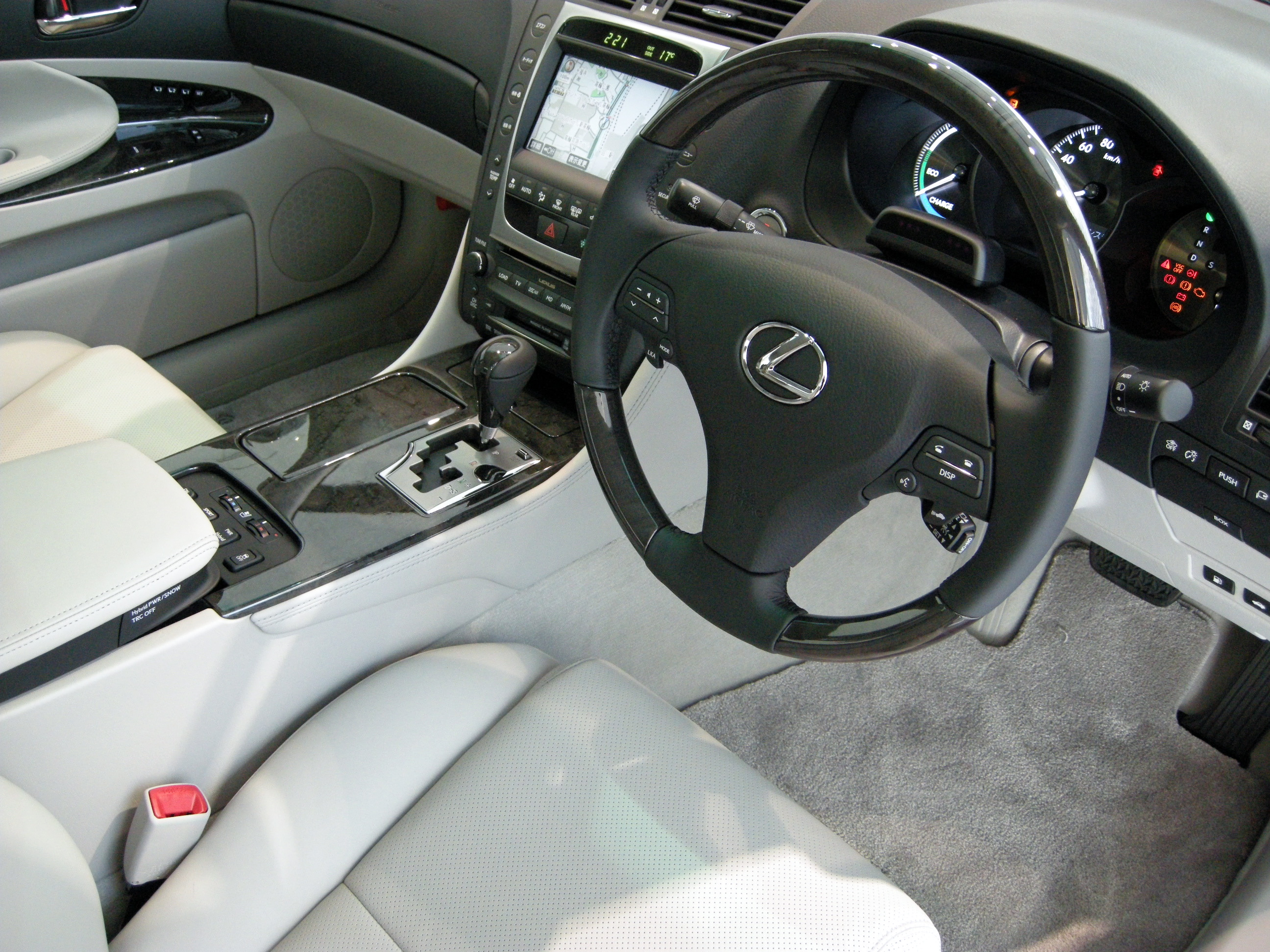
Third generation GS interior (GWS191), with hybrid kilowatt meter instead of tachometer and G-Book navigation.

Unveiled at the 2005 New York International Auto Show, the hybrid GS 450h (GWS191) joined the GS line in 2006 for the 2007 model year. GS Hybrid production started in February 2006. It was the first mass-production rear-wheel drive luxury hybrid car, featuring the naturally aspirated 3.5-liter 2GR-FSE V6 engine mated to two electric motors and a planetary type continuously variable transmission (CVT). This powertrain made use of the Lexus Hybrid Drive system of integrating electric and gasoline engine motors, giving the GS 450h a Super Ultra Low Emissions Vehicle (SULEV) emissions rating, and total output of 253 kW (339 hp), allowing the GS to accelerate 0–60 mph (0–97 km/h) in 5.2 seconds, according to manufacturer data.

New to the GS line was an electric power steering (EPS) system, and both the V8 and hybrid models featured a variable gear ratio steering (VGRS) system and Electronically Controlled Brake (ECB) a type of brake-by-wire system. V8 and hybrid models also featured an adaptive suspension system that individually altered suspension damper firmness. Vehicle Dynamics Integrated Management (VDIM) was standard on the GS 430, 460, and 450h models and coupled to VGRS, with which it could alter steering gear ratios.

Standard safety features on the GS ranged from multiple airbags, including knee airbags and front row side torso airbags, to adaptive headlights, anti-lock braking, electronic brakeforce distribution, brake assist and electronic stability control. The radar-based pre-collision system with an autonomous cruise control system was optional. The GS 450h was among the first vehicles to receive the infrared Driver Monitoring System for driver attentiveness. For the 2007 model year, the GS 350 replaced the GS 300 in the US and several other export markets.

The GS interior was available with leather bird's-eye maple or walnut trim. Major standard features ranged from a 10-way driver and front passenger power and heated seats with three-position Lexus Memory System, SmartAccess keyless system with push-button start, a driver-side hidden drop-down panel for infrequently used controls, standard 7 in (180 mm) touchscreen display, and LED lighting in the cabin. Unique to the Lexus GS series was a three-pod instrument cluster with machined aluminum facings and an electrochromic feature. Optional features ranged from a power moonroof to a discrete 5.1 surround sound 14-speaker 330-watt Mark Levinson premium sound system, XM-satellite radio and DVD-based navigation with backup camera and Bluetooth technology. Competitors to the Lexus GS included the BMW 5 Series, Mercedes-Benz E-Class, Volvo S80, Audi A6, Jaguar XF, Infiniti M, and Acura RL.

=== 2007–2011 ===
The GS 460 (URS191) replaced the GS 430 in 2007 for the 2008 model year, featuring a new 4.6-liter 1UR-FE (Middle East) or a 1UR-FSE V8 engine with eight-speed automatic transmission generating 255 kW (342 hp) and 460 N⋅m (339 ft⋅lb) of torque. Lexus reported a 0–60 mph (0–97 km/h) time of 5.4 seconds. Along with the hybrid GS 450h and previous GS 430 models, the V8-powered GS 460 offered the Active Stabilizer Suspension System for improved handling. The GS 450h retains its position as the most expensive in the GS lineup, and has faster acceleration than the GS 460, though the GS 460 is lighter and has a higher top speed. In 2010, the GS was outsold nearly two to one by the flagship LS.

Along with the introduction of the GS 460, the GS lineup received a mid-cycle styling refresh, including a revised front bumper, headlights and grille, turn signals added to the side mirrors, and new wheel options and exterior colors. The interior received a redesigned steering wheel, revised instrument cluster gauges, and different trim pieces.

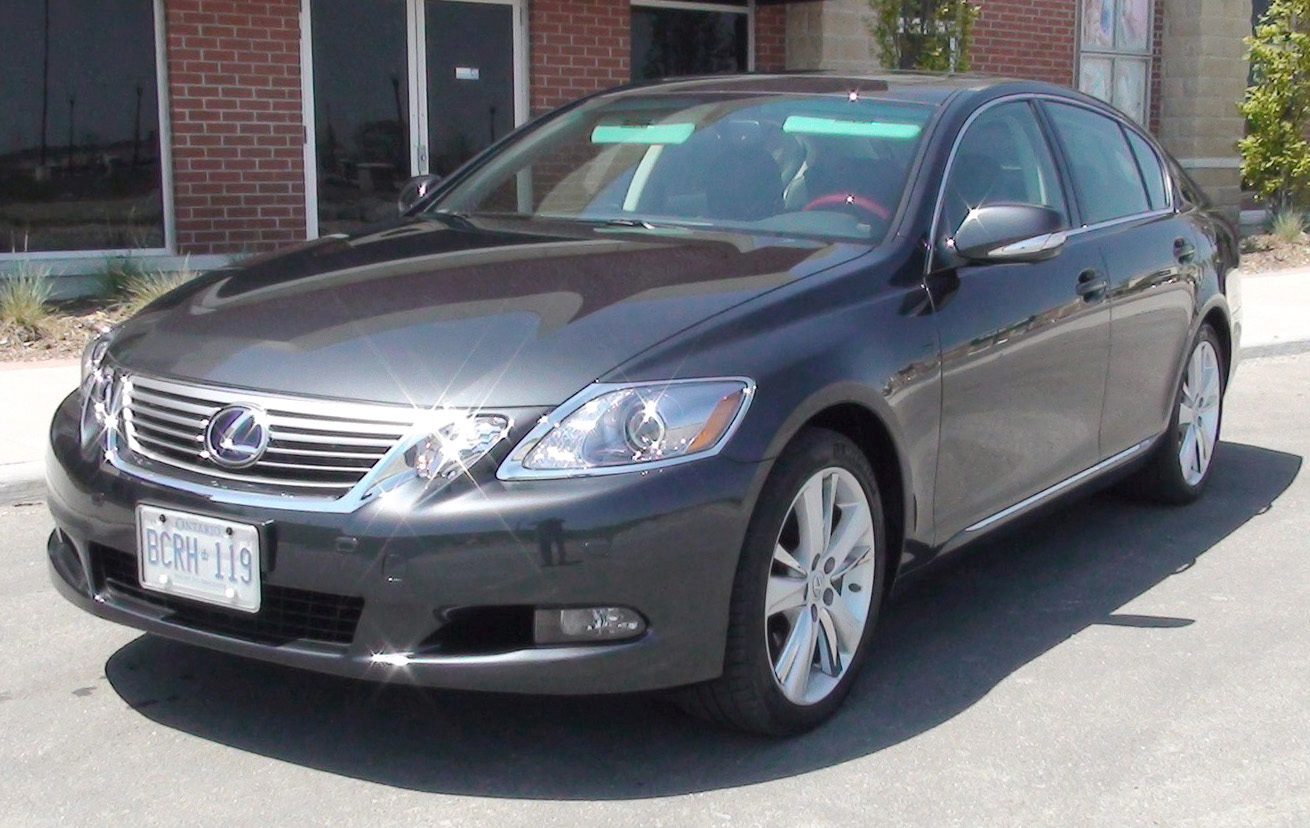
2010 model year Lexus GS 450h (GWS191, Canada)

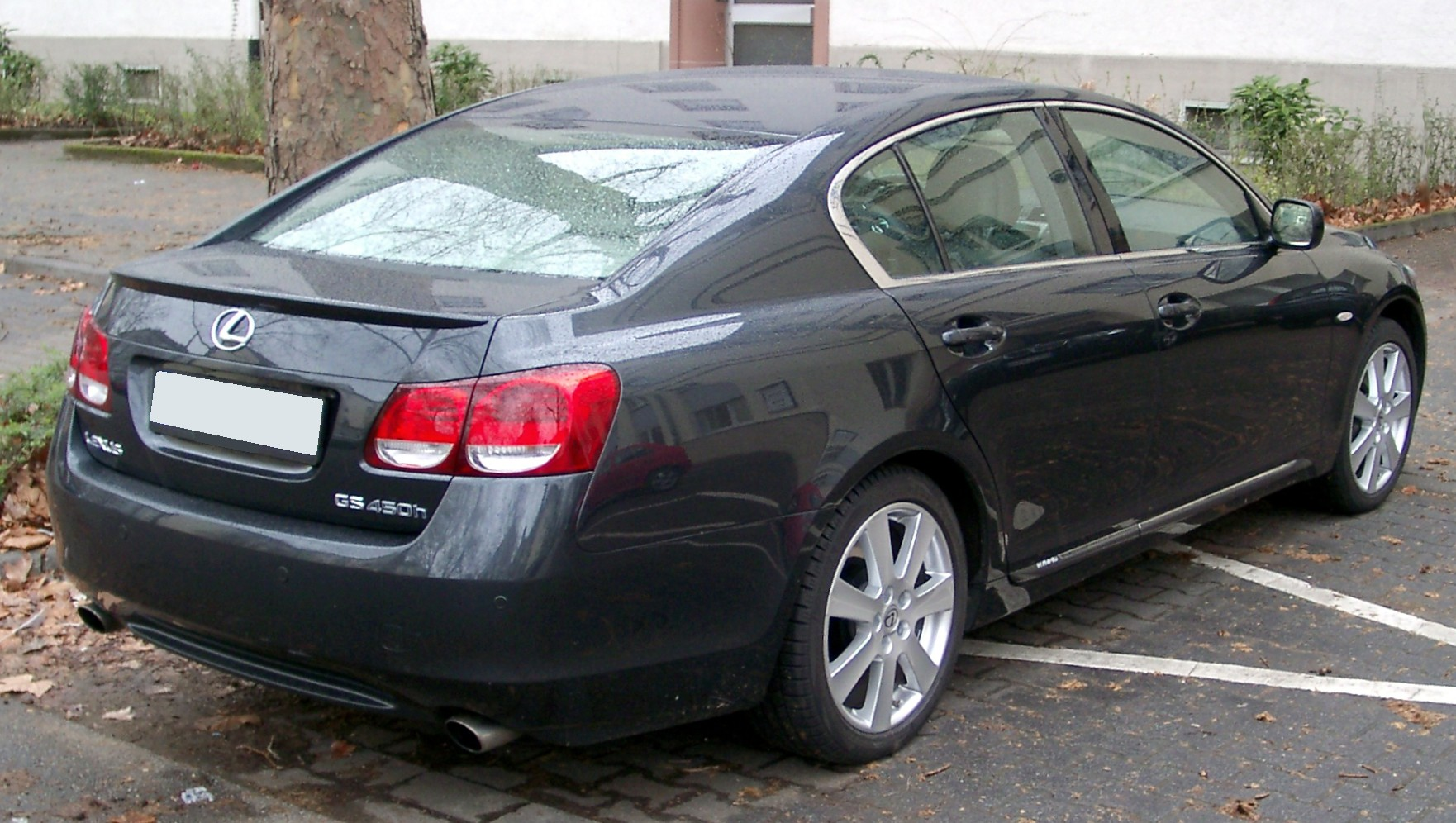
Lexus GS 450h (GWS191, Germany)

== Fourth generation (L10; 2011) ==
Fourth generation
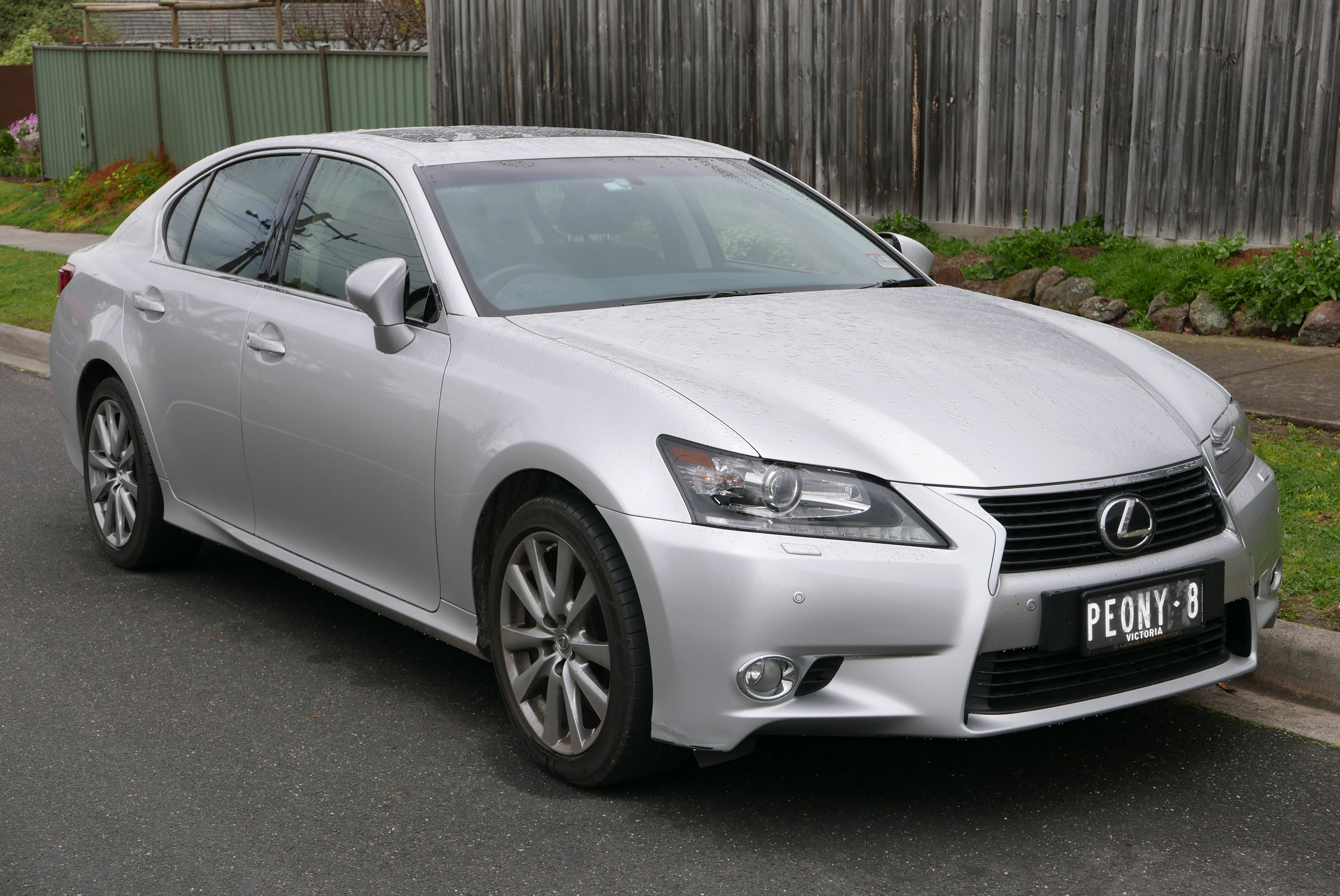
- 2012 Lexus GS 250 (GRL11, Australia)

Overview
- Model code: L10
- Production: December 2011 – August 2020
- Model years: 2012–2020
- Assembly: Japan: Tahara, Aichi (Tahara plant); Japan: Toyota, Aichi (Motomachi plant)
- Designer: Katsuhiko Inatomi (2009)

Body and chassis
- Layout: Front-engine, rear-wheel-drive; Front-engine, all-wheel-drive
- Platform: Toyota New N platform

Powertrain
- Engine: 2.0 L 8AR-FTS I4 (turbo); 2.5 L 2AR-FSE I4 (hybrid); 2.5 L 4GR-FSE V6; 3.5 L 2GR-FSE V6; 3.5 L 2GR-FKS V6; 3.5 L 2GR-FXE V6 (hybrid); 5.0 L 2UR-GSE V8 (GS F)
- Electric motor: 105 kW (141 hp; 143 PS) 1 km synchronous (GS 300h); 147 kW (197 hp; 200 PS) 1 km synchronous (GS 450h)
- Power output: 131 kW (176 hp; 178 PS) (GS 300h, gasoline engine only); 162 kW (217 hp; 220 PS) (GS 300h, combined system output); 217 kW (291 hp; 295 PS) (GS 450h, gasoline engine only); 256 kW (343 hp; 348 PS) (GS 450h, combined system output); 351 kW (471 hp; 477 PS) (GS F)
- Transmission: 6-speed automatic; CVT automatic (hybrid); 8-speed AA80E automatic (GS F); 8-speed AA81E automatic (2013–2020)

Dimensions
- Wheelbase: 2,850 mm (112.2 in)
- Length: 4,850 mm (190.9 in) (2013–2015); 4,890 mm (192.5 in) (2016–2020)
- Width: 1,840 mm (72.4 in)
- Height: 1,455 mm (57.3 in)
- Curb weight: 1,721–1,805 kg (3,795–3,980 lb); 1,865 kg (4,112 lb) (hybrid)

=== 2011–2015 ===
In early 2007, development began on the L10 series GS under Yoshihiko Kanamori, with the design process finalizing under new president and CEO Akio Toyoda's direction in 2009. Design patents were filed in Japan on 6 October 2010 for the production model and a conceptual variant on 29 March 2011. In April 2011, Lexus showed the LF-Gh concept (Lexus Future Grand-Touring Hybrid) at that year's New York International Auto Show, previewing the stylistic direction of future Lexus models. The LF-Gh featured a large, spindle-shaped front grille, and press information further indicated that it had a new interior design which included an analog clock. The LF-Gh concept vehicle was taken by automotive journalists as an indication of what the fourth generation Lexus GS would look like.

The fourth generation GS had its world premiere at the Pebble Beach Concours d'Elegance in California in August 2011. The vehicle was shown to have a more subtle version of the LF-Gh's spindle grille, while overall exterior dimensions are almost identical to the previous generation. L-shaped LED front daytime running lamps and rear LED tube lamps are a new design feature. The fourth generation GS was the centerpiece of Toyota chairman Akio Toyoda's initiative to restore passion to the Lexus brand and better compete with German luxury automakers that had been gaining market share in the United States. It was reported that Toyoda initially opposed the styling choices made for the new model, but later thanked the design team that persuaded him to greenlight the project. Unlike the first three generations, the fourth generation GS is not based on any Crown models as it is built on a separate New N platform.

At its debut, the fourth generation model was shown in rear-wheel drive GS 350 (GRL10) form, powered by a V6 engine linked with a six-speed automatic transmission. Three driving modes are featured, ranging from fuel-conserving Eco to Sport S and Sport S+ which facilitate more sporty transmission shifting and engine throttle settings, as well as suspension damper and steering adjustments. The chassis has been redesigned, and overall curb weight is reduced. To reduce unsprung mass the new GS utilizes aluminum for all its suspension components. The GS 350 F Sport adds a rear-wheel steering system for improved handling on rear wheel drive models. New larger 14-inch brakes come standard as well as 19-inch F Sport wheels, a new front bumper, rear spoiler, F Sport steering wheel, F Sport seats and a new suspension system with AVS adjustable dampers.

The redesigned interior gains the Lexus Remote Touch mouse controller system in place of the previous touchscreen, linked to a split-view 12.3 in (310 mm) widescreen dashboard display.

It also features a new technology, Save energy + airflow control (S-FLOW), which is the world's first system that sends air only to where vehicle occupants are seated in order to maintain and improve comfort while also improving fuel efficiency.

Other interior features include Mark Levinson surround sound system. Front 18-way power seats are available; 10-way power seats are equipped standard. Optional features further include a pre-collision system, Heads-Up Display, blind spot monitor, lane keep assist, and Driver Monitoring System.

Variants such as the GS 350 and GS 250, as well as their F Sport variants, began sales in Japan on 26 January 2012, followed by the GS 450h and the GS 450h F Sport on 19 March 2012. Sales for the fourth generation in the US began in February 2012 for models including the GS 350 and GS 350 F Sport, with the hybrid version following several months after. A smaller-displacement model, the GS 250 (GRL11), was shown at the 2011 Auto Guangzhou, targeted for sales in China, Japan, Australia and the UK, but not the US.

The GS 450h (GWL10), rated at 256 kW (343 hp) and now using an Atkinson cycle design, has a 35 percent improvement in fuel economy over the previous generation GS 450h, and has a higher combined EPA fuel efficiency rating (31 mpg) than the 306 horsepower GS 350 (23 mpg). Trunk space is improved both for the hybrid and standard models. The GS 450h features standard full LED headlamps and a bamboo trimmed interior. The vehicle was unveiled at the 2011 Frankfurt Motor Show.

For the 2014 model year, changes to GS 350 includes an eight-speed automatic transmission for rear-wheel drive (RWD) models, introduction of F SPORT package (optional Lexus Dynamic Handling system with dynamic rear steering (DRS), electric power steering, variable gear ratio steering (VGRS)), integrated Siri Eyes Free mode from Apple (compatible with iPhone 4S and newer), flush mounted sensors for available intuitive park assist, full color display added to the optional head-up display, available blind spot monitor adds rear cross traffic alert and power-folding mirrors, Luxury Package changes (LED foglamps, Superchrome finish for 18-inch wheels, and the rear armrest control panel display adds display option to view radio station and song title information), optional power trunk opener, Lexus Night View system discontinued.

The GS 300h hybrid model includes a 2.5-liter Atkinson cycle inline-four engine with a D-4S direct injection technology, derived from the third generation IS. The vehicle was unveiled at the 2013 Shanghai Motor Show. The vehicle went on sale in China, Europe, Asia, Australia, and New Zealand, but not in the US.

It is a version of Lexus GS 300h for European market, with 2.5-liter Atkinson cycle four-cylinder engine (181PS), two electric motors, a hard-drive navigation system with a 12.3-inch Monitor and Lexus Connected Services, Mark Levinson audio system, DVD player and rear-view camera with a monitor, among other features. The vehicle went on sale on 11 January 2014.

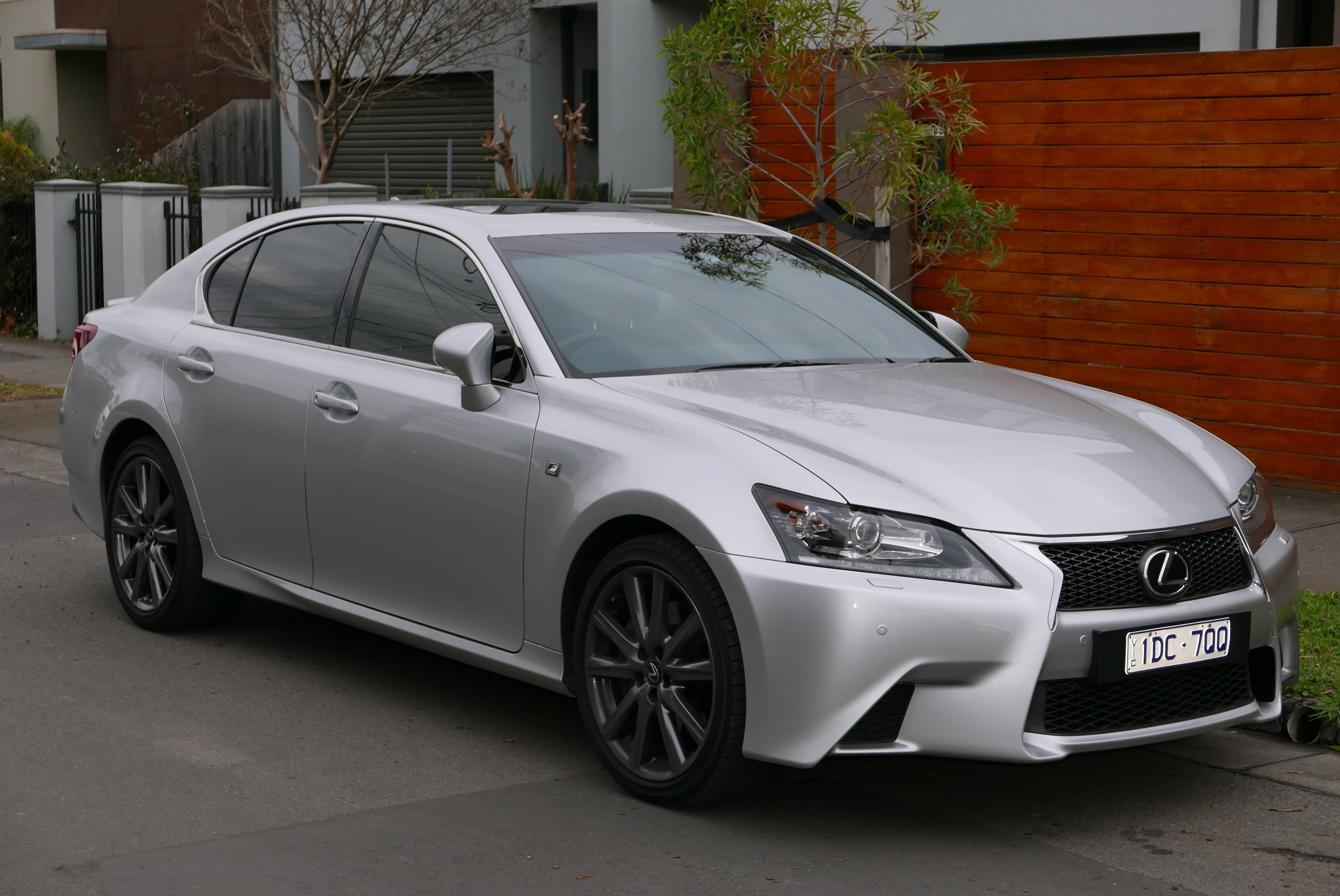
Pre-facelift Lexus GS 250 F Sport (GRL11, Australia)

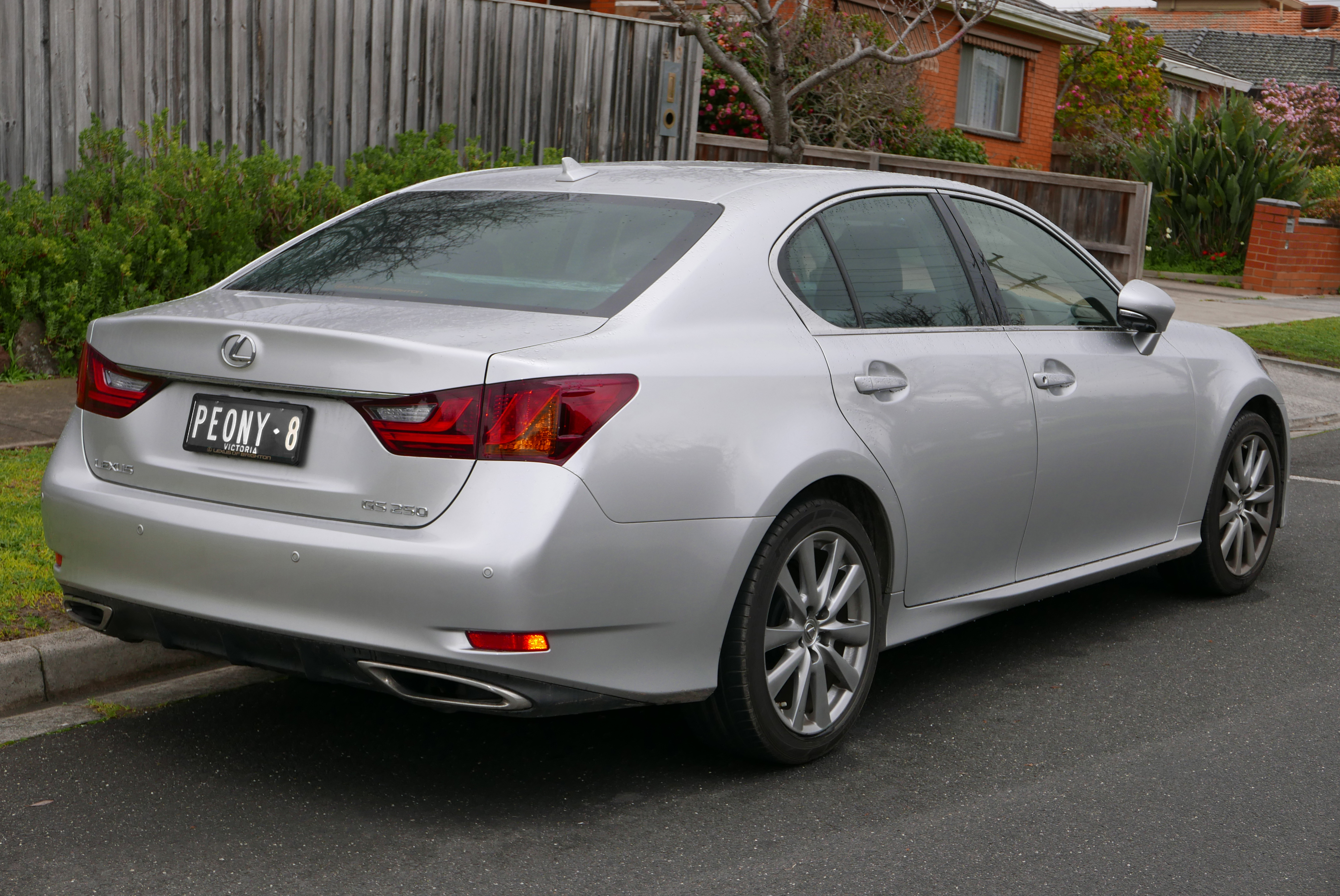
Pre-facelift Lexus GS 250 Luxury (GRL11, Australia)

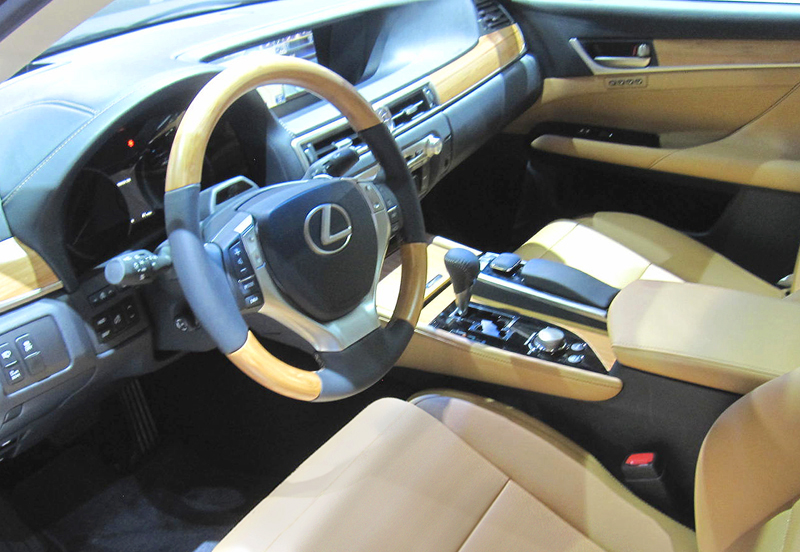
Lexus GS 450h interior with bamboo accents (US)

=== 2015–2020 ===
The revised GS debuted at Monterey Car Week in August 2015. Changes include a GS 200t variant equipped with the 2.0-liter 8AR-FTS turbocharged engine to replace the GS 250, and an update to the 3.5-liter V6, now upgraded to 2GR-FKS specification. that uses the Atkinson cycle and features founded on the previous 2GR-FSE motor. Additional changes include revised exterior elements (including front and rear trim, exterior lighting, wheels, and rocker panels), new active safety features, and a revised infotainment system. The GS 200t was renamed to GS 300 for the 2018 North American model year.

In 2018, Lexus discontinued the GS for European markets and replaced it with the front-wheel drive ES already sold in North America and some Asian countries. Lexus issued a press release saying that production of the GS will end as of August 2020.

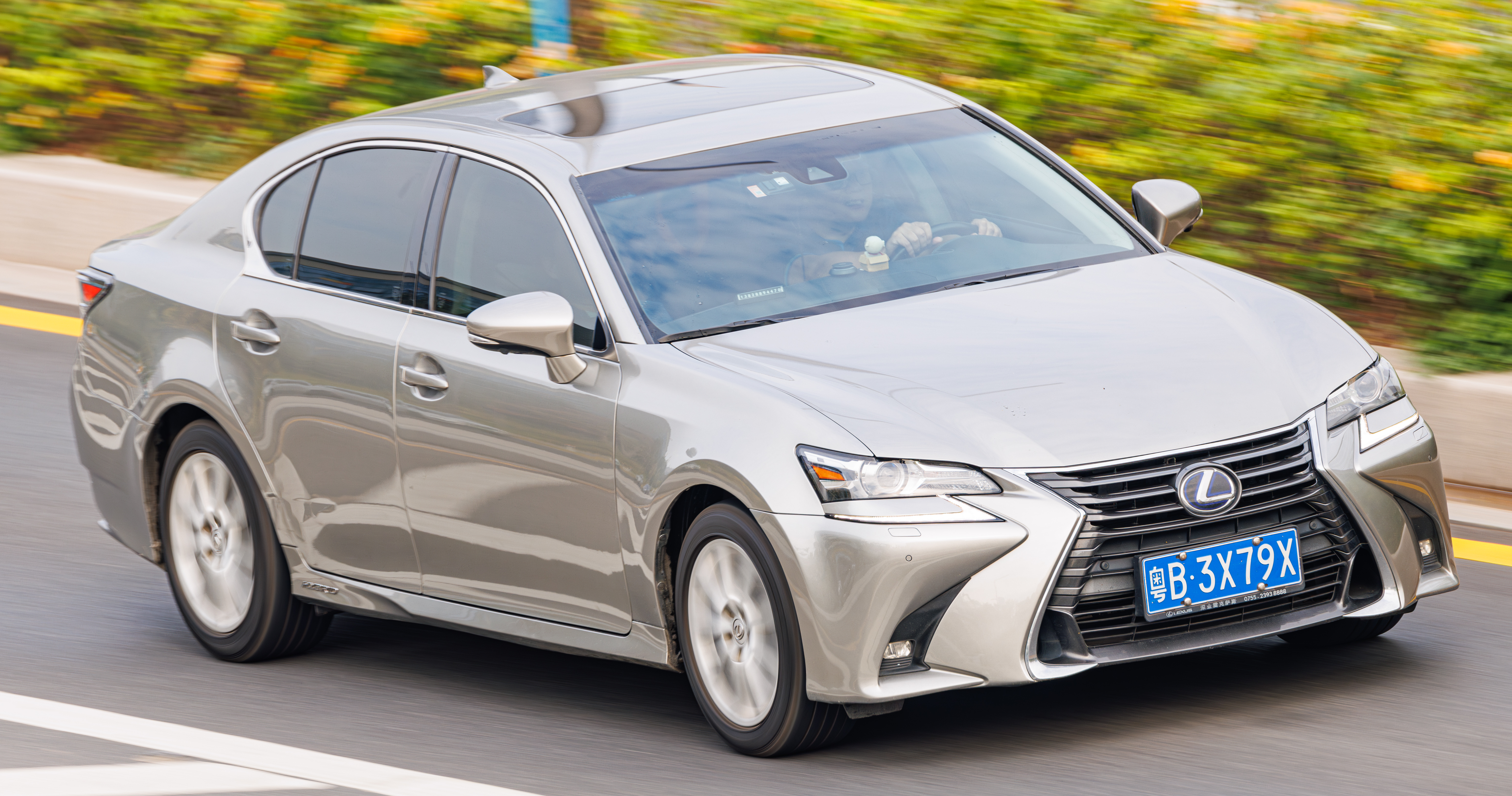
Lexus GS 300h (AWL10, China)

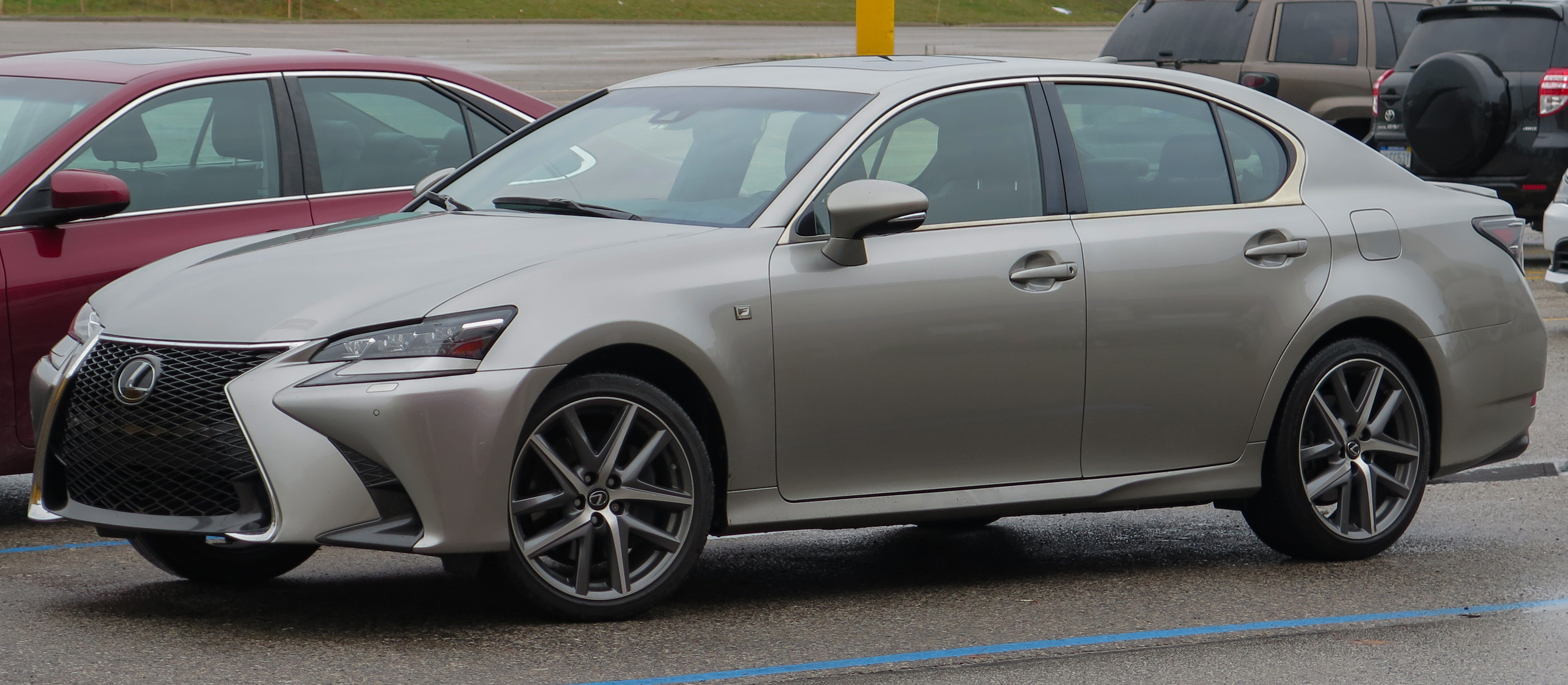
Lexus GS 350 F Sport AWD (GRL16, US)

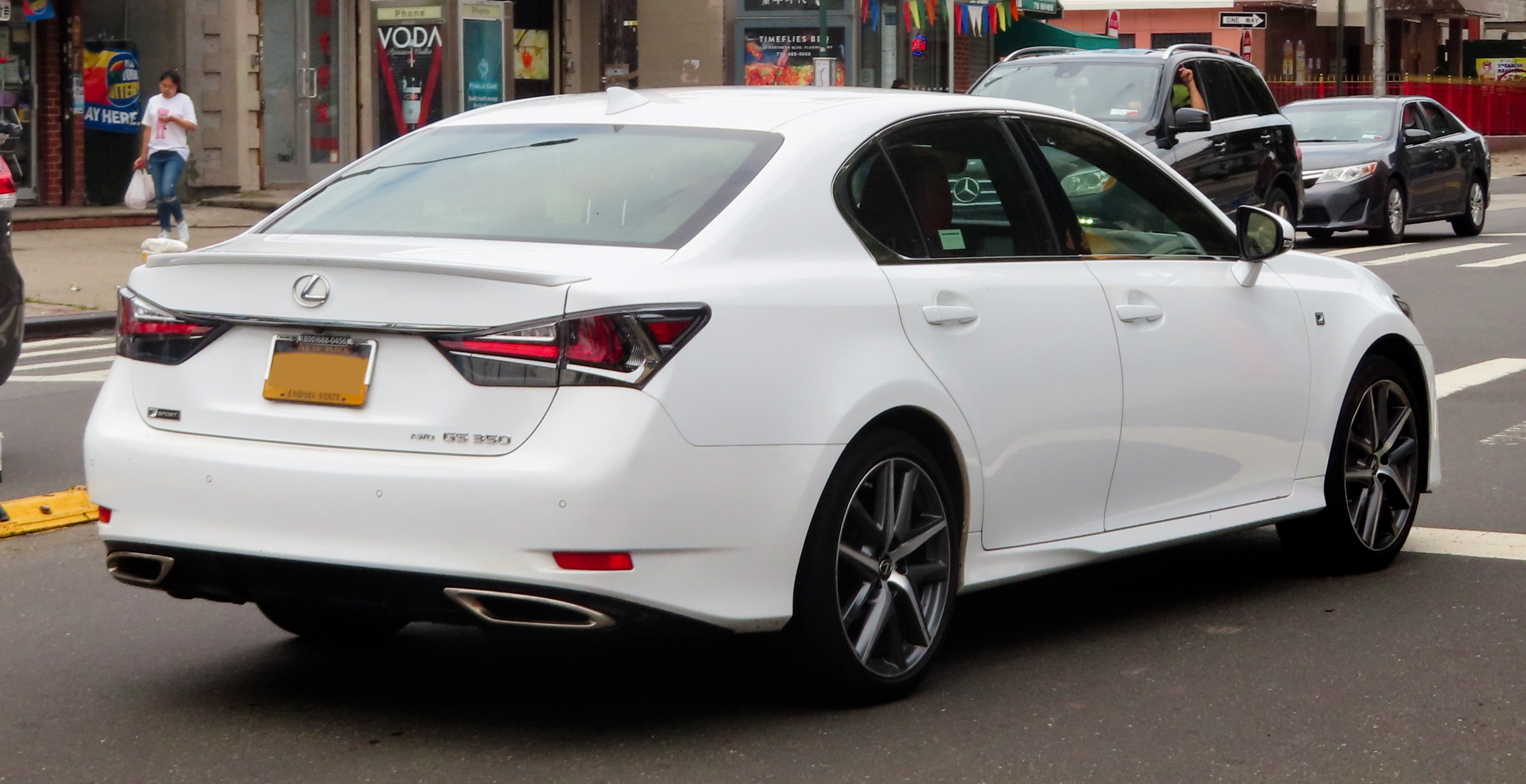
Rear view of Lexus GS 350 F Sport AWD (GRL16, US)

==== GS F ====
The high performance "F" version of the GS, the GS F, was unveiled at the 2015 North American International Auto Show. It went on sale in the United States in November 2015 for the 2016 model year.

The GS F features a 5.0 L 2UR-GSE V8 engine with Atkinson cycle at cruising speeds, delivering a maximum output of 348 kW (473 PS; 467 hp) at 7100 rpm and 527 N⋅m (389 lb⋅ft) of torque at 4800–5600 rpm. It is paired with a Toyota AA80E 8-speed transmission built by Aisin. The GS F is equipped with Brembo four-wheel power assisted disc brakes with anti-lock braking system (ABS), electronic brake force distribution (EBD) and brake assist (BA), vertical G-sensor for VDIM, rear Torsen or Torque Vectoring Differential (TVD) with three operating modes (Standard, Slalom, or Track), monotube gas-filled shock absorbers and ball-jointed stabilizer bars, spindle grille with F-mesh pattern on the lower half, raised front hood, front cooling ducts, front fender ducts in the L shape, exclusive combination meters from LFA (a large centrally mounted tachometer that alters according to drive mode, digital and analog speedometer, differential torque vectoring monitor, G-force meter, oil and water temperature gauges, mileage information and a stopwatch), and an elliptical cross-section thick grip steering wheel.

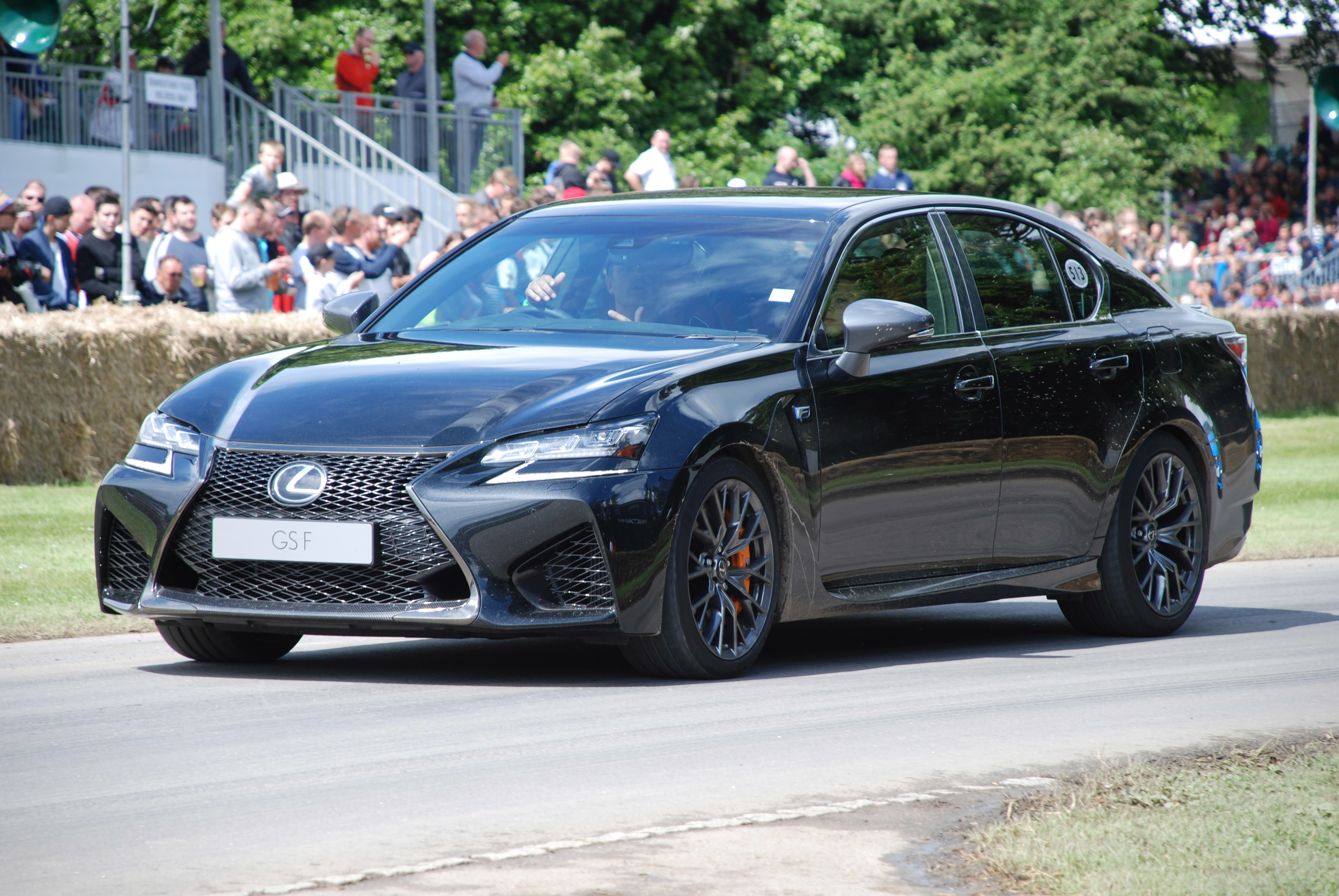
Lexus GS F (URL10, UK)

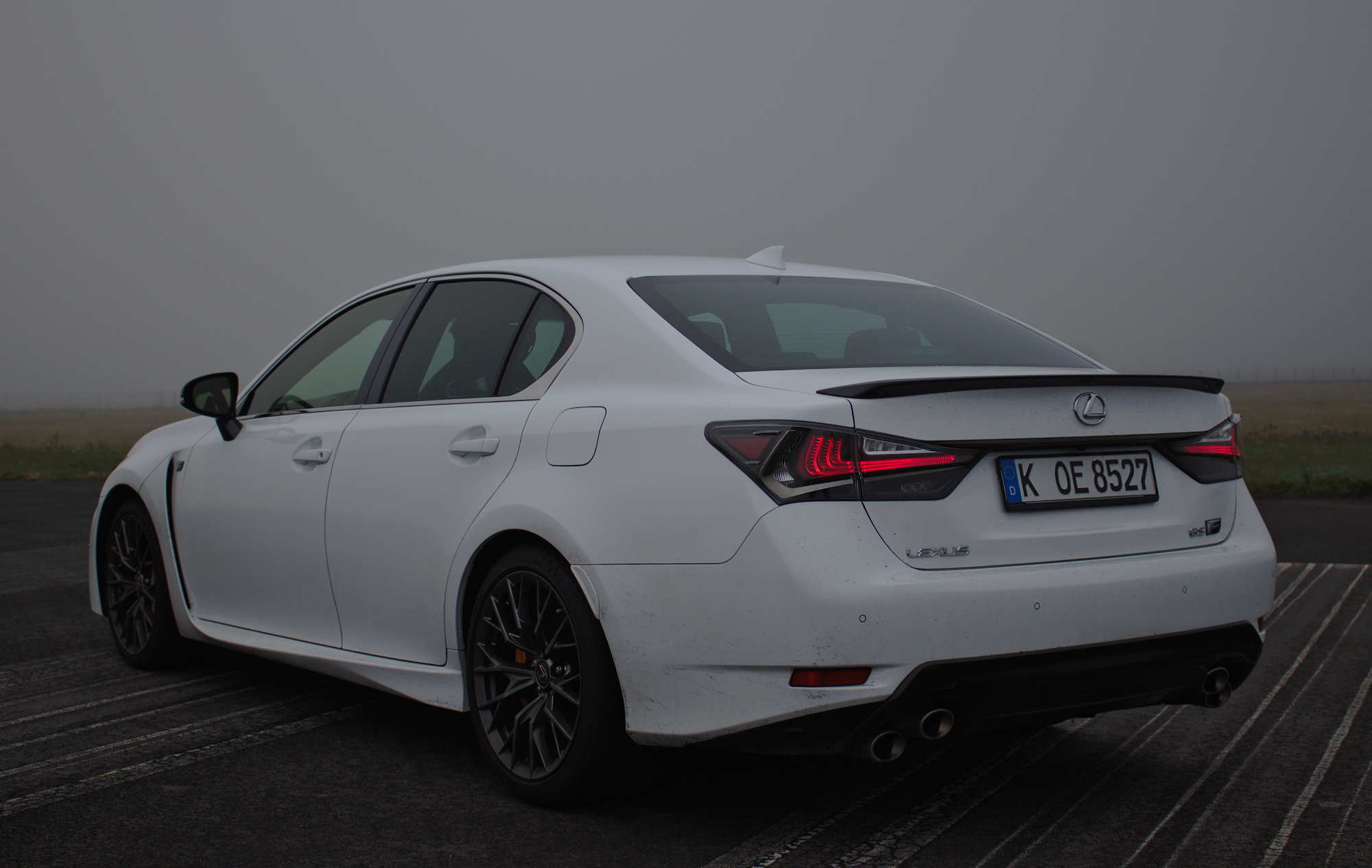
Lexus GS F (URL10, Germany)

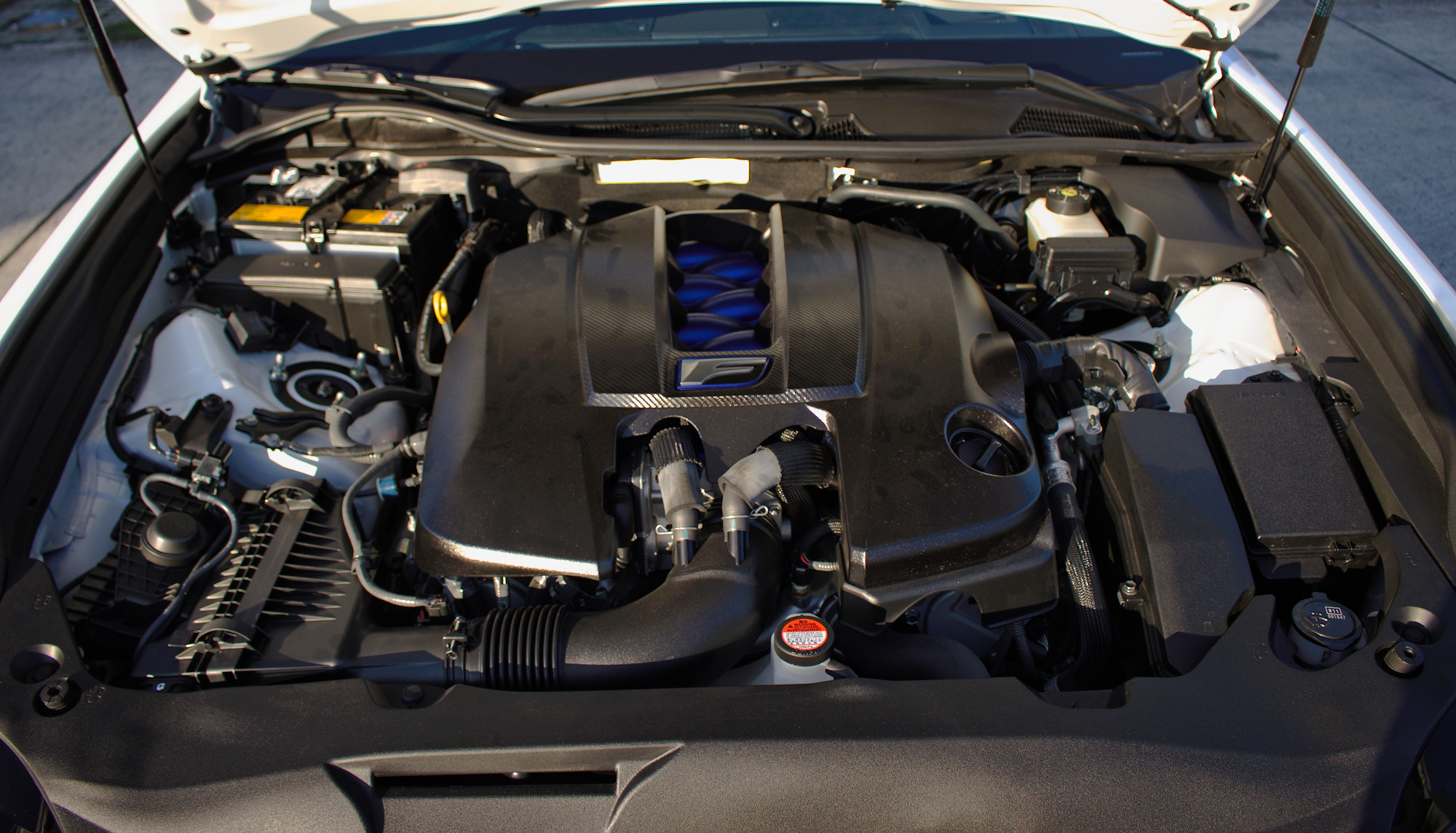
Lexus GS F 2UR-GSE V8 engine

== Motorsport ==
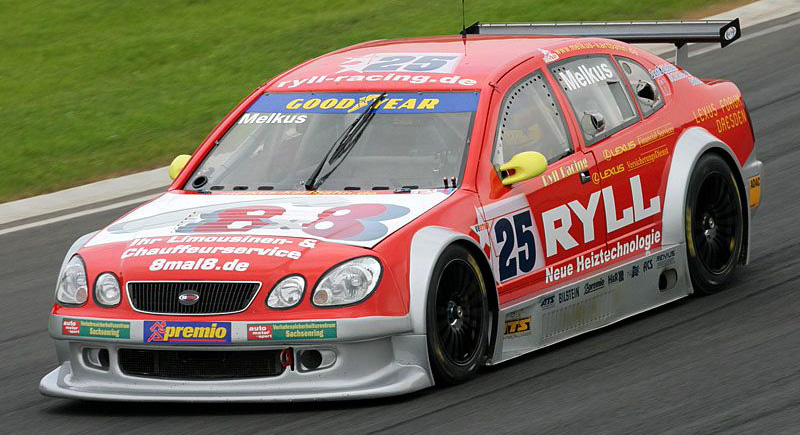
GS 400 V8Star Series touring race car

The Lexus GS was used in Motorola Cup North American Street Stock Championship touring car series competition in 1998, beginning with two GS 400 race vehicles driven by Team Lexus in its inaugural season. For 1999, Team Lexus achieved its first victory with the GS 400 in its sixth race at Road Atlanta. The GS 400 was raced until 2001, when Team Lexus switched to the IS 300. In the mid-2000s, the GS 400 was entered in the V8Star Series touring car racing season, with Ronny Melkus competing in the V8 GS in 2003.

In 2006, Sigma Advanced Racing Development and Lexus entered a GS 450h performance hybrid sedan in the 24 Hours of Tokachi race in Hokkaido, Japan, the first time that a hybrid vehicle was introduced. In 2007, Lexus Canada also entered the GS 450h in the Targa Newfoundland event. In 2009, the GS 450h was used as a safety car at the Muscle Car Masters event held at Eastern Creek Raceway, Eastern Creek, New South Wales, Australia.

In 2008, Manabu "Max" Orido used a second generation JZS161 Aristo in Formula D competition. Orido has several second generation models with different equipment used for drifting events, some with prototype suspension, and fitted with parts from the export Lexus GS 300.

== Sales and production ==
Sales data for Lexus GS generations are as follows. Sourced from manufacturer yearly data.

Generation (chassis code)	Model no(s).	Calendar year	Sales U.S.	Sales Japan	Total exports, production^{‡}
JZS147	GS 300	1993	19,164		18,450
JZS147	GS 300	1994	13,939		12,905
JZS147	GS 300	1995	6,263		7,797
JZS147	GS 300	1996	2,044		2,500
JZS147	GS 300	1997	7,718		175
JZS160/UZS160	GS 300/400	1998	30,622		26,705
JZS160/UZS160	GS 300/400	1999	30,326		30,326
JZS160/UZS160	GS 300/400	2000	26,705		26,705
JZS160/UZS161	GS 300/430	2001	24,461		29,715
JZS160/UZS161	GS 300/430	2002	17,246		17,710
JZS160/UZS161	GS 300/430	2003	13,306		14,479
JZS160/UZS161	GS 300/430	2004	8,262		9,681
JZS160/UZS161	GS 300/430	2005	33,457	5,843	3,000
GRS190/GRS195/UZS190	GS 300/350/430	2006	27,390	9,145	51,290^{‡}
GRS191/GRS196/UZS190/GWS191	GS 350/430/450h	2007	23,381	5,089	45,588^{‡}
GRS191/GRS196/URS191/GWS191	GS 350/460/450h	2008	15,759	5,384	32,828^{‡}
GRS191/GRS196/URS191/GWS191	GS 350/460/450h	2009	7,430,	1,777	11,565^{‡}
GRS191/GRS196/URS191/GWS191	GS 350/460/450h	2010	7,059		
GRS191/GRS196/URS191/GWS191	GS 350/460/450h	2011	3,746		
ARL10/GRL10/GRL11/GRL15/GRL16/GWL10/URL10	GS 200t/350/450h/F	2012	22,160		
ARL10/GRL10/GRL11/GRL15/GRL16/GWL10/URL10	GS 200t/350/450h/F	2013	19,742		
ARL10/GRL10/GRL11/GRL15/GRL16/GWL10/URL10	GS 200t/350/450h/F	2014	22,198		
ARL10/GRL10/GRL11/GRL15/GRL16/GWL10/URL10	GS 200t/350/450h/F	2015	23,117		
ARL10/GRL10/GRL11/GRL15/GRL16/GWL10/URL10	GS 200t/350/450h/F	2016	14,878		
ARL10/GRL10/GRL11/GRL15/GRL16/GWL10/URL10	GS 200t/350/450h/F	2017			
ARL10/GRL10/GRL11/GRL15/GRL16/GWL10/URL10	GS 200t/350/450h/F	2018	6,604		
ARL10/GRL10/GRL11/GRL15/GRL16/GWL10/URL10	GS 200t/350/450h/F	2019	3,378		
ARL10/GRL10/GRL11/GRL15/GRL16/GWL10/URL10	GS 200t/350/450h/F	2020	2,560		
ARL10/GRL10/GRL11/GRL15/GRL16/GWL10/URL10	GS 200t/350/450h/F	2021	76		

== Technical specifications ==
Model configurations by region
Chassis code	Model no.	Model year(s)	Drivetrain	Transmission	Engine type	Engine code	Region(s)
GRS190	GS 300	2006–2012	RWD/AWD	6-speed AT	3.0 L gasoline V6	3GR-FSE	Australia, China, Europe, Middle East
GRS191	GS 350	2007–2012	RWD/AWD	6-speed AT	3.5 L gasoline V6	2GR-FSE	Canada, Europe, Japan, United States
UZS190	GS 430	2006–2007	RWD	6-speed AT	4.3 L gasoline V8	3UZ-FE	Middle East
GWS191	GS 450h	2007–2012	RWD	CVT	3.5 L hybrid V6	2GR-FSE	Canada, China, Europe, Japan, United States
URS190	GS 460	2008–2012	RWD	8-speed AT	4.6 L gasoline V8	1UR-FE	Australia, Canada, China, Europe, Japan, United States

Drivetrain specifications by generation
Model year(s)	Model no(s).	Chassis code(s)	Engine type	Engine code	Transmission(s)	Power	Torque
1993–1997	GS 300	JZS147	3.0 L I6	2JZ-GE	4-speed AT	168 kW (225 hp; 228 PS) at 5,800 rpm	280 N⋅m (210 lb⋅ft) at 4,800 rpm
1998–2000	GS 400	UZS160	4.0 L V8	1UZ-FE	5-speed AT	224 kW (300 hp; 305 PS) at 6,000 rpm	420 N⋅m (310 lb⋅ft) at 4,000 rpm
1998–2004	GS 300	JZS160	3.0 L I6	2JZ-GE	5-speed AT	168 kW (225 hp; 228 PS) at 6,000 rpm	300 N⋅m (220 lb⋅ft) at 4,000 rpm
2001–2005	GS 430	UZS161	4.3 L V8	3UZ-FE	5-speed AT	224 kW (300 hp; 305 PS) at 5,600 rpm	441 N⋅m (325 lb⋅ft) at 4,000 rpm
2006–2007	GS 300	GRS190	3.0 L V6	3GR-FSE	6-speed AT	188 kW (252 hp; 256 PS) at 6,200 rpm	310 N⋅m (230 lb⋅ft) at 3,600 rpm
2006–2007	GS 300 AWD	GRS195	3.0 L V6	3GR-FSE	6-speed AT	188 kW (252 hp; 256 PS) at 6,200 rpm	310 N⋅m (230 lb⋅ft) at 3,600 rpm
2006–2007	GS 430	UZS190	4.3 L V8	3UZ-FE	6-speed AT	216 kW (290 hp; 294 PS) at 5,600 rpm	434 N⋅m (320 lb⋅ft) at 4,000 rpm
2007–2012	GS 450h	GWS191	3.5 L V6 hybrid	2GR-FSE	CVT	253 kW (339 hp; 344 PS) at 6,400 rpm	490 N⋅m (360 lb⋅ft) at 4,600 rpm
2007–2012	GS 350	GRS191	3.5 L V6	2GR-FSE	6-speed AT	226 kW (303 hp; 307 PS) at 6,200 rpm	371 N⋅m (274 lb⋅ft) at 3,600 rpm
2008–2012	GS 350 AWD	GRS196	3.5 L V6	2GR-FSE	6-speed AT	226 kW (303 hp; 307 PS) at 6,200 rpm	371 N⋅m (274 lb⋅ft) at 3,600 rpm
2008–2012	GS 460	URS190	4.6 L V8	1UR-FE	8-speed AT	255 kW (342 hp; 347 PS) at 6,200 rpm	460 N⋅m (340 lb⋅ft) at 3,900 rpm
2012–2015	GS 250	GRL11	2.5L V6	4GR-FSE	6-speed AT	158 kW (215 hp; 218 PS) at 6,400 rpm	260 N⋅m (190 lb⋅ft) at 3,800 rpm
2013	GS 350	GRL10	3.5 L V6	2GR-FSE	6-speed AT	228 kW (306 hp; 310 PS) at 6,200 rpm	376 N⋅m (277 lb⋅ft) at 3,900 rpm
2013	GS 350 AWD	GRL15	3.5 L V6	2GR-FSE	6-speed AT	228 kW (306 hp; 310 PS) at 6,200 rpm	376 N⋅m (277 lb⋅ft) at 3,900 rpm
2013–2020	GS 450h	GWL10	3.5 L V6 hybrid	2GR-FXE	two-stage CVT	218 kW (292 hp; 296 PS) at 6,400 rpm	490 N⋅m (360 lb⋅ft) at 4,600 rpm
2014–2015	GS 350	GRL10	3.5 L V6	2GR-FSE	8-speed AT	228 kW (306 hp; 310 PS) at 6,200 rpm	376 N⋅m (277 lb⋅ft) at 3,900 rpm
2014–2015	GS 350 AWD	GRL15	3.5 L V6	2GR-FSE	6-speed AT	228 kW (306 hp; 310 PS) at 6,200 rpm	376 N⋅m (277 lb⋅ft) at 3,900 rpm
2016–2017	GS 200t	ARL10	2.0 L I4 turbo	8AR-FTS	8-speed AT	180 kW (240 hp; 240 PS) at 4,800–5,600 rpm	350 N⋅m (260 lb⋅ft) at 1,650–4,000 rpm
2016–2020	GS 350	GRL12	3.5 L V6	2GR-FKS	8-speed AT	232 kW (311 hp; 315 PS) at 6,600 rpm	380 N⋅m (280 lb⋅ft) at 4,800 rpm
2016–2020	GS 350 AWD	GRL16	3.5 L V6	2GR-FKS	6-speed AT	232 kW (311 hp; 315 PS) at 6,600 rpm	380 N⋅m (280 lb⋅ft) at 4,800 rpm
2016–2020	GS F	URL10	5.0 L V8	2UR-GSE	8-speed AT	348 kW (467 hp; 473 PS) at 6,600 rpm	530 N⋅m (390 lb⋅ft) at 5,200 rpm
2018–2020	GS 300	ARL10	2.0 L I4 turbo	8AR-FTS	8-speed AT	180 kW (240 hp; 240 PS) at 4,800–5,600 rpm	350 N⋅m (260 lb⋅ft) at 1,650–4,000 rpm

== Awards ==
- J.D. Power and Associates named the GS series the best midsize luxury car in initial quality for 2002, 2003, 2004, and 2005.
- AAA named the third generation GS 300 the best car in its class for 2005.
- Consumer Reports awarded the Lexus GS as the highest ranked vehicle in predicted reliability in the luxury car class in 2005.
- The GS 450h's Lexus Hybrid Drive system was the recipient of the annual Paul Pietsch Prize for Advanced Technology in 2007, awarded by technical editors of Auto Motor Und Sport publications.
- The Lexus GS 450h was named the winner of the 2007 IF product design award from the International Forum Design group in Hannover, Germany.
- German automotive magazine Auto Bild selected the GS 450h for its "Auto 1" award for best sedan in 2007.
- Smart Money magazine named the Lexus GS the best luxury sedan for the 2003–2004 model year. In 2005, the magazine named the GS its Best New Car Value.
- The GS series was named most appealing midsize luxury car by J.D. Power and Associates in 2001.
- The first generation GS series was named to the Top Ten in Initial Quality list by J.D. Power and Associates in 1994.
- Kelley Blue Book gave the GS series its Best to Hold Value Award in 1998, 1999, 2000, and 2001.
- The second generation GS was named Import Car of the Year by Motor Trend in 1998.
- Car and Driver named the second generation GS to its Ten Best list in 1998, 1999, and 2000.
