= Toyota UZ engine =

Toyota UZ Engine
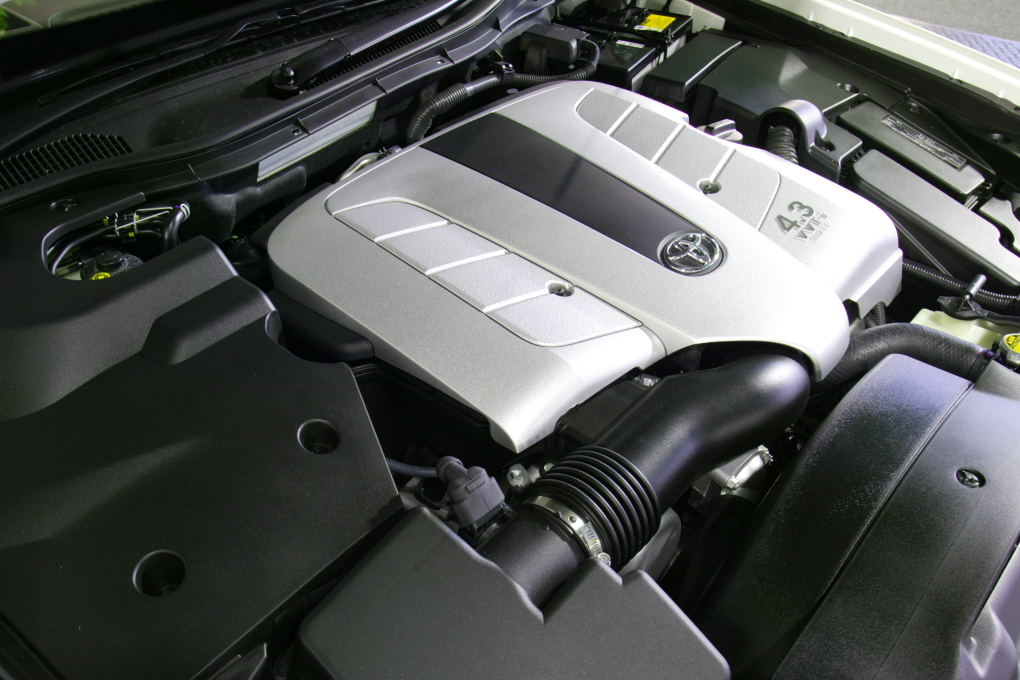
- 3UZ-FE engine

Overview
- Manufacturer: Toyota Motor Corporation
- Production: 1989–2013

Layout
- Configuration: 90° V8
- Valvetrain: DOHC 4 valves x cyl. w/VVT-i

Combustion
- Fuel system: Multi-point fuel injection
- Fuel type: Gasoline
- Cooling system: Water cooled

Output
- Power output: 191–373 kW (256–500 hp; 260–507 PS)
- Torque output: 353–441 N⋅m (260–325 lb⋅ft)

Chronology
- Predecessor: Toyota V engine
- Successor: Toyota UR engine

The Toyota UZ engine family is a gasoline fueled 32-valve quad-camshaft V8 piston engine series used in Toyota's luxury offerings and sport utility vehicles. Three variants have been produced: the 1UZ-FE, 2UZ-FE, and 3UZ-FE. Production spanned 24 years, from 1989 to mid 2013, ending with the final production of the 3UZ-FE-powered Toyota Crown Majesta I-FOUR. Toyota's UZ engine family was replaced by the UR engine family.

== 1UZ-FE ==
1UZ-FE
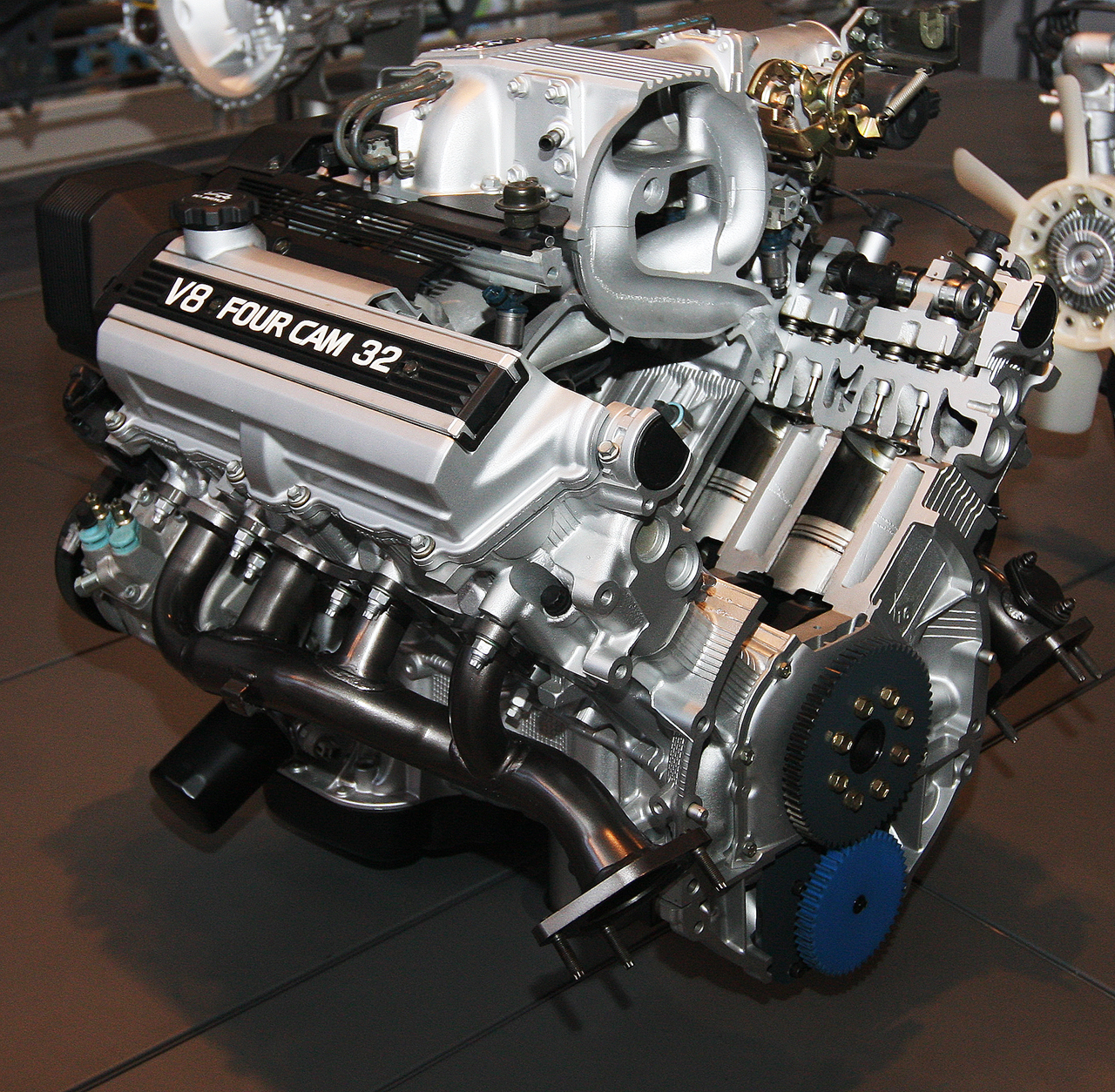
- 1UZ-FE (rear view)

Layout
- Displacement: 4.0 L (3,969 cc)
- Cylinder bore: 87.5 mm (3.44 in)
- Piston stroke: 82.5 mm (3.25 in)

The 4.0 L (3,969 cc; 242.2 cu in) all-alloy 1UZ-FE debuted in 1989 in the first generation Lexus LS 400/Toyota Celsior and the engine was progressively released across a number of other models in the Toyota/Lexus range. The engine is oversquare by design, with a bore and stroke size of 87.5 mm × 82.5 mm (3.44 in × 3.25 in). It has proven to be a strong, reliable and smooth powerplant with features such as 6-bolt main bearings and belt-driven quad-camshafts. The water pump is also driven by the timing/cam belt. The connecting rods and crankshaft are constructed of steel. The pistons are hypereutectic.

The FV2400-2TC derivative is one of the few road-going engines that is FAA approved for use in an airplane.

Its resemblance to a race engine platform (6 bolt cross mains and oversquare configuration) was confirmed in 2007 by David Currier (in an interview with v-eight.com), vice president of TRD USA, stating that the 1UZ platform was based on CART/IRL engine design. It was planned to be used on GT500 vehicles; its subsequent use in the Daytona Prototype had not been planned.

In its original, Japanese domestic market trim with 10.0:1 compression, power output is 191 kW JIS (256 hp; 260 PS), torque of 353 N⋅m (260 lb⋅ft). The European-market version produces a claimed 245 PS DIN (180 kW; 242 hp).

The engine was slightly revised in 1995 with lighter connecting rods and pistons and an increased compression ratio to 10.4:1, resulting in peak power of 195 kW (261 hp; 265 PS) at 5,400 rpm and torque of 365 N⋅m (269 lb⋅ft) at 4,400 rpm.

In 1997, Toyota's VVT-i variable valve timing technology was introduced along with a further compression ratio increase to 10.5:1, bumping power and torque to 216 kW (290 hp; 294 PS) at 5,900 rpm and 407 N⋅m (300 lb⋅ft) at 4,100 rpm. For the GS 400, output was rated at 224 kW (300 hp; 305 PS) at 6,000 rpm and 420 N⋅m (310 lbf⋅ft) at 4,000 rpm.

The 1UZ-FE was voted to the Ward's 10 Best Engines list for 1998 through 2000.

Applications (calendar years):

- Lexus LS 400/Toyota Celsior (1989–2000)
- Toyota Crown/Toyota Crown Majesta (1989–2002)
- Toyota HiAce HiMedic Ambulance (1989–2004) (Japan only)
- Lexus SC 400/Toyota Soarer (1991–2000)
- Toyota Aristo (1992–1997)
- Lexus GS 400 (1997–2000)
- SARD MC8/MC8-R (1995–1997)
- Mooncraft Shiden MC/RT-16 (2006–2012) (non-production)

== 2UZ-FE ==
2UZ-FE
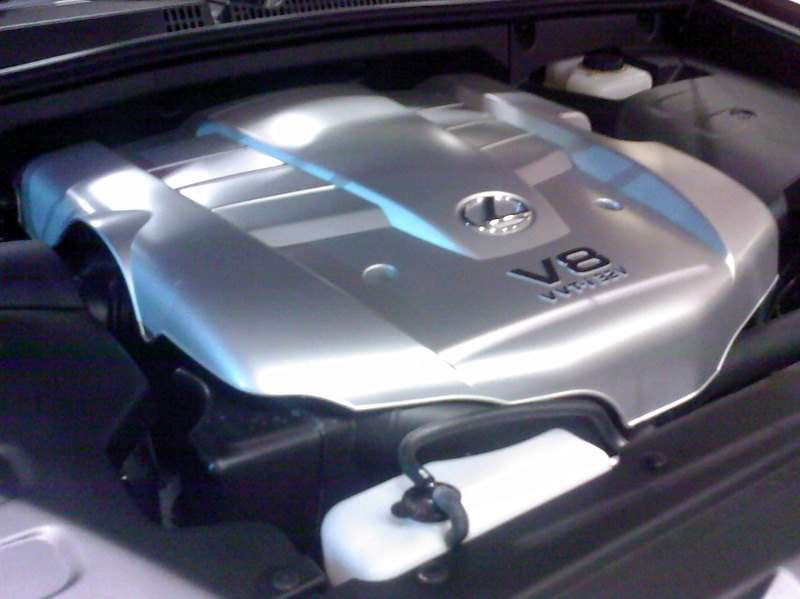

Layout
- Displacement: 4.7 L (4,664 cc)
- Cylinder bore: 94 mm (3.70 in)
- Piston stroke: 84 mm (3.31 in)

The 2UZ-FE was a 4.7 L; 284.6 cu in (4,663 cc) version built in Tahara, Aichi, Japan and at Toyota Motor Manufacturing Alabama. Unlike its other UZ counterparts, this version uses a cast iron block to increase durability, as it was designed for low-revving, high-torque pickup and SUV applications. Its bore and stroke is 94 mm × 84 mm (3.70 in × 3.31 in). Output varies by implementation, but one VVT-i variant produces 202 kW (271 hp; 275 PS) at 4800 rpm with 427 N⋅m (315 lb⋅ft) of torque at 3400 rpm. Japanese market models produce 173 kW (232 hp; 235 PS) at 4800 rpm and 422 N⋅m (311 lb⋅ft) at 3600 rpm, Australian models produce 170 kW (228 hp; 231 PS) at 4800 rpm and 410 N⋅m (302 lbf⋅ft) at 3600 rpm, and North American models produce 175–179 kW (235–240 hp; 238–243 PS) at 4800 rpm and 427 N⋅m (315 lb⋅ft) at 3400 rpm.

Like the 1UZ-FE, it has aluminum DOHC cylinder heads, multi-port fuel injection, 4 valves per cylinder with bucket tappets, one-piece cast camshafts, and a cast aluminum intake manifold. For 2010, it was replaced by the 1UR-FE or 3UR-FE, depending on the country.

Applications (calendar years):

- Lexus GX 470 (2002–2004)
- Lexus LX 470 (1998–2005)
- Toyota Land Cruiser (1998–2005)
- Toyota 4Runner (2002–2004)
- Toyota Tundra (1999–2004)
- Toyota Sequoia (2000–2004)

Toyota Racing Development offered a bolt-on supercharger kit for the 2000–2003 Tundra/Sequoia and the 1998–2003 LX 470.

Another 2UZ-FE variation adds VVT-i, electronic throttle control, and a plastic intake manifold.

Applications (calendar years):

- Lexus GX 470 (2004–2009)
- Lexus LX 470 (2005–2007)
- Toyota 4Runner (2005–2009)
- Toyota Land Cruiser (2005–2011)
- Toyota Tundra (2005–2009)
- Toyota Sequoia (2004–2009)
- Lexus LX 470 (2007–2012) (Hong Kong only)

== 3UZ-FE ==
3UZ-FE
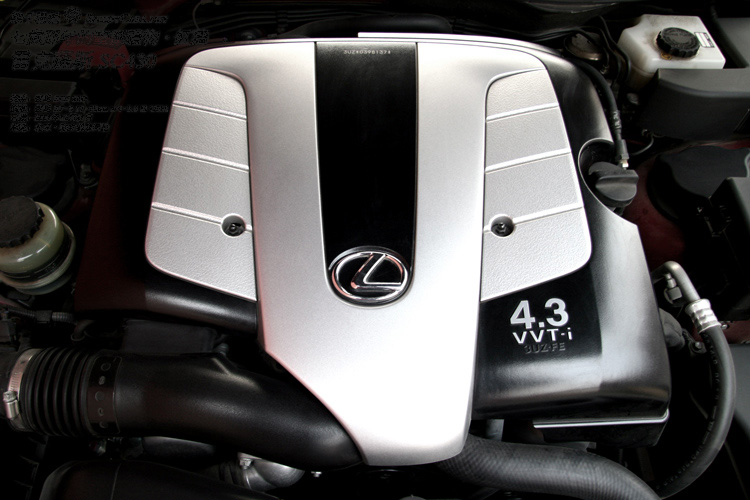

Layout
- Displacement: 4.3 L (4,293 cc)
- Cylinder bore: 91 mm (3.58 in)
- Piston stroke: 82.5 mm (3.25 in)

The 3UZ-FE is a 4.3 L; 261.9 cu in (4,292 cc) version built in Japan. Bore and stroke is 91 mm × 82.5 mm (3.58 in × 3.25 in) . Output is 216 to 224 kW (290 to 300 hp; 294 to 305 PS) at 5600 rpm with 441 N⋅m (325 lb⋅ft) of torque at 3400 rpm. The engine block and heads are aluminum. It has a DOHC valvetrain with 4 valves per cylinder and VVT-i. It uses sequential electronic fuel injection (SEFI). In 2003, the engine was paired with a six-speed automatic transmission, resulting in improved fuel economy over the previous five-speed automatic. The maximum engine speed is 6,500 RPM.

A 4.5 L version replaced the 3S-GTE as the engine used in Toyota's 500 hp (373 kW) Super GT race cars up to 2009 and a 5.0 L version was used in the Grand American Road Racing (Grand Am) Series.

Applications (calendar years):

- Lexus LS 430 (2000–2006)
- Lexus GS 430 (2000–2007)
- Lexus SC 430/Toyota Soarer (2001–2010)
- Toyota Crown Majesta (2004–2013)
- Hongqi HQ430 (2006–2010)
- Super GT
  - Toyota Supra GT500 Race Car (2003–2005)
  - Lexus SC 430 GT500 Race Car (2006–2008)

== Derivatives ==
=== FV2400-2TC ===
In 1997, the US Federal Aviation Administration granted production certification for the FV2400-2TC, a twin-turbocharged airplane powerplant based on the 1UZ-FE. The 360 hp (268 kW; 365 PS) FV2400 was developed in partnership with Hamilton Standard, which provided the digital engine-control system. The goal was to produce a four-seat propeller aircraft.

=== VT300i ===
In 1998, a marine derivative of the UZ powerplant was produced for boating applications. The 4.0 L VT300i engine, producing 224 kW; 304 PS (300 hp) at 6000 rpm and 420 N⋅m (310 lb⋅ft) at 4200 rpm, used the same block as the UZ engine on the Lexus SC 400, GS 400, and LS 400.

Applications (calendar years):

- Toyota Epic S21 (1998)
- Toyota Epic S22/SX22 (1999–2001)
- Toyota Epic X22 (1999–2001)

== See also ==
- List of Toyota engines
