= Toyota GZ engine =

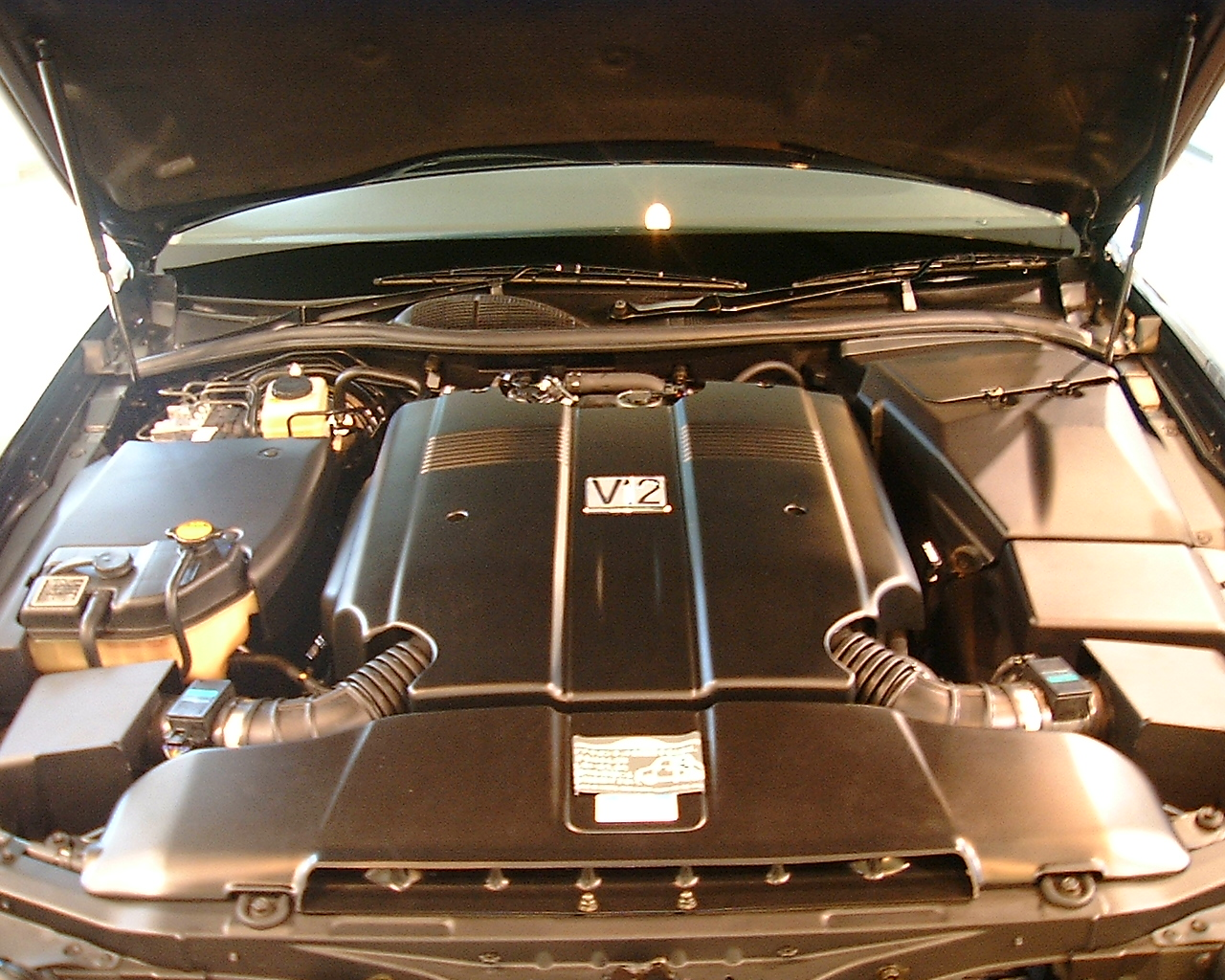
- Toyota's 1GZ-FE engine installed in the GZG50 Century

Overview
- Manufacturer: Toyota
- Production: 1997–2017

Layout
- Configuration: 60° V12
- Displacement: 4,996 cc (304.9 cu in)
- Cylinder bore: 81 mm (3.189 in)
- Piston stroke: 80.8 mm (3.181 in)
- Valvetrain: DOHC
- Compression ratio: 10.5:1

Combustion
- Fuel system: Electronic port fuel injection
- Fuel type: Gasoline
- Cooling system: Water-cooled

Output
- Power output: 206 kW (276 hp; 280 PS) (official); 229 kW (308 hp; 312 PS) (actual, estimated)
- Specific power: 41.2 kW (55.2 hp; 56 PS) per liter (official); 45.9 kW (61.5 hp; 62.4 PS) per liter (actual, estimated)
- Torque output: 481 N⋅m (355 lb⋅ft)

Chronology
- Predecessor: Toyota V engine (V8)
- Successor: Toyota 2UR-FSE engine (V8)

The Toyota GZ engine family consists of a single model, the 1GZ-FE. This engine is used as the powerplant for the second generation Century limousine from 1997 to 2017.

== 1GZ-FE ==
The 1GZ-FE is a 4,996 cc (5.0 L) 48-valve DOHC V12 engine with variable valve timing (VVT-i). Bore is 81 mm and stroke is 80.8 mm, with a compression ratio of 10.5:1. The official power output advertised in Japan per the gentlemen's agreement is 206 kW (276 hp; 280 PS) at 5,200 rpm, though it was advertised as 220 kW (295 hp; 299 PS) in export markets. Peak torque of 481 N⋅m (355 lbf⋅ft) is at 4,000 rpm with over 400 N⋅m (295 lbf⋅ft) available from as little as 1200 rpm. The Electronic fuel-injection system is controlled by two ECUs, one for each bank of six cylinders. The engine is capable of running on either bank should a malfunction occur.

In 2010 the standard engine was revised in order to meet tough fuel economy and emissions standards, reducing power slightly and peak torque to 460 N⋅m (339 lbf⋅ft) although this torque figure had been advertised in export markets since at least 2004.

=== Applications ===
- 1997–2017 Toyota Century (GZG50)
- 2006–2008 Toyota Century Royal (GZG51)

== 1GZ-FNE ==
A version is available running on compressed natural gas which produces 190 kW (255 hp) and 405 N⋅m (299 lbf⋅ft).

=== Applications ===
- 2003–2004 Toyota Century

== See also ==
- List of Toyota engines
- Acoustic Control Induction System
