= Century (marque) =

Japanese luxury vehicle brand owned by Toyota

- Type: Division
- Industry: Automotive
- Founded: October 2025; 12 months ago
- Founder: Akio Toyoda
- Headquarters: Japan
- Area served: Worldwide
- Products: Luxury vehicles
- Parent: Toyota Motor Corporation
- Website: century-100.com

Century (Japanese: センチュリー, Hepburn: Senchurī) is the Japanese ultra luxury division of Toyota, slotted above Lexus. It competes with rival ultra luxury brands such as Rolls-Royce, Mercedes-Maybach, and Bentley.

The Century brand was spun off from Toyota in October 2025, previously being Toyota's flagship model; the Toyota Century.

== History ==
The Century nameplate had been used by Toyota since 1967. It was primarily sold in Japan in the luxury market.

On October 16, 2025, Akio Toyoda, the chief business executive (chairman) of the Toyota Motor Corporation announced that the Century nameplate would be spun off into its own separate brand and that the Century would be slotted above Lexus. Additionally, the brand's identity will be focused on handcrafted ultra-luxury automobiles and will for the first time be sold globally, with a select few markets being testing grounds for further expansion. It competes with other luxury brands such as Rolls-Royce and Bentley.

Two of the pre-existing Century models, the Century sedan and Century SUV will fall under the umbrella of the Century marque. Additionally, a Century coupe concept is being planned as an additional third model.

== Models ==
=== Current production vehicles ===
Model
Sedans
Century Sedan
SUVs
Century SUV

=== Concept vehicles ===
- Century coupe concept (2025)
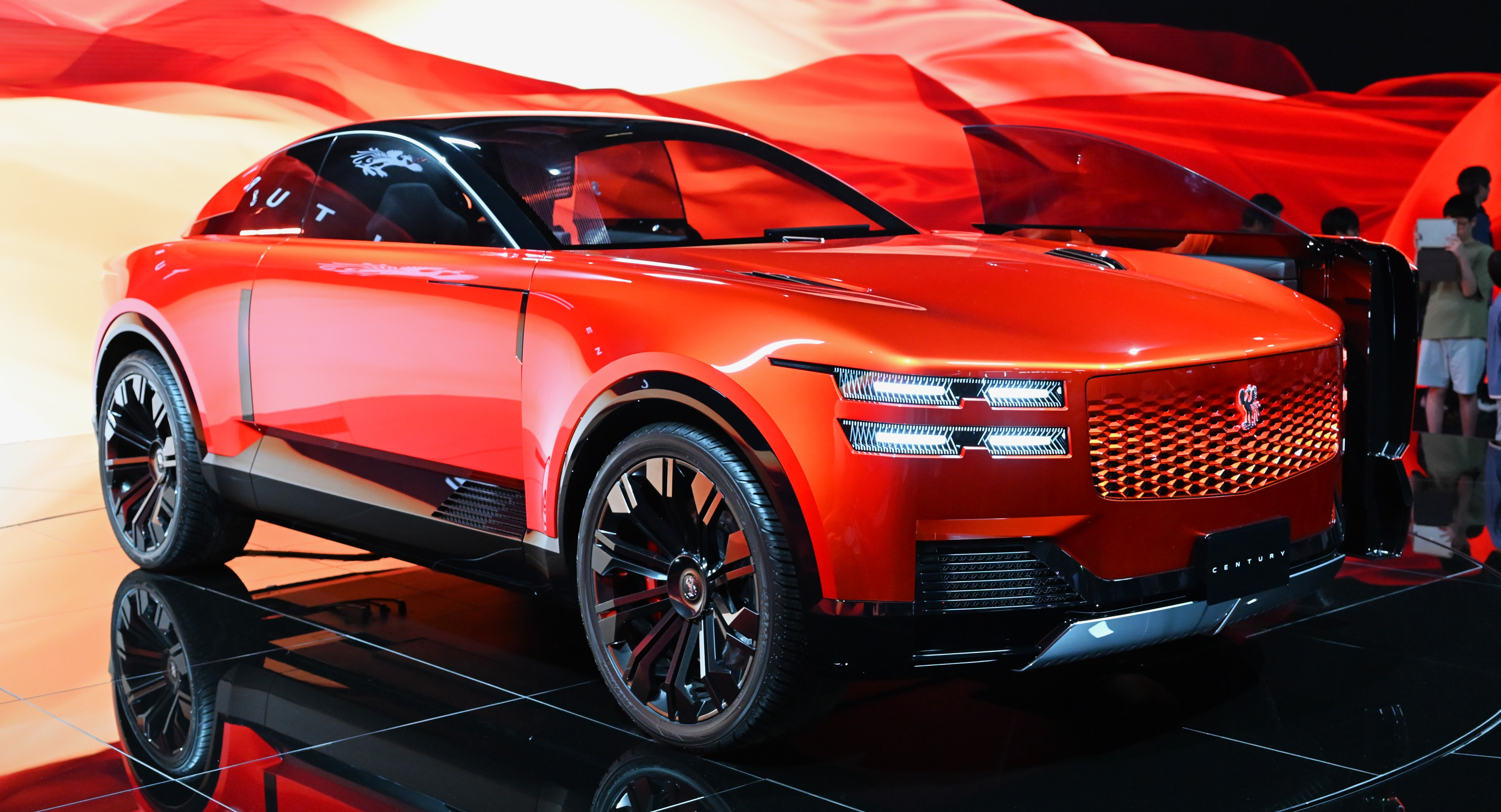
Century coupe concept
