= Toyota Century =

Full-size luxury car

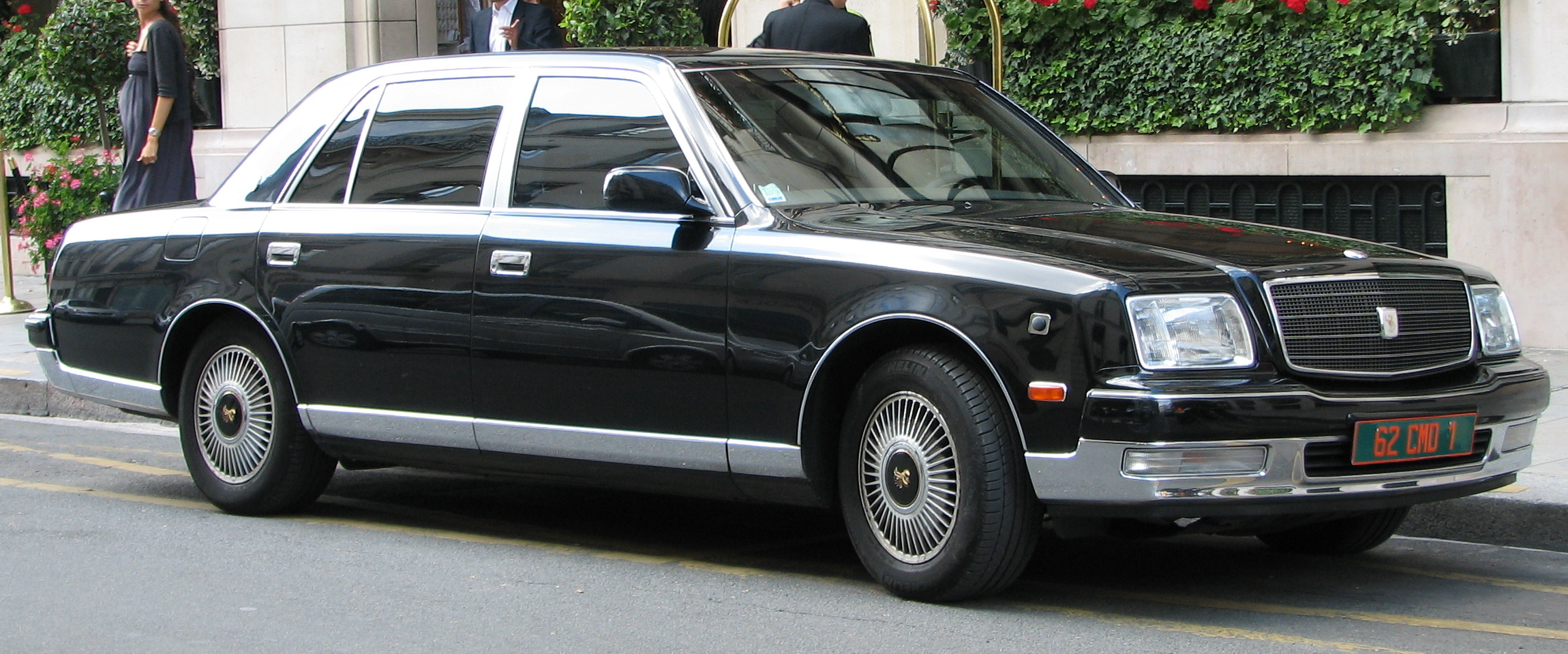

Overview
- Manufacturer: Toyota
- Production: November 1967 – present (limousine); September 2023 – present (SUV)

Body and chassis
- Class: Full-size luxury car (F); Ultra-luxury car
- Body style: 4-door limousine; 5-door SUV (2023–present)
- Layout: Longitudinal front-engine, rear-wheel-drive (limousine); Transverse front-engine, four-wheel-drive (SUV)

Chronology
- Predecessor: Toyota Crown Eight (G10)

The Toyota Century (Japanese: トヨタ・センチュリー, Hepburn: Toyota Senchurī) is a line of full-size luxury cars and limousines produced mainly for the Japanese market, serving as Toyota's flagship car within Japan. Globally the unrelated Lexus brand houses Toyota's flagship luxury model. Production began in 1967, and the model received only minor changes until redesigns in 1997 and 2018.

The Century derives its name from the 100th birthday of Sakichi Toyoda (born 14 February 1867), the founder of Toyota Industries. It is often used by the Imperial House of Japan, the Prime Minister of Japan, senior Japanese government leaders, and high-level executive businessmen. The Century is comparable in purpose to the Austin Princess/Daimler DS420, Cadillac Series 70, Mercedes-Maybach, Hongqi, Rolls-Royce Phantom, and Russian ZIL limousines.

The first-generation Century was available with only a V8 engine (the third post-war Japanese-built sedan so-equipped) at its introduction in 1967 until a full platform redesign in 1997. The second generation was only installed with a Toyota-designed and -built V12, an engine bespoke to the Century, until 2018, when the power-train reverted to a V8 with the addition of Toyota's hybrid technology.

While the Century is a full-size luxury sedan, it is not available at Japanese Lexus dealerships; it can only be purchased at specifically identified Toyota Store locations. The Century does not feature Toyota's typical oval logo on any of its badges; instead, it uses a phoenix logo unique to the Century. The gold phoenix logo is called the Hō'ō (鳳凰) or Fushichō (不死鳥) from Sinospheric mythology, representing the Imperial House of Japan, and the image can be found throughout Asia, such as the Kinkaku-ji in Kyoto.

The appearance of a black-painted Century is iconic in Asian countries, perceived to denote conservative success. As such, while the model has received some modifications, its external styling has remained largely consistent since introduction. The closest Japanese competitor was the Nissan President, with a similar status reputation although, during the 1960s and 1970s, the high market positioning was also shared with the Mitsubishi Debonair. In the 1970s, two other Japanese competitors introduced large sedans — the Isuzu Statesman de Ville and the Mazda Roadpacer (both derived from Holden products) — which were short-lived. The Century nameplate introduced the SUV body style in 2023. The nameplate was spun off into a separate brand in 2025.

== First generation (G20/G30/G40; 1967) ==
First generation
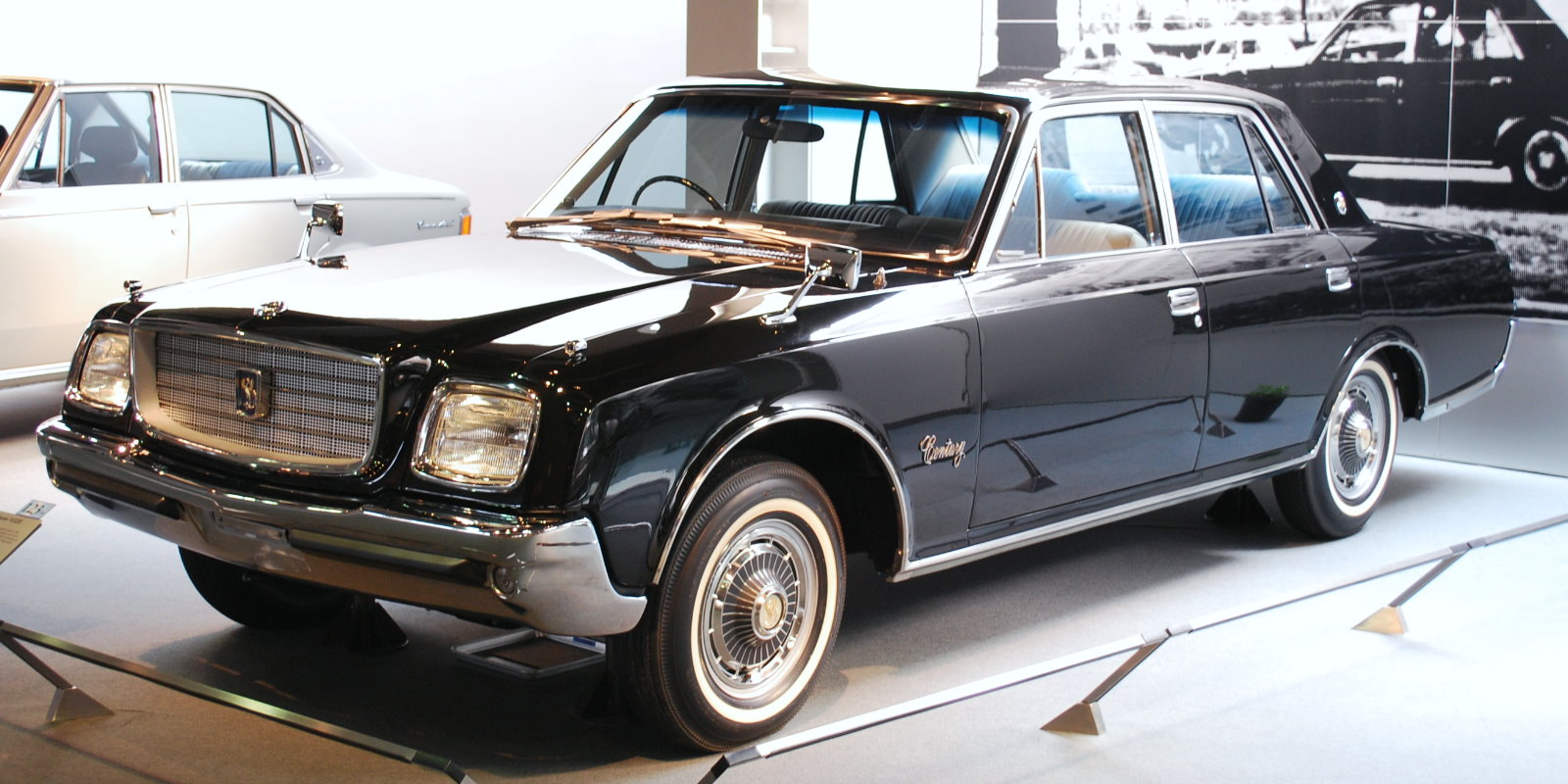
- 1967 Toyota Century (VG20)

Overview
- Model code: G20; G30; G40
- Production: November 1967 – March 1997
- Assembly: Japan: Susono, Shizuoka (Kanto Auto Works)
- Designer: Kenya Nakamura

Powertrain
- Engine: Petrol: 2981 cc 3V V8 (VG20; 1967–1973); 3376 cc 4V V8 (VG21/30/35; 1973–1982); 3994 cc 5V V8 (VG40/45; 1982–1997)
- Power output: 150–190 PS (110–140 kW)
- Transmission: 3/4-speed manual (1967-1974); 3/4-speed automatic

Dimensions
- Wheelbase: 2,860 mm (112.6 in) (standard); 3,010 mm (118.5 in) (L-type); 3,510 mm (138.2 in) (limousine)
- Length: 5,120 mm (201.6 in) (standard); 5,270 mm (207.5 in) (L-type); 5,770 mm (227.2 in) (limousine)
- Width: 1,890 mm (74.4 in)
- Height: 1,430–1,460 mm (56.3–57.5 in)
- Curb weight: 1,760–1,830 kg (3,880–4,030 lb)

The original Century was based on the 1964 Crown Eight, which featured the 2.6 L V8 Toyota V engine, and appeared almost two years after the October 1965 introduction of the 4-litre Nissan President. Apart from minor cosmetic changes and engine upgrades, the design remained largely untouched during its 30-year production run. This appearance has also inspired the designs of subsequent versions, as it remains desired by its clientele. The Century used an electromagnetic door latch that integrated a door lock, and the interior and exterior door handles were electrically operated. The Crown Eight used a button for interior use to release the latch mechanism, while the Century provided a conventional door release handle that remained electrically operated. The Century was given the "VG20" model designation, inheriting the "VG10" designation from the predecessor model.

The 1967 Century was equipped with an upgraded version of the Crown Eight engine, the 3.0 L 3V. In April 1973, the 3.4 L 4V was introduced. It was replaced by the 4V-U two years later, benefitting from the installation of emission control technology Toyota called "TTC". Only column shifters were available at first, with a manual being the base option. The manually shifted versions (Type A and Type B) were discontinued in 1973 and August 1974 respectively. The 3.4-litre V8 received fuel injection in November 1978 (4V-EU), enabling the car to meet the 1978 Emissions Standards. This also meant that the chassis code was changed, to VG35.

The engine was once again changed to the 4.0 L 5V-EU in November 1982 (VG40), along with major facelift. Note that the 3V, 4V, and 5V do not refer to the number of valves in the engine but simply denote model names in the Toyota V engine range. On the "C" pillar there is a badge in blue with a gothic-style "C" for Century with a label "V8" below. The suspension used trailing arms for the front and rear wheels with airbag support springs.

In 1971, automatic climate control became available, an innovation. Along with the change of engine in April 1973 (VG21) a host of other changes took place. The electromagnetic locks were updated, and taillights were changed from a three-bulb sequential turn signals, adding an amber turn signal bulb on the outer edge and front disc brakes. In September 1987, the Century received another light makeover, changing from a hydraulically operated three-speed to an electronically operated four-speed automatic transmission. A floor-mounted shifter became available on a model called the D-type, which also had front bucket seats rather than a full-width bench. The grille received detail changes and the cornering lamps were integrated into the headlight surrounds.

During Japan's Bubble Economy, sales of the Century doubled (from 1,027 in 1985 to 2,117 in 1989).

The Century sedan wasn't enough for those heady days, and in October 1989, the Century Limousine appeared. This was 650 mm (26 in) longer for an overall length of 5,770 mm (227.2 in), on a 3,510 mm (138.2 in) wheelbase, approximately the same dimensions as a Cadillac de Ville series, Lincoln Town Car, Mercedes-Benz S-Class, or a Rolls-Royce Silver Spirit. The Limousine also received a standard padded vinyl roof and an opera window in the centre pillar, where the stretch was placed. It also uses 150 mm wider rear doors, for a more balanced design and ease of entry. An annual production of 60 was planned. As of September 1990, there was also an L-type stretched version of the Century sedan — length is 5,270 mm (207.5 in) with a wheelbase of 3,010 mm (118.5 in); this model uses the same larger rear doors as were fitted to the Century Limousine. In December 1992, the Century received its last makeover, with some very minor changes taking place in late 1994.

A Century with a GT45 gas turbine and electric motor was shown as the Century gas turbine hybrid concept vehicle at the 1975 Tokyo Motor Show.

=== Chassis codes ===
- VG20: 3.0 L 3V V8, 1967–1973
- VG21: 3.4 L 4V V8, 1973–1975
- VG30: 3.4 L 4V-U V8, 1975–January 1977
- C-VG30: January 1977–November 1978 (1977 Emissions Standards)
- E-VG35: November 1978–1982 (1978 Emissions Standards)
- VG40: 4.0 L 5V-EU V8, 1982–1997
- VG45: 4.0 L 5V-EU V8 (L-type) 1990–1997
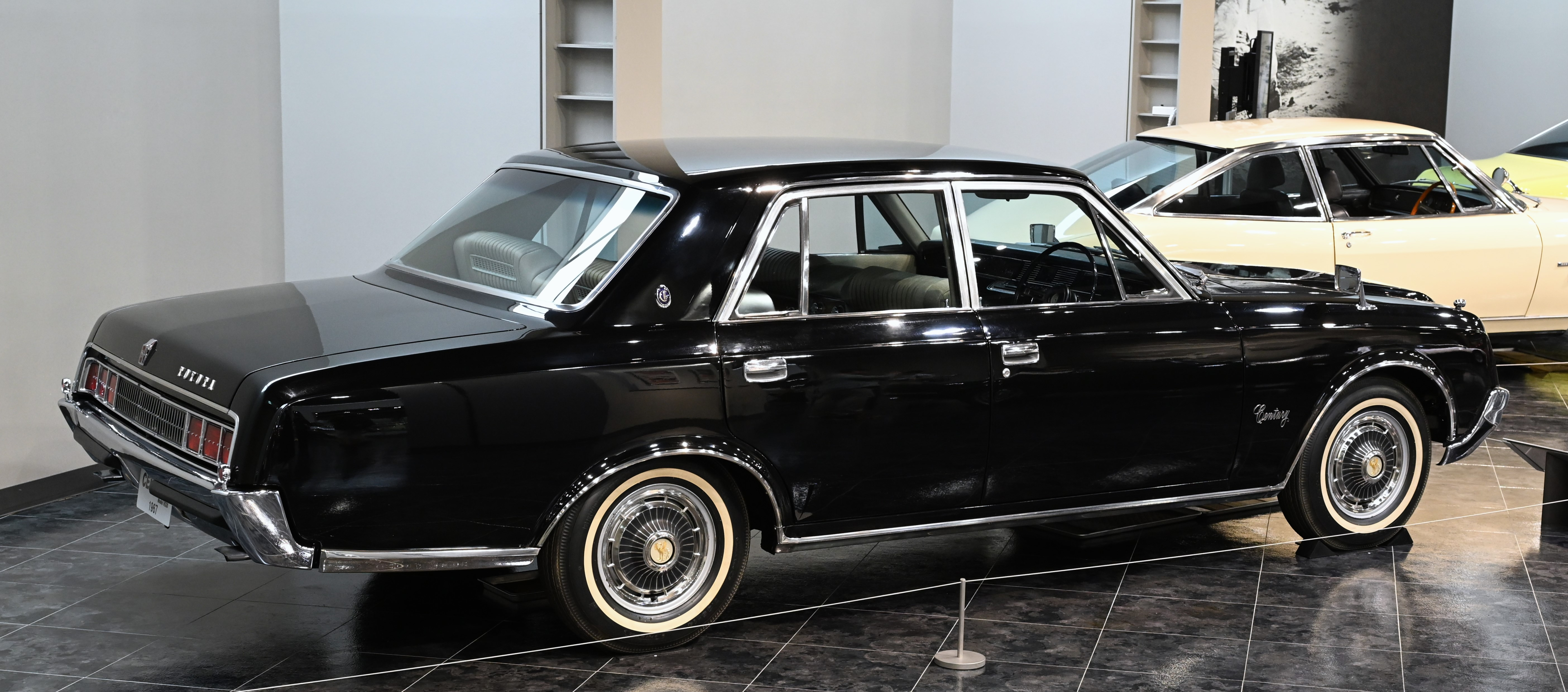
Rear view (VG20)

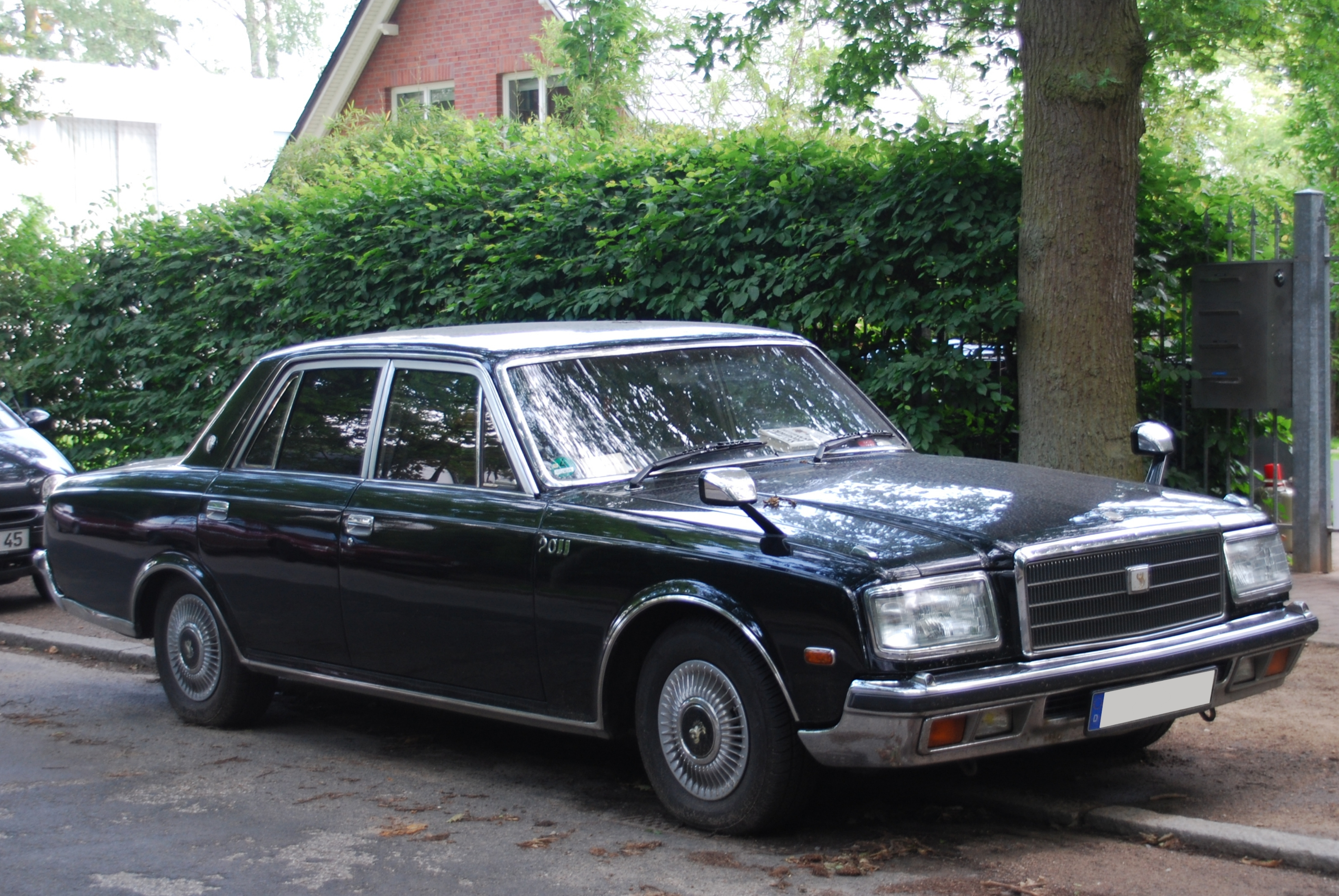
1982 VG40 Century

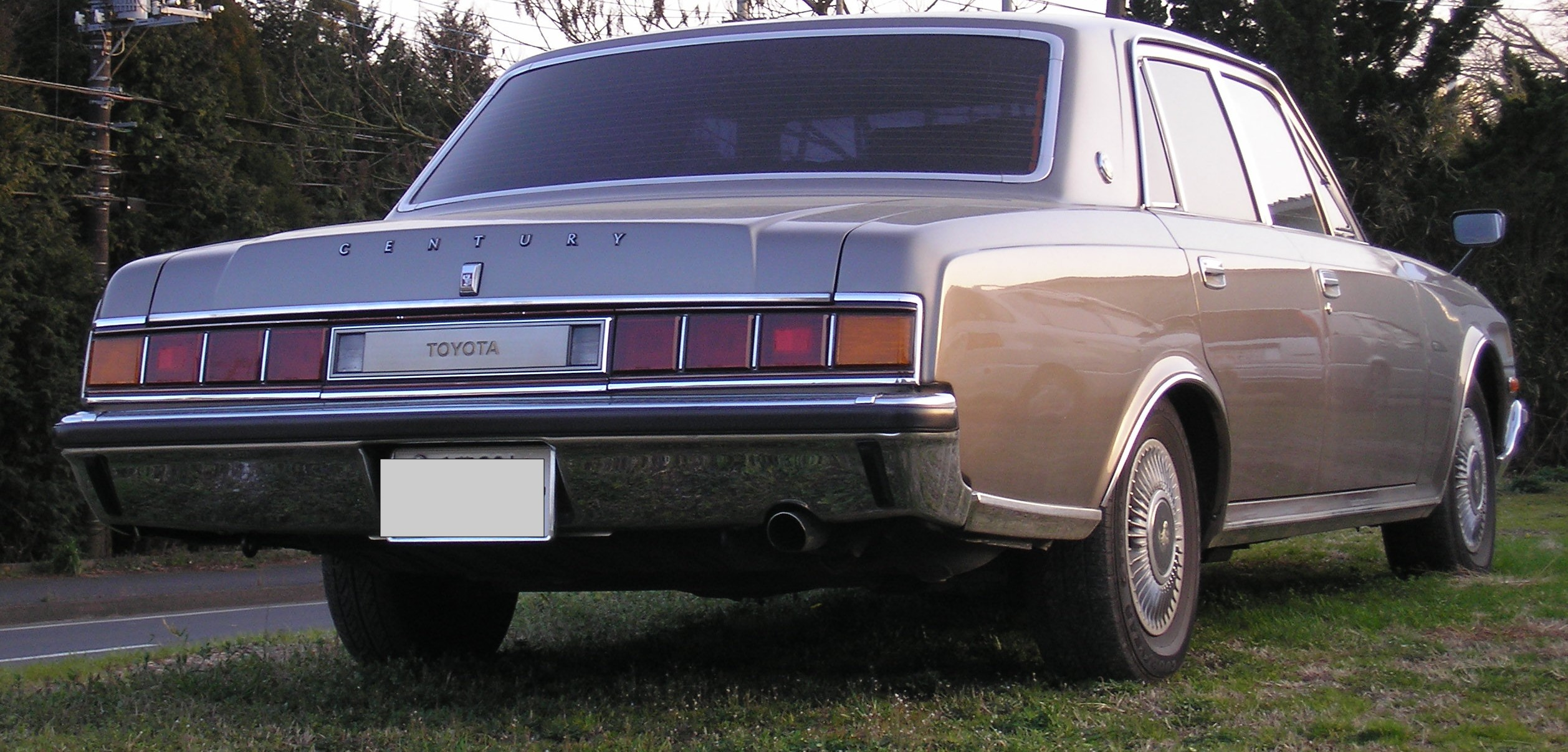
1982 VG40 Century rear

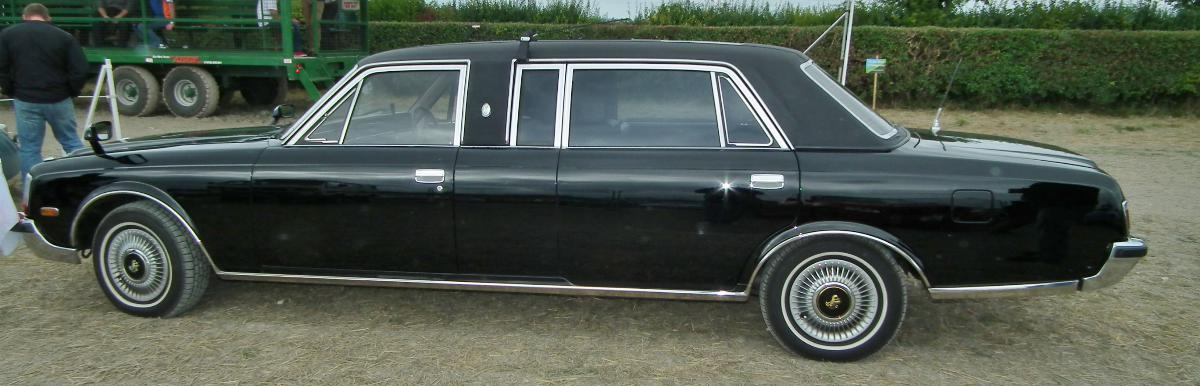
1989 VG40 Century Limousine

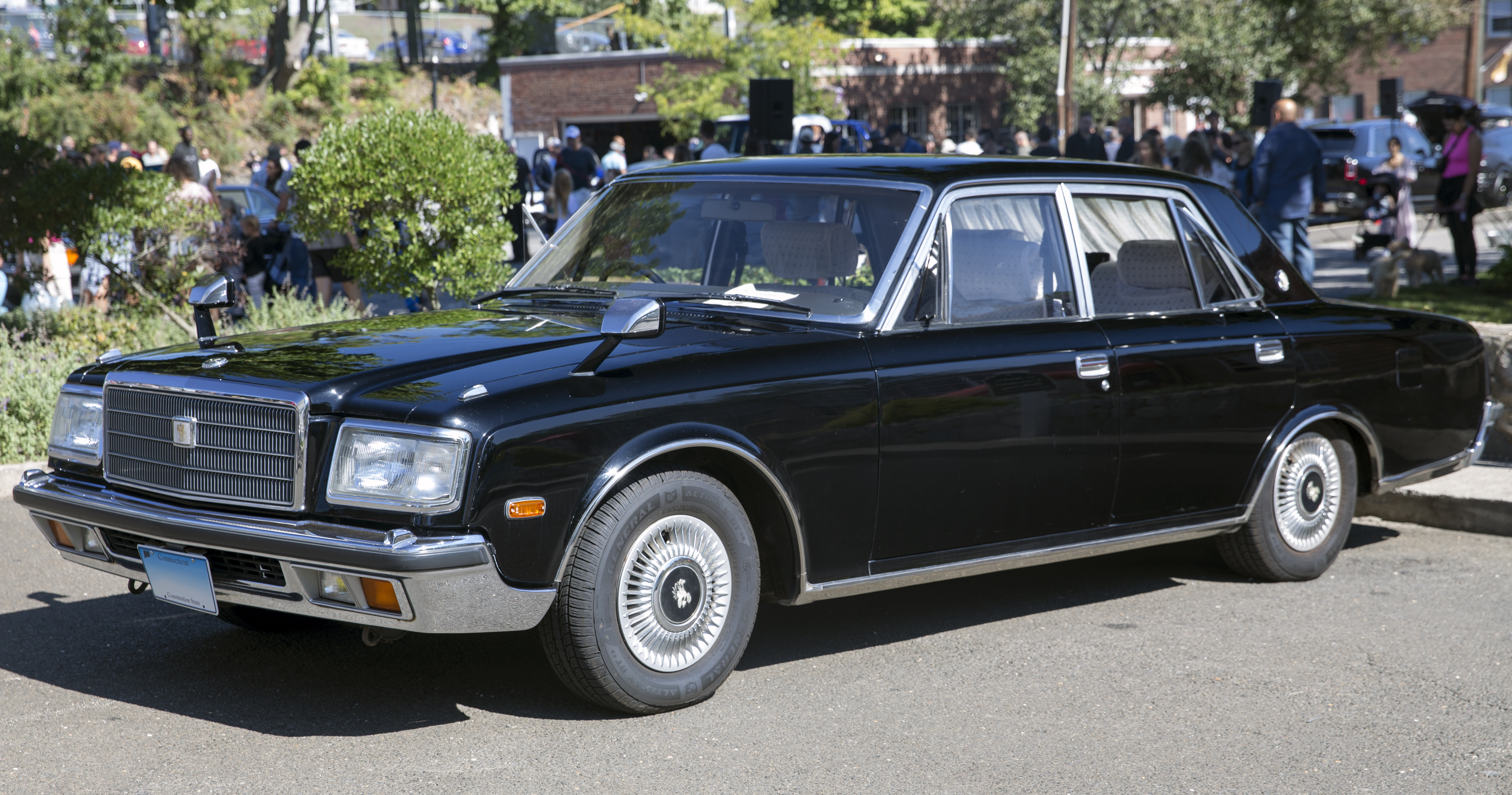
1990 VG40 Century

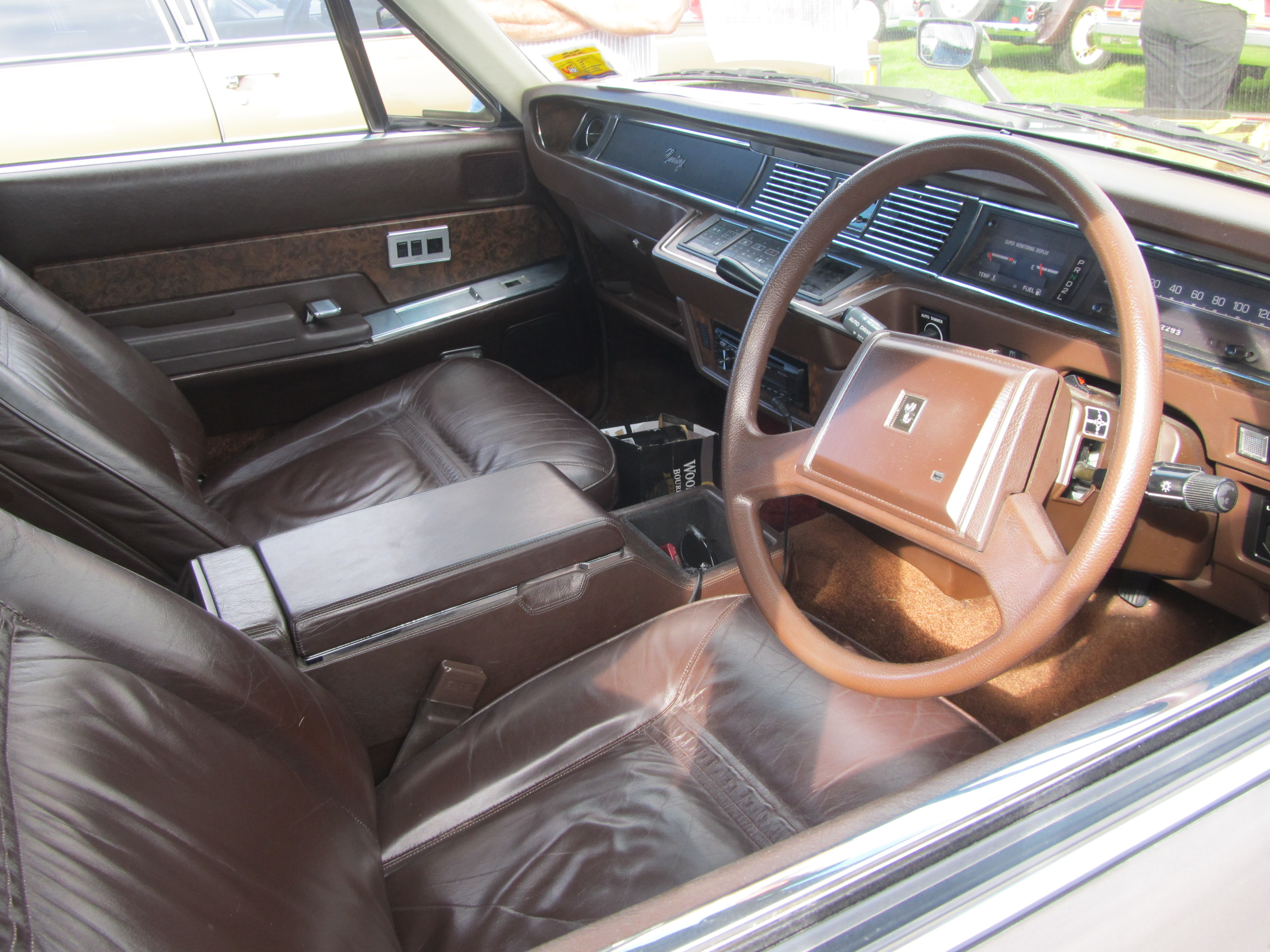
Interior (1982 model)

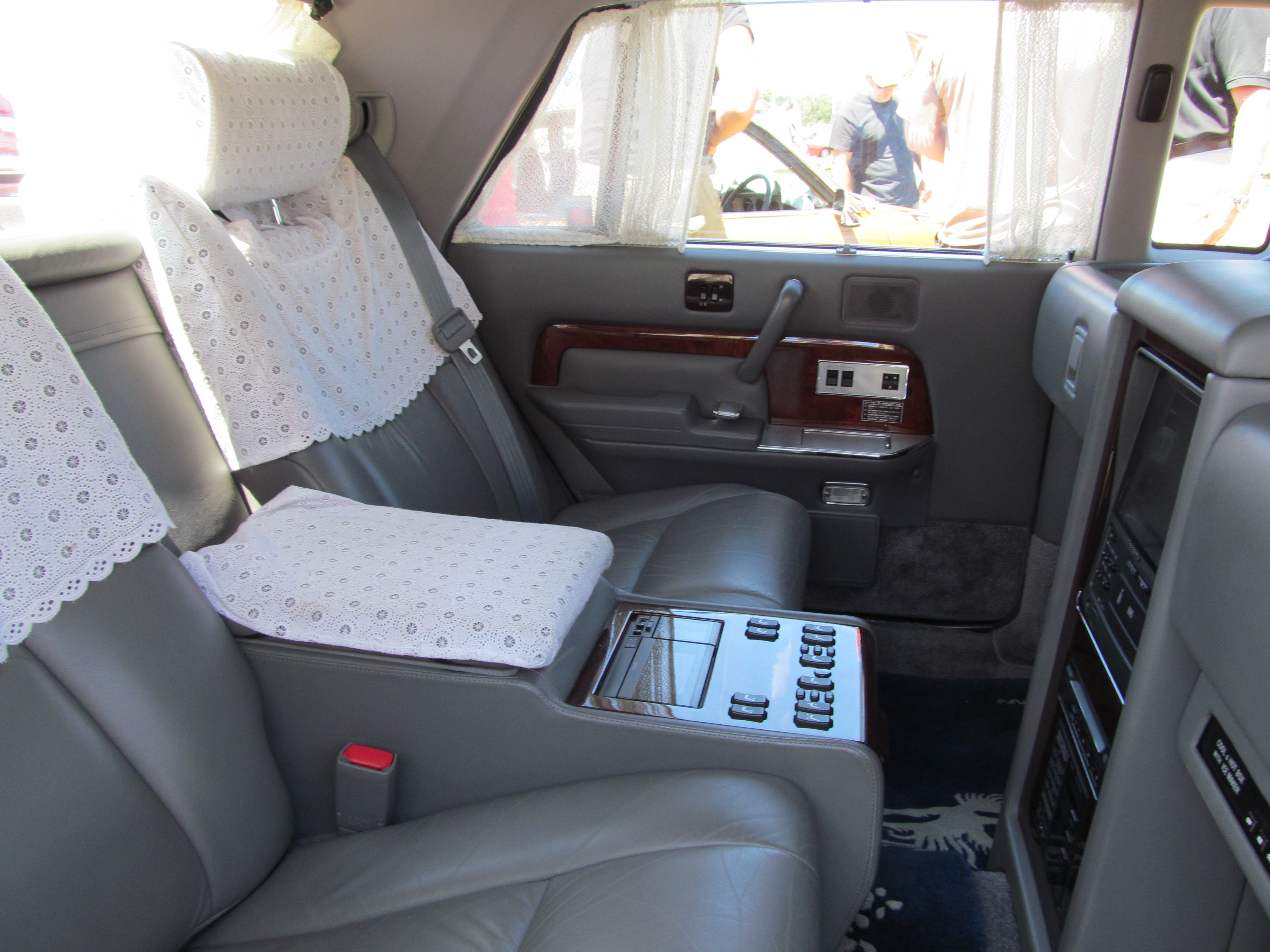
Rear passenger area (Limousine VG45 series) with antimacassars

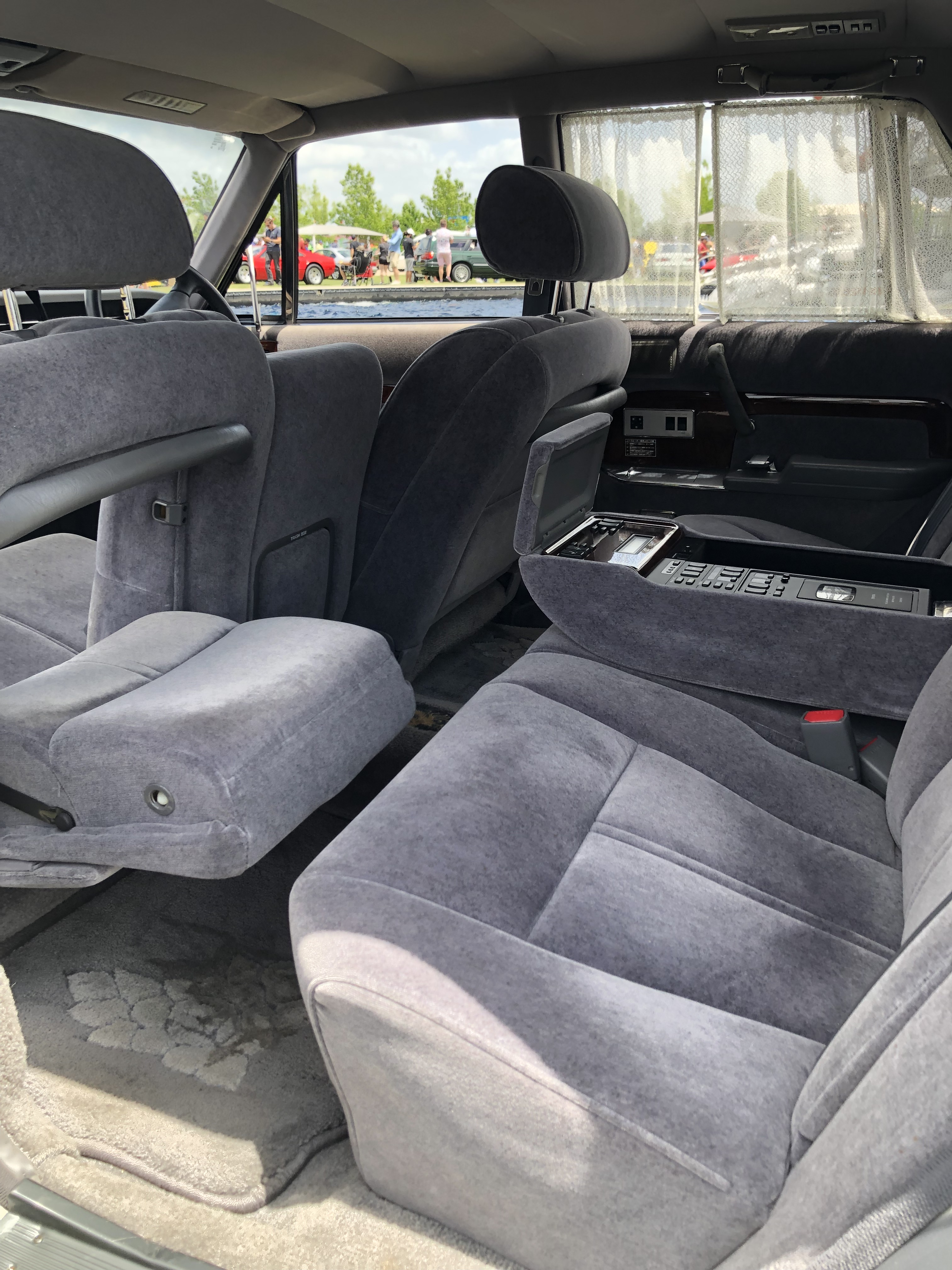
Rear passenger area (VG40) with the wool interior

== Second generation (G50; 1997) ==
Second generation
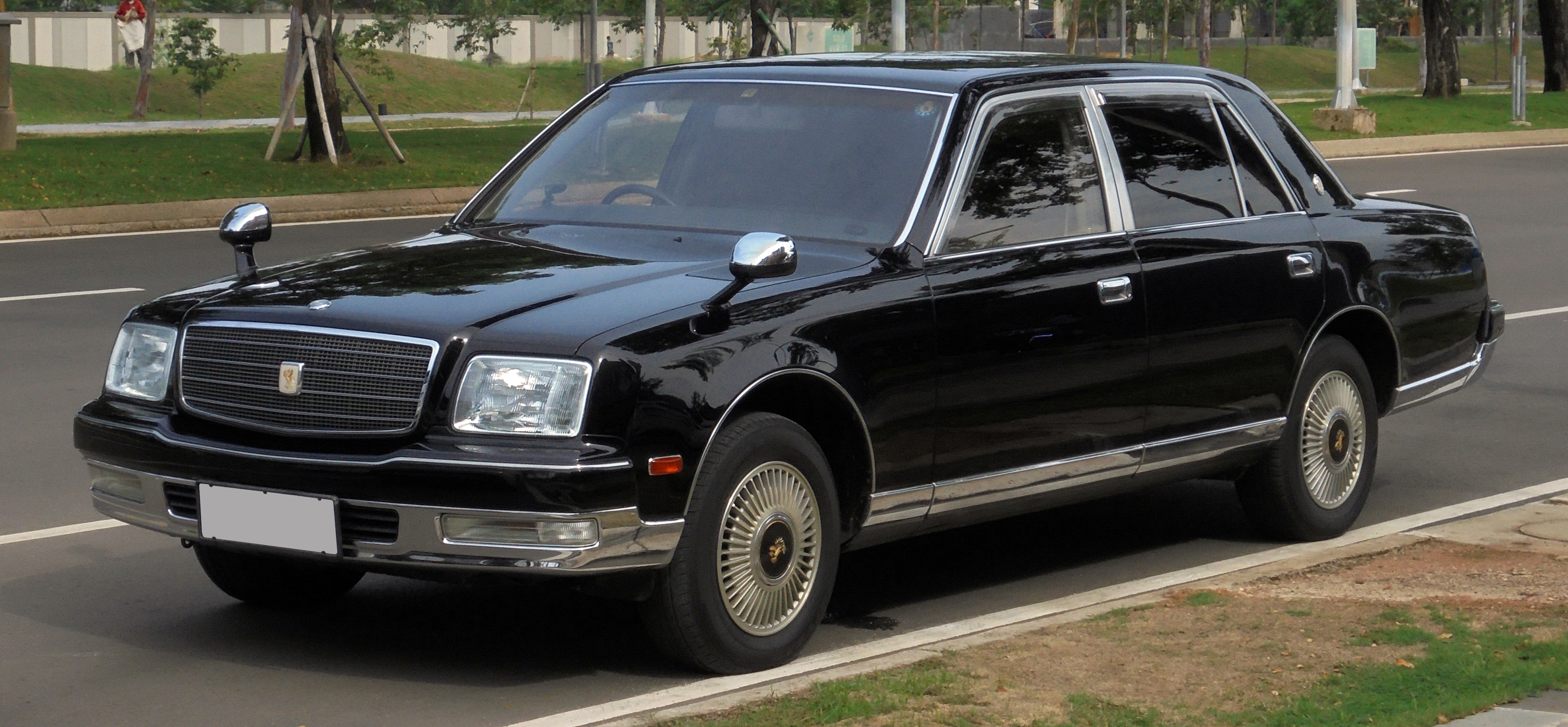

Overview
- Model code: G50
- Production: April 1997 – January 2017
- Assembly: Japan: Susono, Shizuoka (Toyota Motor East Japan)
- Designer: Akira Shimizu

Powertrain
- Engine: Petrol: 4996 cc 1GZ-FE V12 (GZG50); 4996 cc 1GZ-FNE CNG V12 (GZG50)
- Power output: 206 kW (280 PS; 276 hp) (Japan); 220 kW (299 PS; 295 hp) (export)
- Transmission: 4-speed A342E automatic (1997–2004); 6-speed automatic (2005–2016)

Dimensions
- Wheelbase: 3,025 mm (119.1 in)
- Length: 5,270 mm (207.5 in)
- Width: 1,890 mm (74.4 in)
- Height: 1,475 mm (58.1 in)
- Curb weight: 2,050 kg (4,519 lb)

The Century received a complete redesign in April 1997, although the new model contained similar design cues to the previous generation. This model is powered by a 5.0 L 1GZ-FE V12, rated at 206 kW (276 hp; 280 PS) in Japanese models and 220 kW (295 hp; 299 PS) at 5200 rpm in export models. Torque was rated at 460 N⋅m (339 lbf⋅ft) at 4000 rpm for both Japanese and export versions. It was initially equipped with a 4-speed A342E automatic, until a 6-speed "intelligent" transmission arrived in 2005. The suspension was upgraded to double wishbone control arms for the front and rear wheels with airbag support springs. The Century remains the first and only Japanese front-engine, rear-wheel-drive production car equipped with a V12, and it has Toyota's first V12 engine.

This generation no longer offered a selection of level of equipment preferred, and has either a floor-mounted or column-mounted transmission selector. From 2003 through 2004, the V12 engine was briefly offered with the ability to use CNG fuel.

Toyota began limited official exports of the G50 Century to Europe and Asian markets including China and the Middle East in November 1998, positioning it as an executive car for company and government officials. About 100 left-hand drive cars were produced for export, with some going to the United States for promotional and testing purposes. Several were in use as corporate cars for Toyota's North American executives. As of 2023, the G50 remains the only generation of the Century sedan to have officially been exported and sold outside of Japan.

The Century was Toyota's most luxurious model at its inception in 1967, and maintained this status throughout the 20th century. In its day, it was positioned above the Lexus line-up, and was the most luxurious and prestigious Toyota. In contrast to other luxurious cars (such as those from Maybach or Rolls-Royce), the Century has not been positioned and marketed as a sign of wealth or excess. Marketing literature states roughly that, "the Century is acquired through persistent work, the kind that is done in a plain but formal suit."

Like other cars in the top of the luxury class, the Century is designed with the rear passengers in mind. Hence, the rear seats recline and the front passenger seat (in right-hand drive cars only) has a fold-down centre section so that a passenger in the back may stretch their feet forward. The rear seats are equipped with a massage system. The doors are equipped with a soft-close mechanism, allowing the door to pull itself completely closed electrically when the latch makes contact with the striker.

The Century was priced at ¥11,445,000 – approximately US$100,000 (equivalent to $150,070 in 2025). In comparison, the base price for the full-size luxury 2008 Lexus LS 460 is approximately ¥10,000,000 (US$87,000 (equivalent to $130,097 in 2025)), with the LS 600h L at ¥15,000,000 (US$125,800 (equivalent to $188,117 in 2025)).

The second generation Century was discontinued on 4 February 2017, after almost 20 years of production. 9,573 vehicles were built from 1996 (the launch year was 1997) to the final figure of 100 cars in 2016.

Second generation (G50)

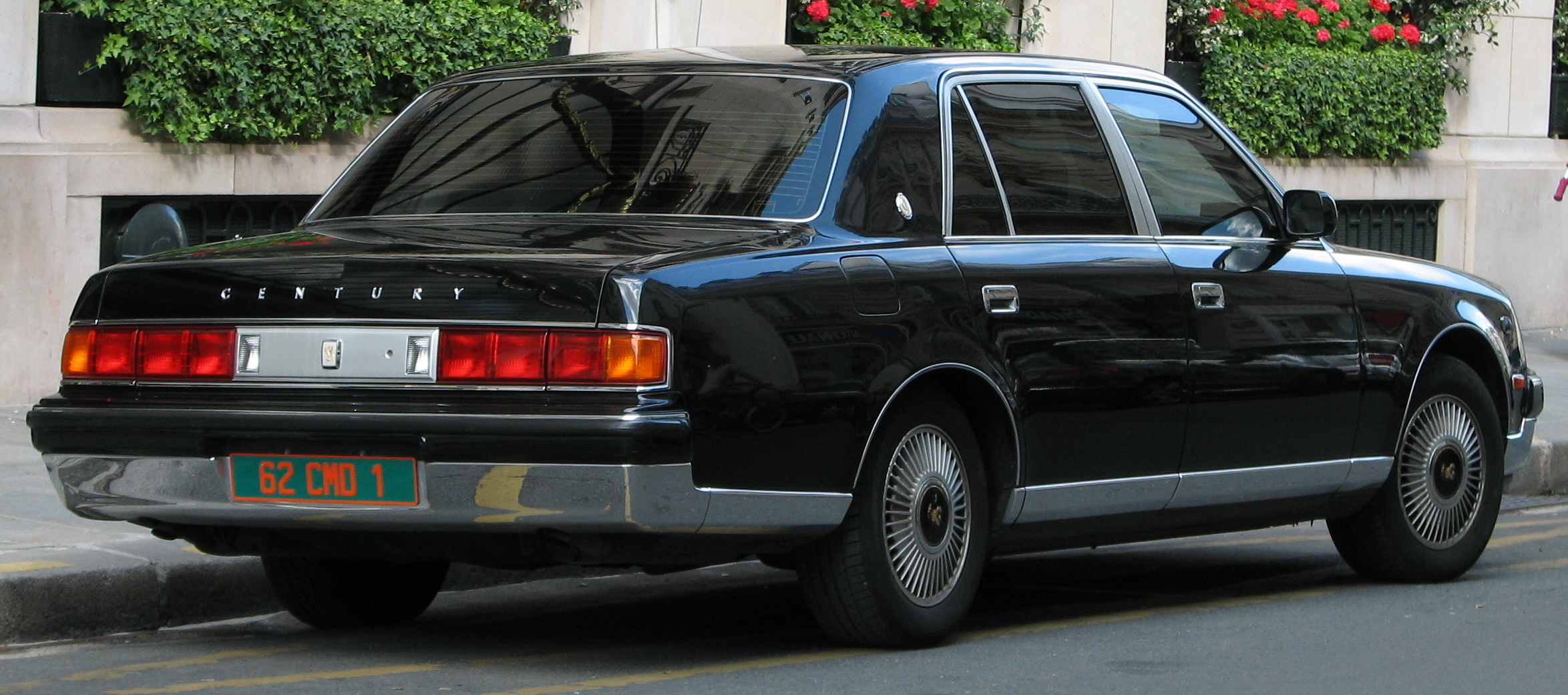
Century rear

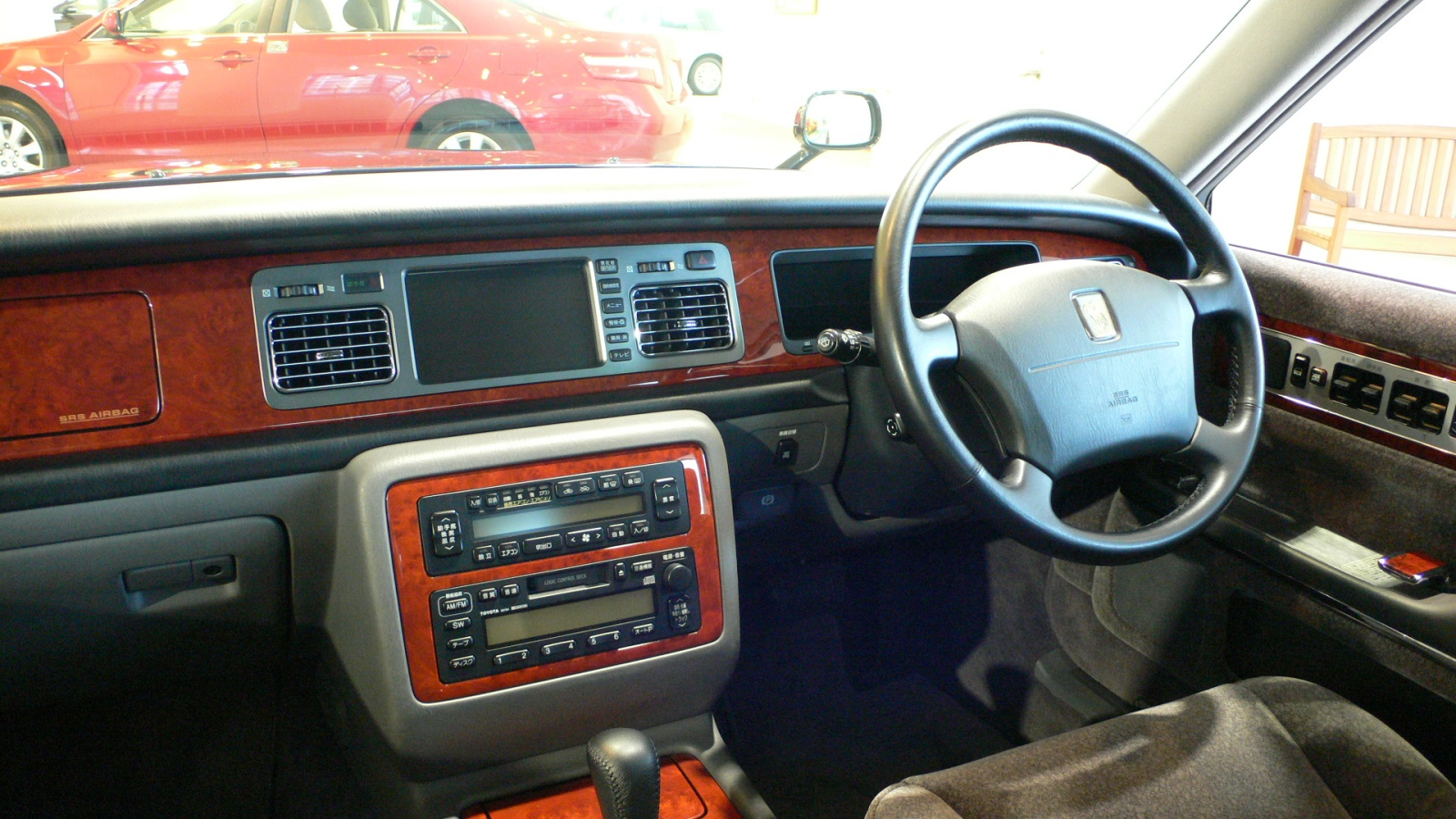
1997 Century driver's seat. The steering wheel design was adopted for various Toyota models throughout the 2000s.

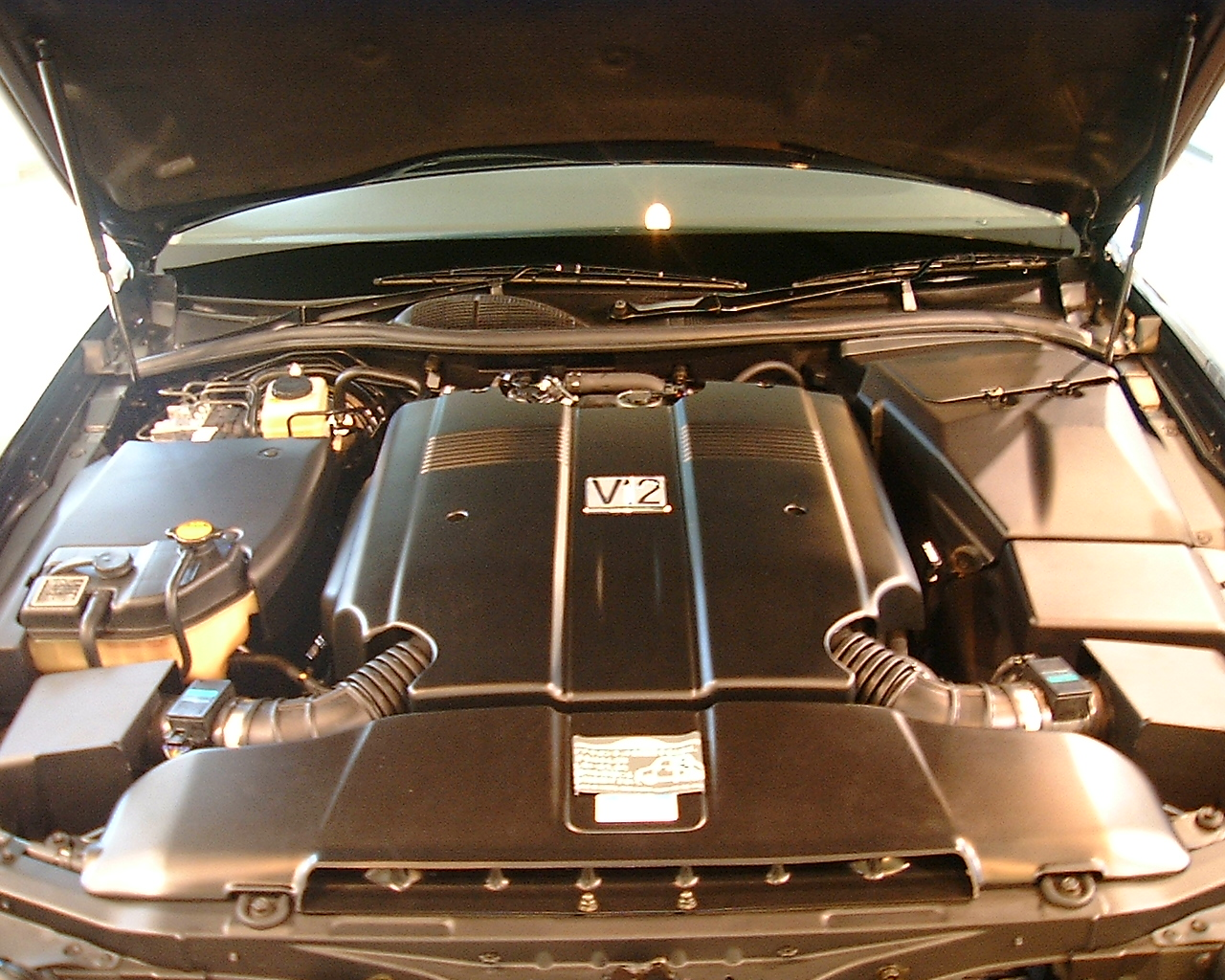
1GZ-FE V12

=== Century Royal (G51; 2006) ===
Toyota Century Royal
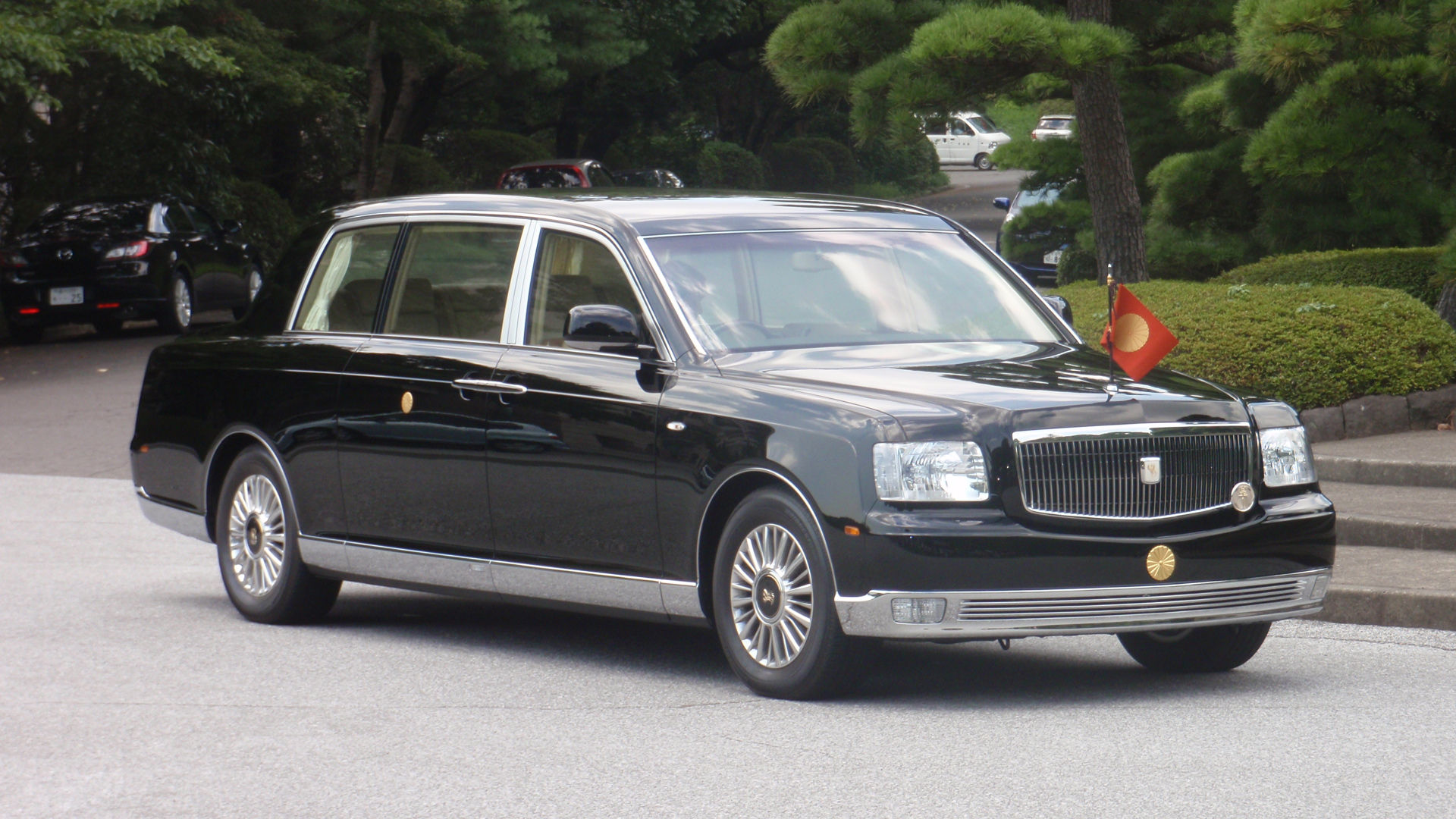
- Imperial 1

Overview
- Model code: G51
- Production: 2006–2008; 3 sedans; 1 hearse

Powertrain
- Engine: Petrol: 4996 cc 1GZ-FE V12 (GZG51)
- Transmission: 6-speed automatic (6 Super ECT)

Dimensions
- Wheelbase: 3,510 mm (138 in)
- Length: 6,155 mm (242.3 in)
- Width: 2,050 mm (81 in)
- Height: 1,770 mm (70 in)
- Curb weight: 2,920 kg (6,440 lb)

The Century Royal is the official state car currently used by the Emperor of Japan, being a specially prepared Century, a one-off ¥52,500,000 (US$500,000) custom car. This special version has wool cloth upholstery, internal granite entry steps and Japanese washi paper headlining for the passenger compartment, as well as undisclosed security measures. The front passenger compartment is upholstered in leather.

The suspension consists of double wishbones for both the front and rear wheels, supplemented by air-bag support springs. The engine used is the 5.0 L-V12 shared with the standard Century with power rated at 280 PS (206 kW; 276 bhp) and 460 N⋅m (339 lbf⋅ft) of torque at 4000 rpm. For various state functions, additional conventional Century sedans are used with a designated "Imperial" number roundel.

The limousine stretches around 20 feet in length and 6.5 feet across.

=== Chassis codes ===
- GZG50: 5.0 L 1GZ-FE V12
- GZG50L: 5.0 L 1GZ-FE V12 (LHD export)
- GZG50R: 5.0 L 1GZ-FE V12 (RHD export)
- GZG51: 5.0 L 1GZ-FE V12 (Century Royal)

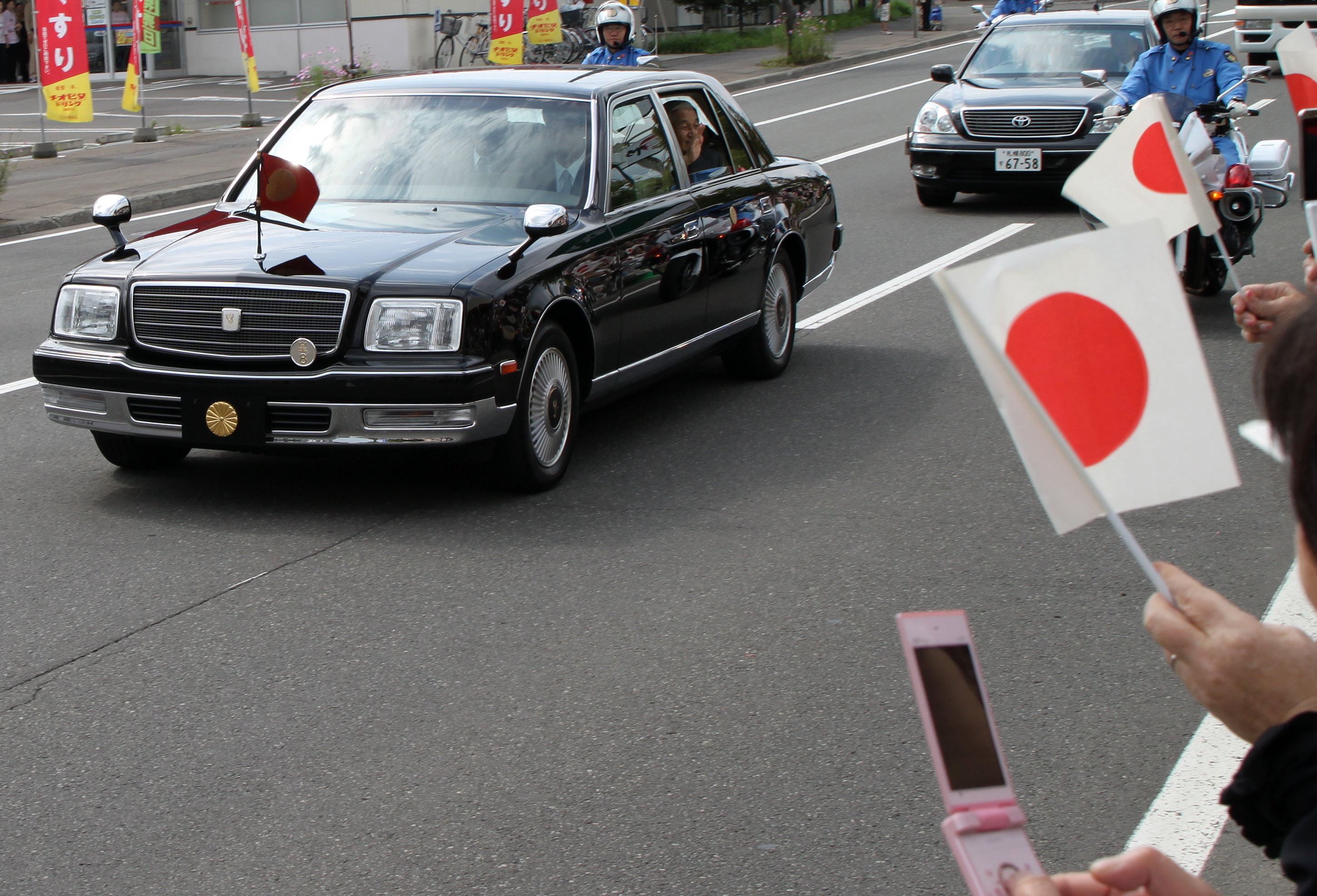
The Emperor Emeritus in a conventional Century, labeled Imperial 8

== Third generation (G60; 2018) ==
Third generation
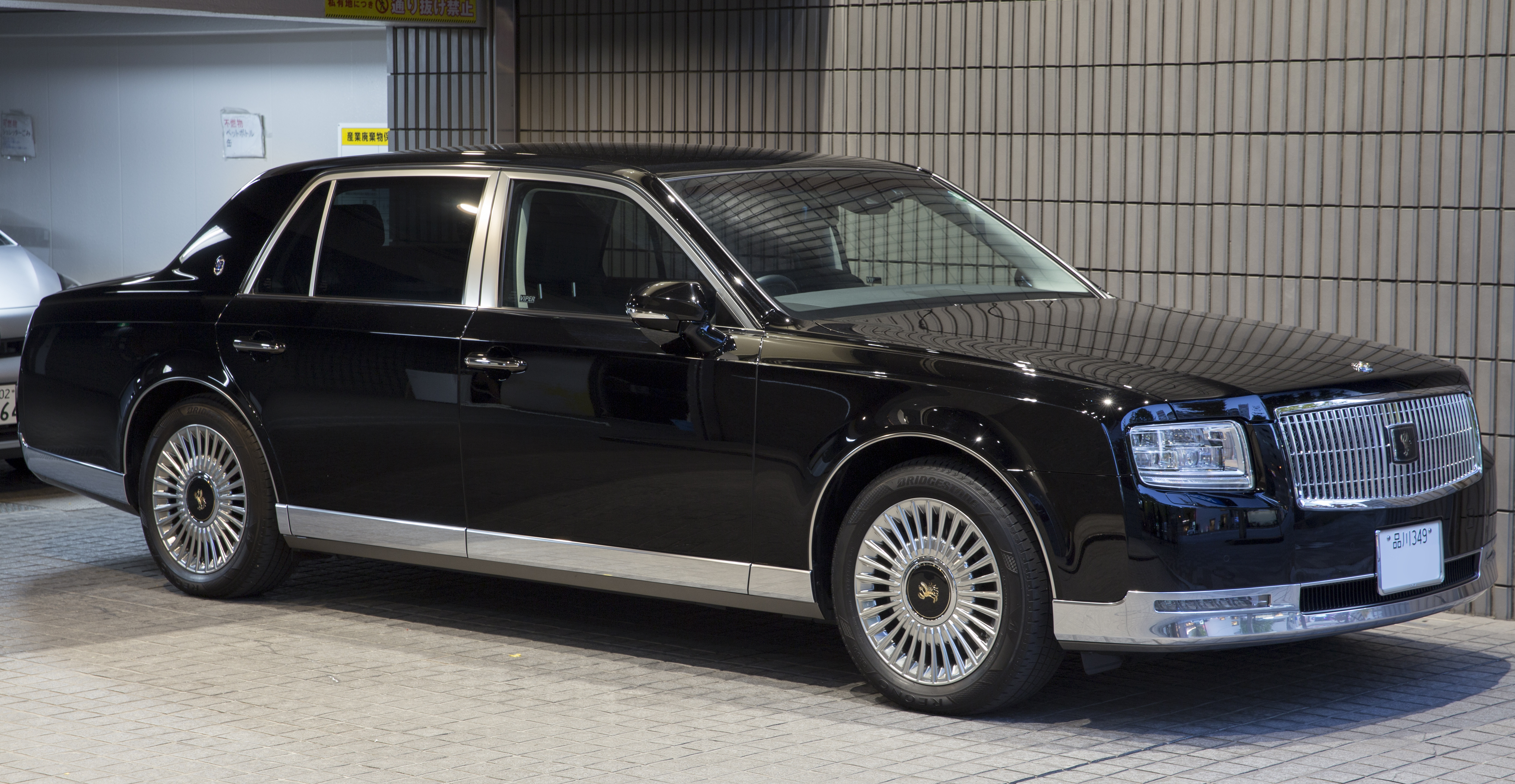

Overview
- Model code: G60
- Production: June 2018 – present
- Assembly: Japan: Susono, Shizuoka (Toyota Motor East Japan); Toyota City (Motomachi plant; from 2020)
- Designer: Masato Tanabe

Body and chassis
- Body style: 4-door limousine; 4-door convertible (Royal Parade Car)
- Platform: Toyota N platform
- Related: Lexus LS 600h L (UVF46)

Powertrain
- Engine: Petrol hybrid: 4968 cc 2UR-FSE V8 (UWG60)
- Electric motor: 165 kW (221 hp; 224 PS) 1KM AC synchronous
- Power output: 280 kW (375 hp; 381 PS) (petrol engine); 317 kW (425 hp; 431 PS) (combined system output)
- Transmission: eCVT
- Hybrid drivetrain: Power-split (THS II)

Dimensions
- Wheelbase: 3,090 mm (121.7 in)
- Length: 5,335 mm (210.0 in)
- Width: 1,930 mm (76.0 in)
- Height: 1,505 mm (59.3 in)
- Curb weight: 2,370 kg (5,225 lb)

The third generation Century was unveiled at the October 2017 Tokyo Motor Show. The car then went on sale on 22 June 2018, with prices starting from ¥19,600,000 (approximately US$180,000 at June 2018 exchange rates) to the top grade Century Limousine at ¥60,000,000. The Century's production is limited to 50 per month, and it is built in a "nearly hand-made" fashion. Unlike the previous generation, the G60 Century is no longer available outside of the Japanese market due to the G50's failure to sell overseas.

It shows that its appearance was influenced by the Century Royal, which was produced at the request of the Japanese Imperial Household Agency to be used by senior members of the Imperial House of Japan in 2006. The full model update maintains the visual tradition of the Century model, while incorporating appropriate technological upgrades and advances such as Toyota Safety Sense P-series collision avoidance support, and Toyota T-Connect. The traditionally installed side-view mirrors above the front wheels, a standard feature that started with the first generation, have been replaced with door mounted units, incorporating turn signal lights.

The GRMN version was unveiled on public roads in September 2018. The exterior features a white body with aerodynamic parts and aluminium wheels. The car appears to have been lowered slightly. The front end has been slightly redesigned, and the GRMN badge. 2 Century GRMN's was produced. The white version was introduced as the headquarters car or chairman's car at the 95th Hakone Ekiden in 2019. The black version was exhibited at the 2019 Tokyo Auto Salon. However, there are no plans for a commercial release, nor have the specifications been revealed.

A special order, the Convertible was used for the coronation of the Emperor Naruhito on 10 November 2019. Modifications include the removal of the roof and cutting of the C-pillars, the installation of white leather seats, a slightly raised rear seat with the backrest angle fixed at 25 degrees.

From 2020 until June 2026, a G60 Toyota Century (third generation) model has been used by the Prime Minister alongside the older Lexus LS.

As with previous generations, rear passenger comfort and convenience is made a priority. The rear seats have a recline feature, with integrated heaters and massage function, as well as an adjustable power leg rest for the rear seat opposite the driver. The sound system comes standard with 20 speakers. A 20-inch LCD screen is installed for rear seat passengers that let occupants control many aspects and features as a convenience as well as playing video content. The standard upholstery fabric continues to be offered in three colour choices using 100% wool with a unique heather pattern, with leather remaining available optionally in two different colour combinations. Both upholstery choices include two different wood inlay selections. The transmission selector, which on previous generations was either floor mounted or steering column installed, is now only available on the floor.

The powertrain is Hybrid Synergy Drive including the 2UR-FSE 5.0-litre V8 petrol engine, producing 317 kW (431 PS; 425 hp). It maintains the displacement of the prior V12 engine but adding an electric drive system for fuel economy improvement to 13.6 km/L (7.4 L/100 km; 38 mpg_{‑imp}; 32 mpg_{‑US}), compared to the prior generation's 10 km/L (10 L/100 km; 28 mpg_{‑imp}; 24 mpg_{‑US}). The powertrain package is the same as the 2008-2017 Lexus LS 600h & LS 600h L; however, as the fifth-generation LS does not feature this powertrain, it is now unique to the Century. The suspension has been upgraded from the previous double wishbone to a multi-link suspension with supplemental air bags to further enhance ride quality. Toyota first displayed a hybrid engine in the Century at the 1975 Tokyo Motor Show in the Century gas turbine hybrid, with a GT45 gas turbine and electric motor.

=== Chassis codes ===
- UWG60: 5.0 L 2UR-FSE V8

=== Production transfer ===
From 1967 to 2020, the Century was assembled at the Higashi-Fuji plant (Susono, Shizuoka) owned by Kanto Auto Works and its successor Toyota Motor East Japan. On 10 December 2020, Toyota Motor East Japan ceased car production at Higashi-Fuji and Toyota moved the Century assembly operations to Toyota City's Motomachi plant.

Third generation (G60)

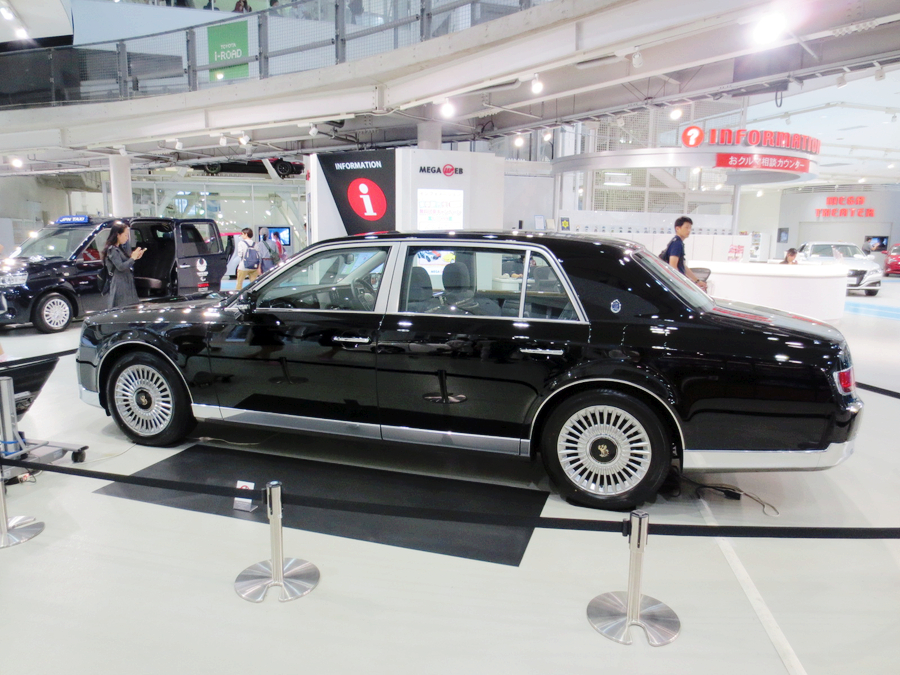
Century side

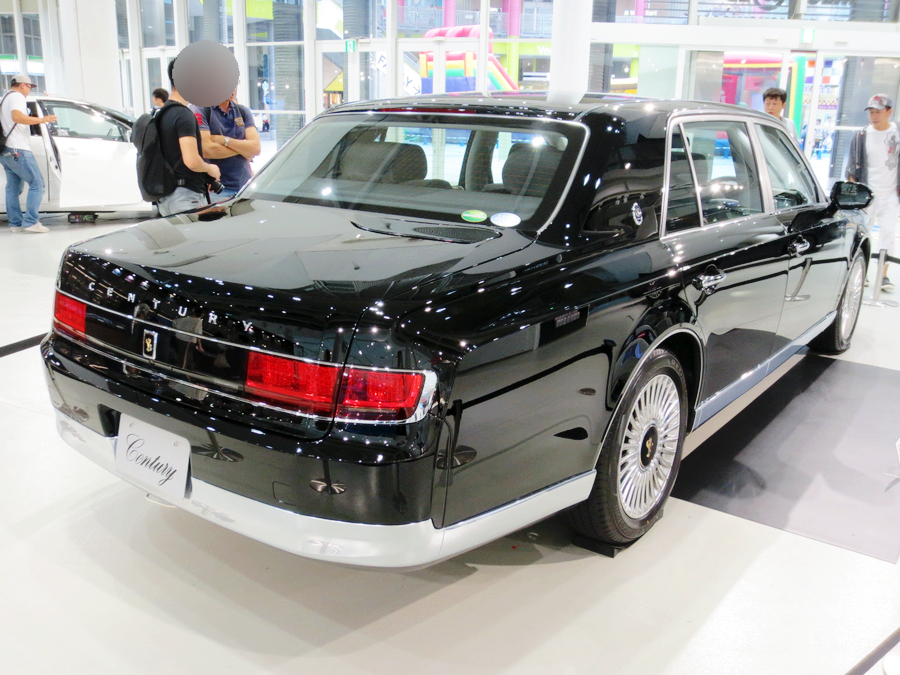
Century rear

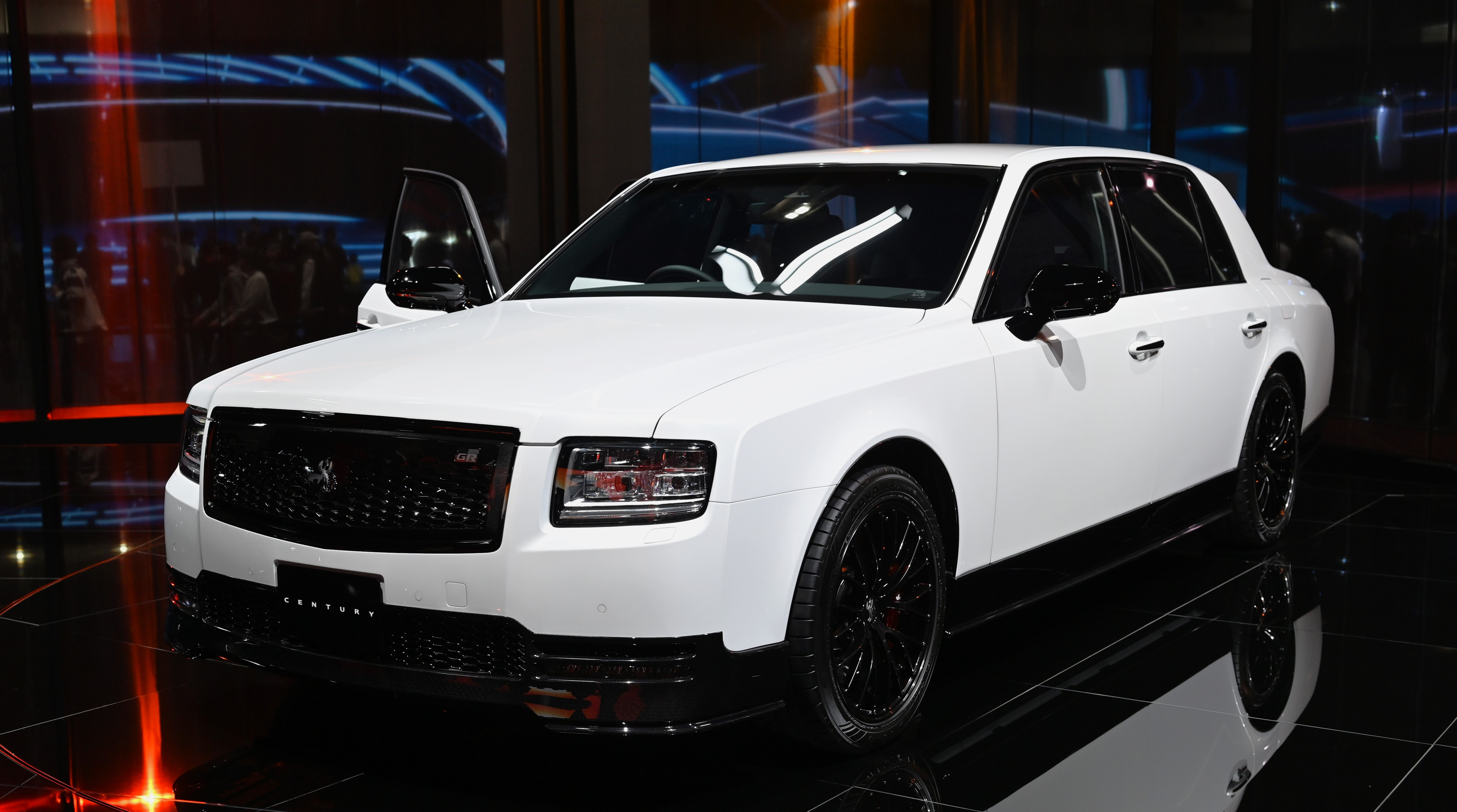
Century GRMN

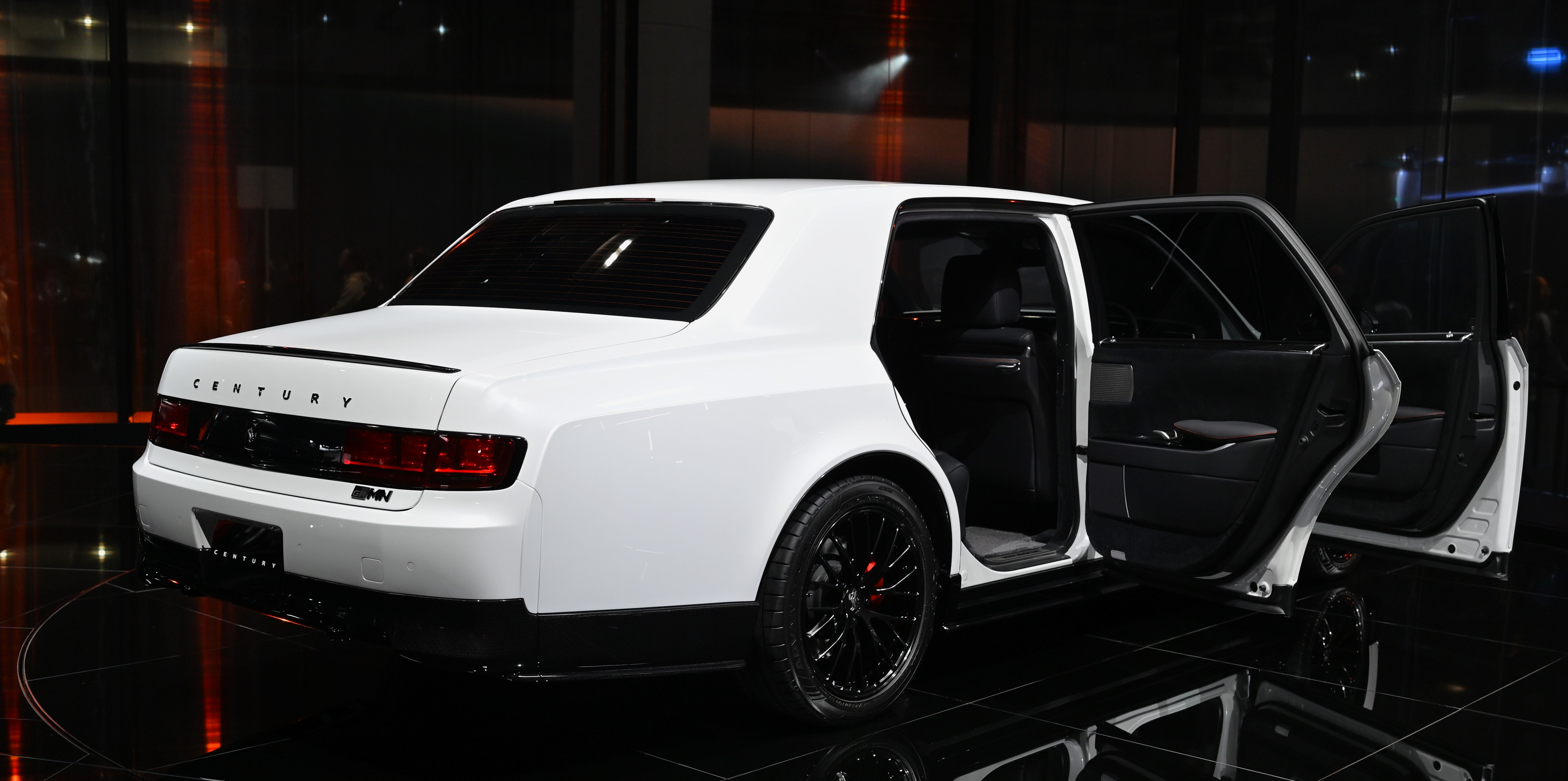
Century GRMN rear

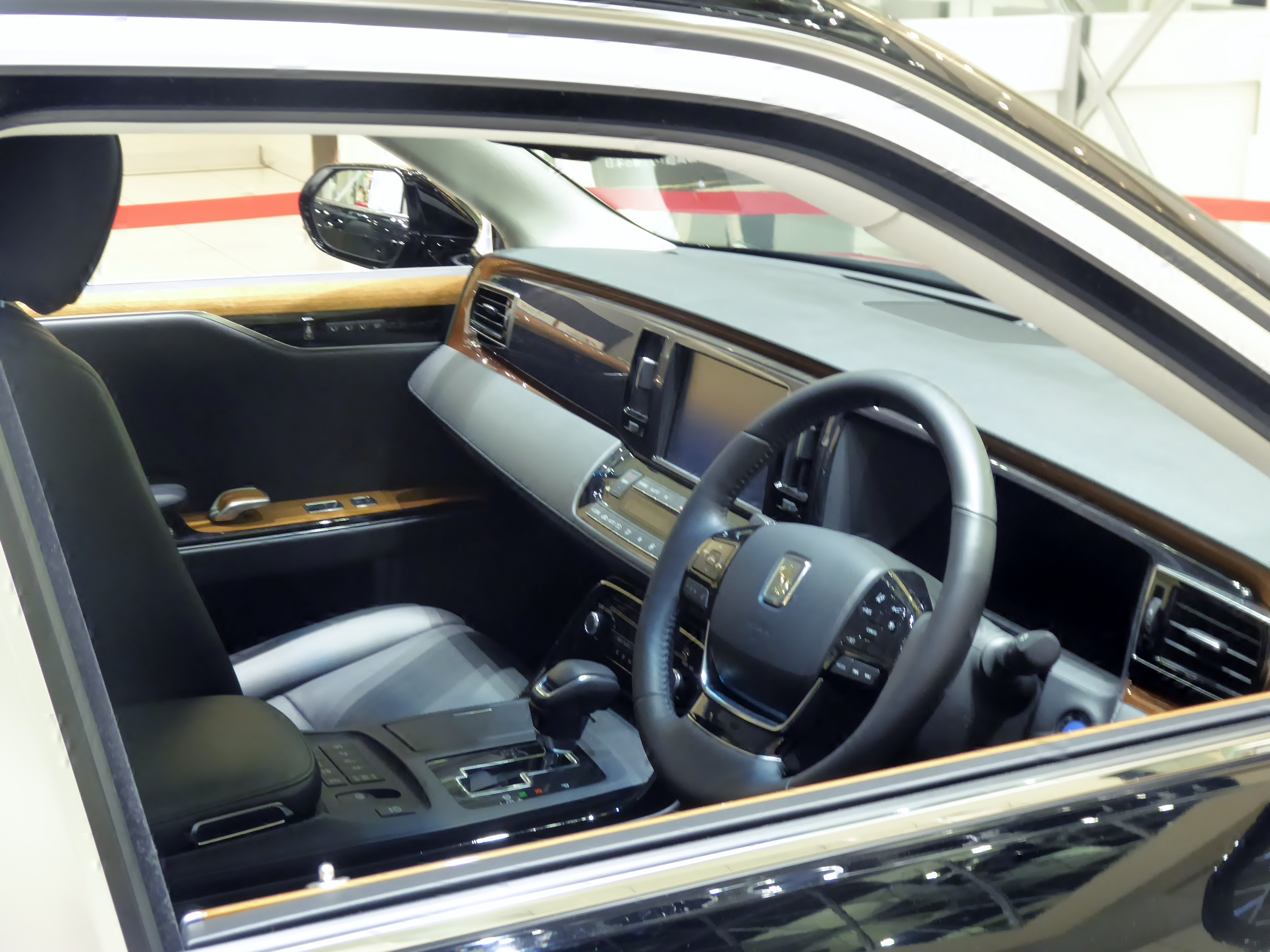
Century interior

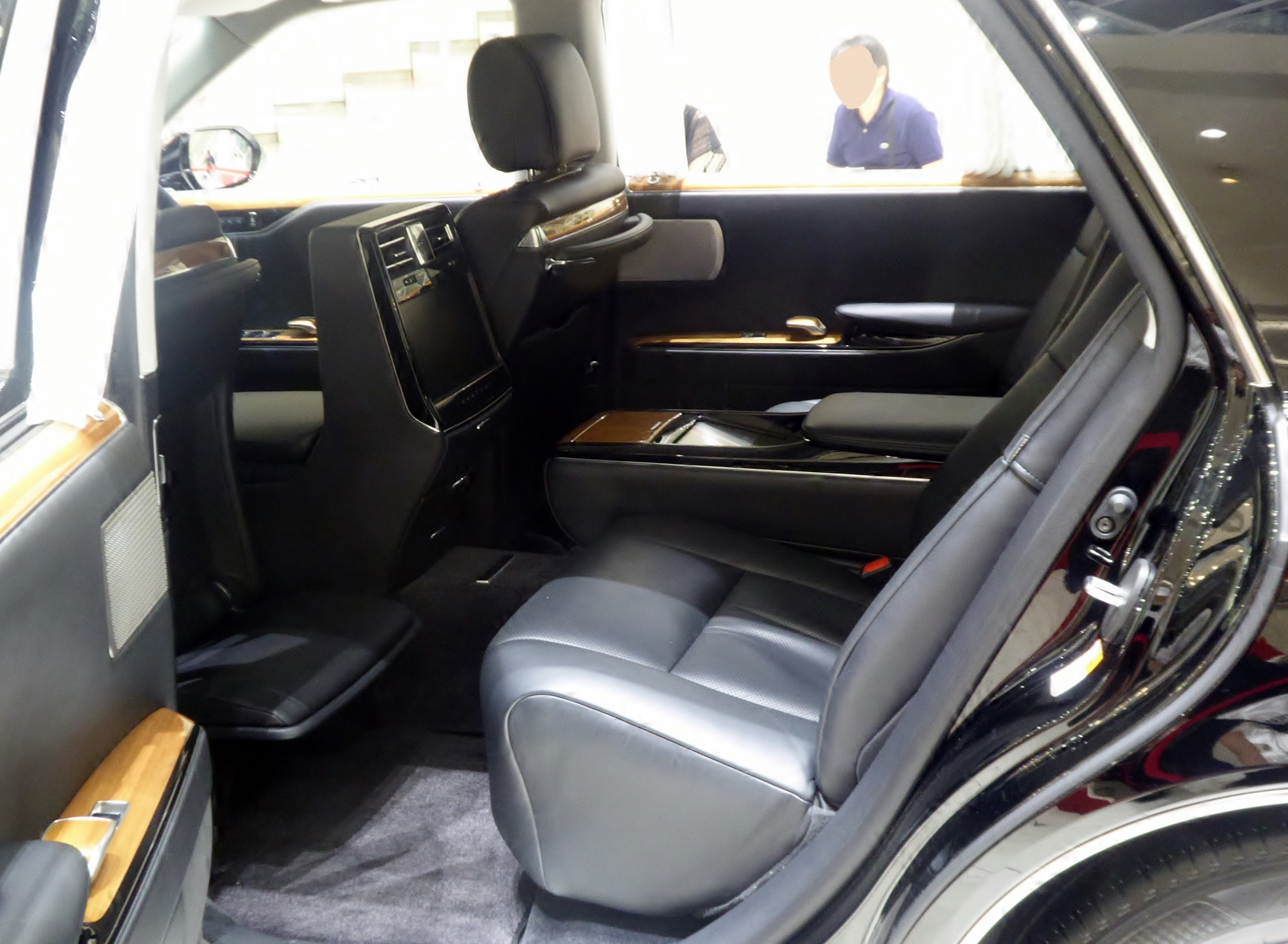
Century rear passenger area

== Century SUV (G70; 2023) ==
SUV
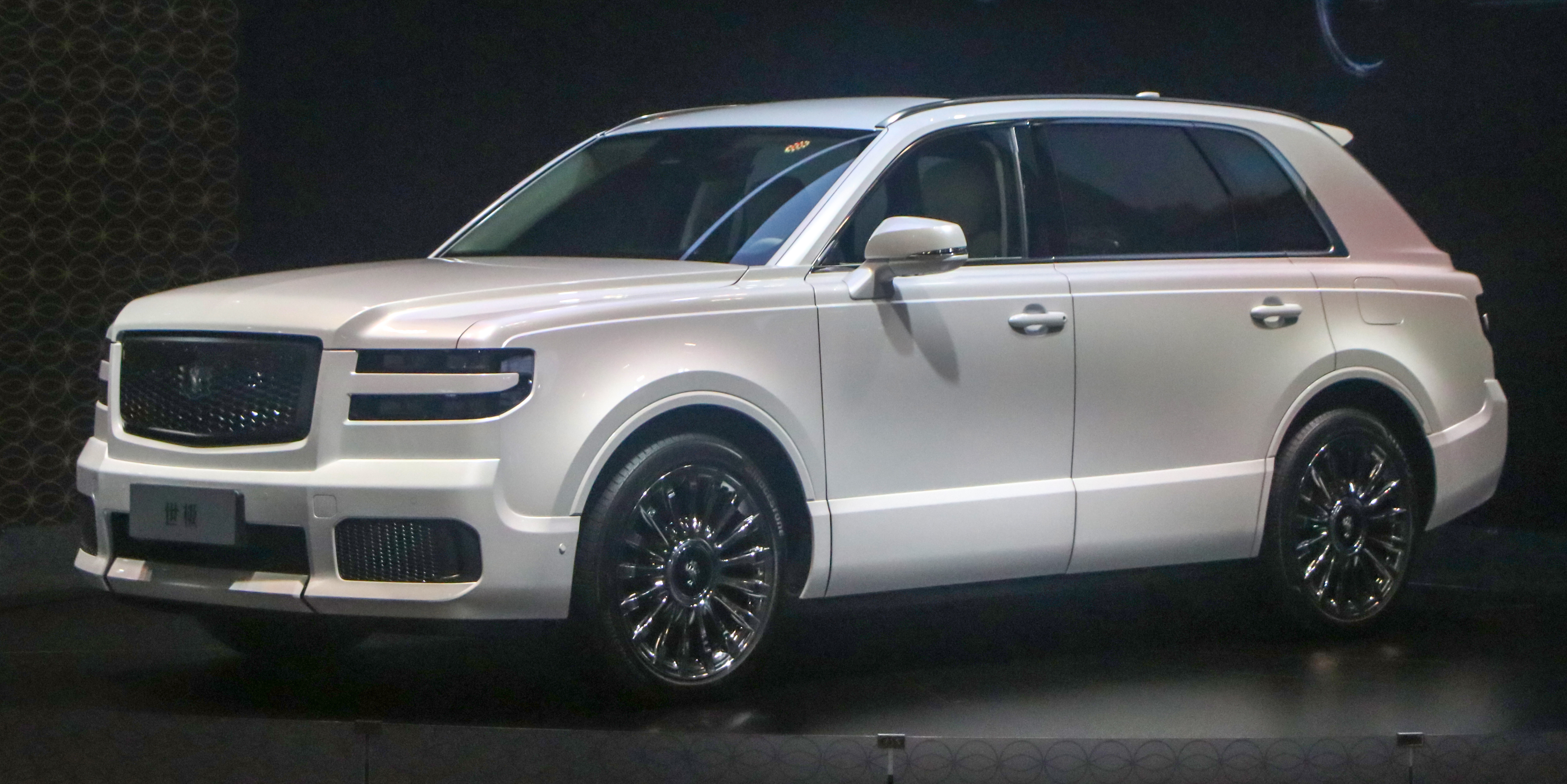
- Century SUV (GRG75, China)

Overview
- Model code: G70
- Production: September 2023 – present
- Assembly: Japan: Tahara, Aichi (Tahara plant)
- Designer: Ryota Nakai, Shota Asano and Soto Shirouzu (exterior); Shin Numoto, Takaaki Katou and Yutaro Yamamoto (interior)

Body and chassis
- Class: Full-size luxury crossover SUV
- Body style: 5-door SUV
- Layout: Transverse front-engine, four-wheel-drive (E-Four Advanced)
- Platform: TNGA: GA-K
- Related: Toyota Grand Highlander; Lexus TX

Powertrain
- Engine: Petrol plug-in hybrid: 3.5 L 2GR-FXS V6 (GRG75)
- Electric motor: 5NM AC synchronous (front); 1NM AC synchronous (rear)
- Power output: 193 kW (259 hp; 262 PS) (2GR-FXS engine); 134 kW (180 hp; 182 PS) (5NM motor); 80 kW (107 hp; 109 PS) (1NM motor); 303 kW (406 hp; 412 PS) (combined system output)
- Transmission: eCVT
- Hybrid drivetrain: Plug-in
- Battery: 51-Ah lithium-ion
- Electric range: 69 km (43 mi)

Dimensions
- Wheelbase: 2,950 mm (116.1 in)
- Length: 5,205 mm (204.9 in)
- Width: 1,990 mm (78.3 in)
- Height: 1,805 mm (71.1 in)
- Kerb weight: 2,570 kg (5,666 lb)

The Century-badged SUV model was unveiled on 6 September 2023. It is built on the front-wheel drive-based GA-K platform shared with the North American market Grand Highlander and the Lexus TX. A 3.5-litre 2GR-FXS V6 engine with plug-in hybrid drivetrain is standard, producing 303 kW (412 PS; 406 hp). Development was led by Yoshikazu Tanaka as chief engineer, along with Design Division General Manager Tatsuya Sonoda. It uses Toyota's E-four four-wheel drive system. In its marketing materials and official releases, Toyota avoided the 'SUV' label to the vehicle. The company described it simply as the "New Century", and according to Tanaka, a "new concept for chauffeur-driven mobility." He explained that the G70 Century adopts this body style to maximise backseat space.

In January 2024, Toyota unveiled a unique Century SUV convertible model during the Grand Sumo Tournament in Tokyo, designed to accompany athletes during Sumo competitions in Japan. The idea of this vehicle was proposed by former yokozuna Hakuhō, who has close relationships with Toyota's chairman Akio Toyoda. On 23 June 2025, the Century SUV received a dimming feature for rear passenger windows.

On 22 June 2026, The Japanese Prime Minister Takaichi replaced the previous Century G60 sedan with a Century G70 SUV.

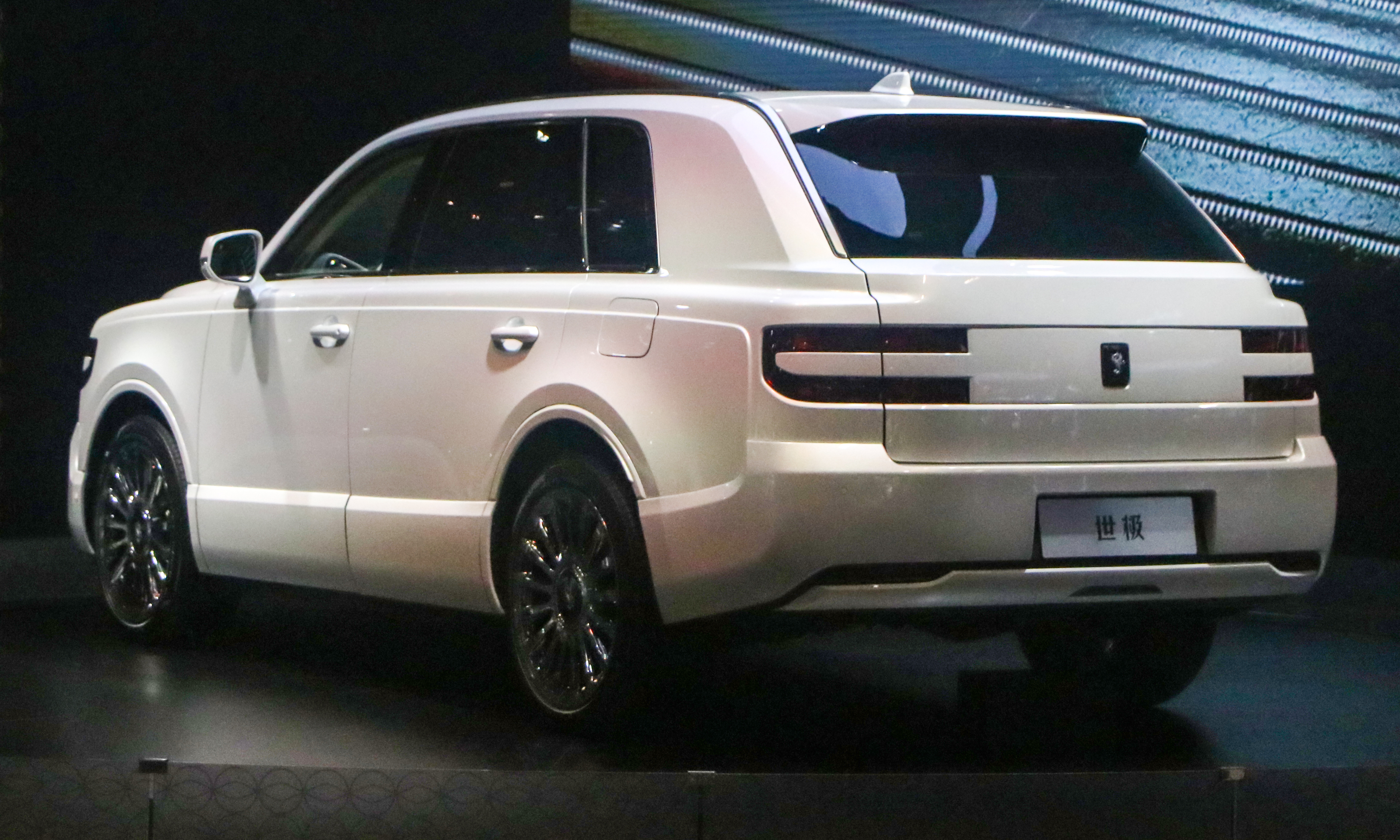
Rear view

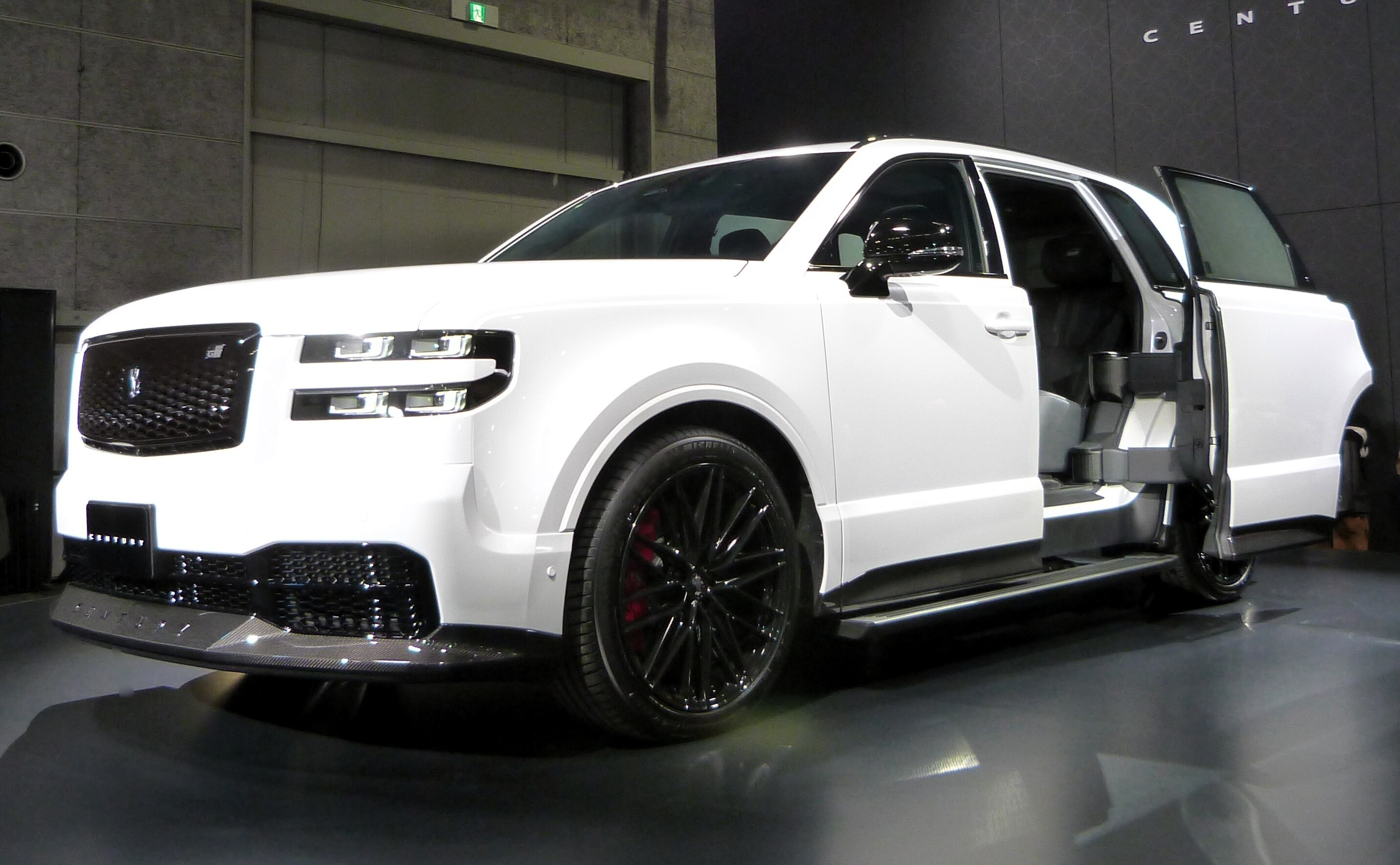
Century GRMN SUV

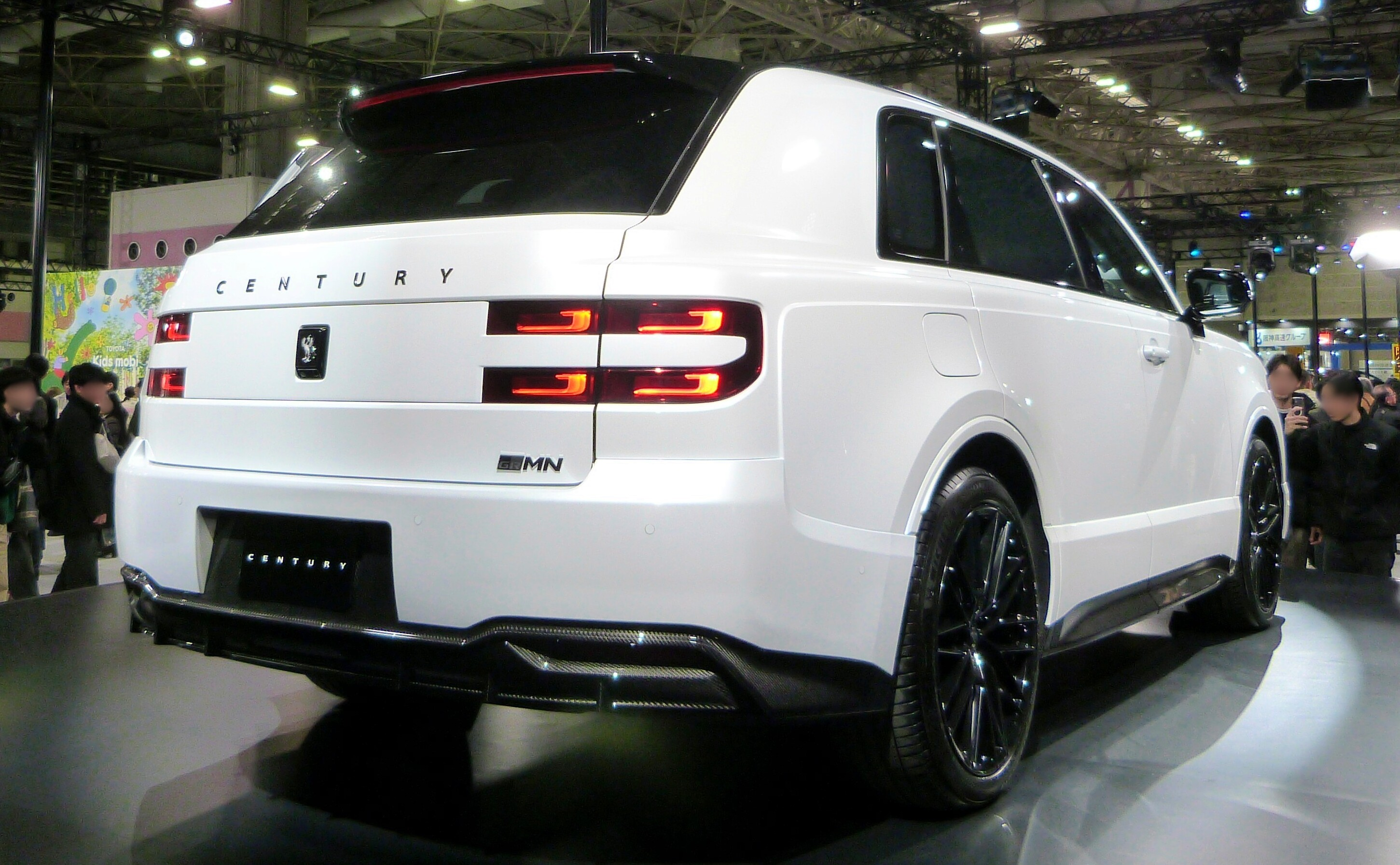
Century GRMN SUV rear

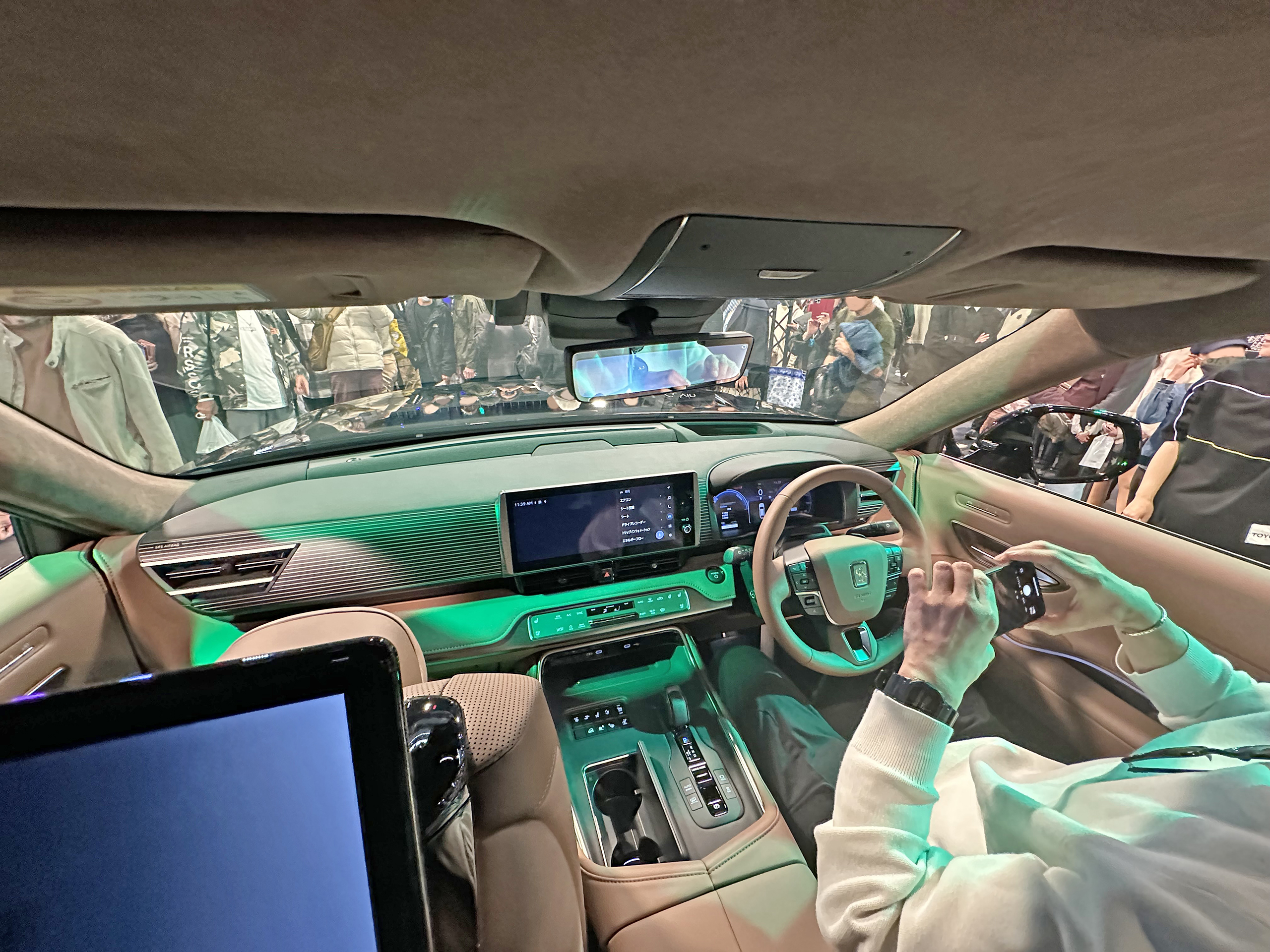
Interior

=== Markets ===
==== Japan ====
The Century SUV launched in Japan on 6 September 2023, with orders beginning the same day. In Japan, the SUV is sold alongside the G60 sedan at select Toyota dealerships employing specialized sales and service staff called "Century Meisters".

==== China ====
The Chinese-market version of the Century SUV was introduced at Auto Guangzhou 2023 on 17 November 2023. Slated to be sold through the Lexus dealer network as an imported model, it is the first Century model to officially be exported and sold outside of Japan with a left-hand drive configuration since the G50 sedan, which was discontinued in 2017.

=== Chassis codes ===
- GRG75: 3.5 L 2GR-FXS V6

== Century coupe concept (2025) ==
The Century nameplate was also used on a lifted coupe concept in 2025.

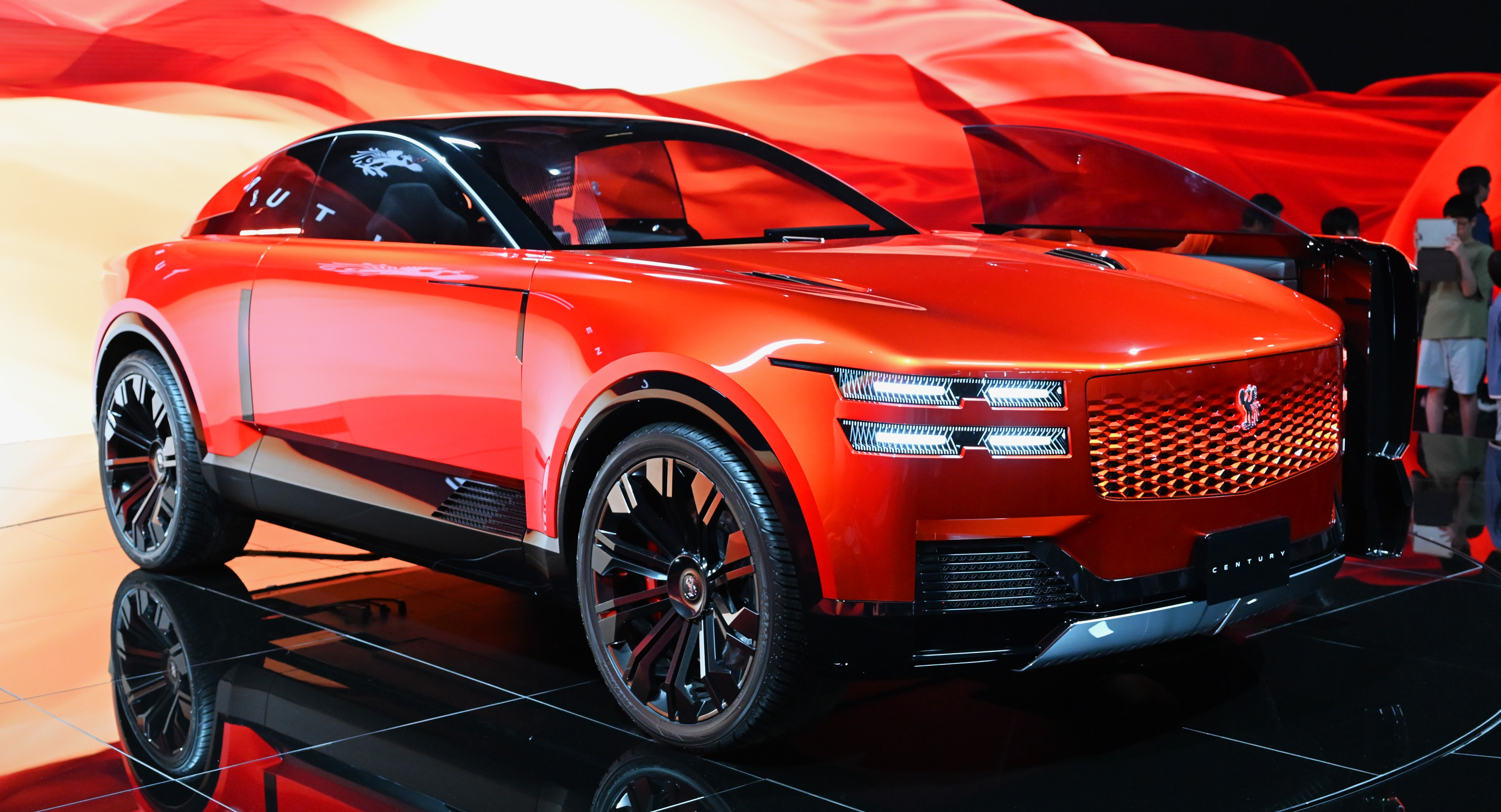
Century coupe front view

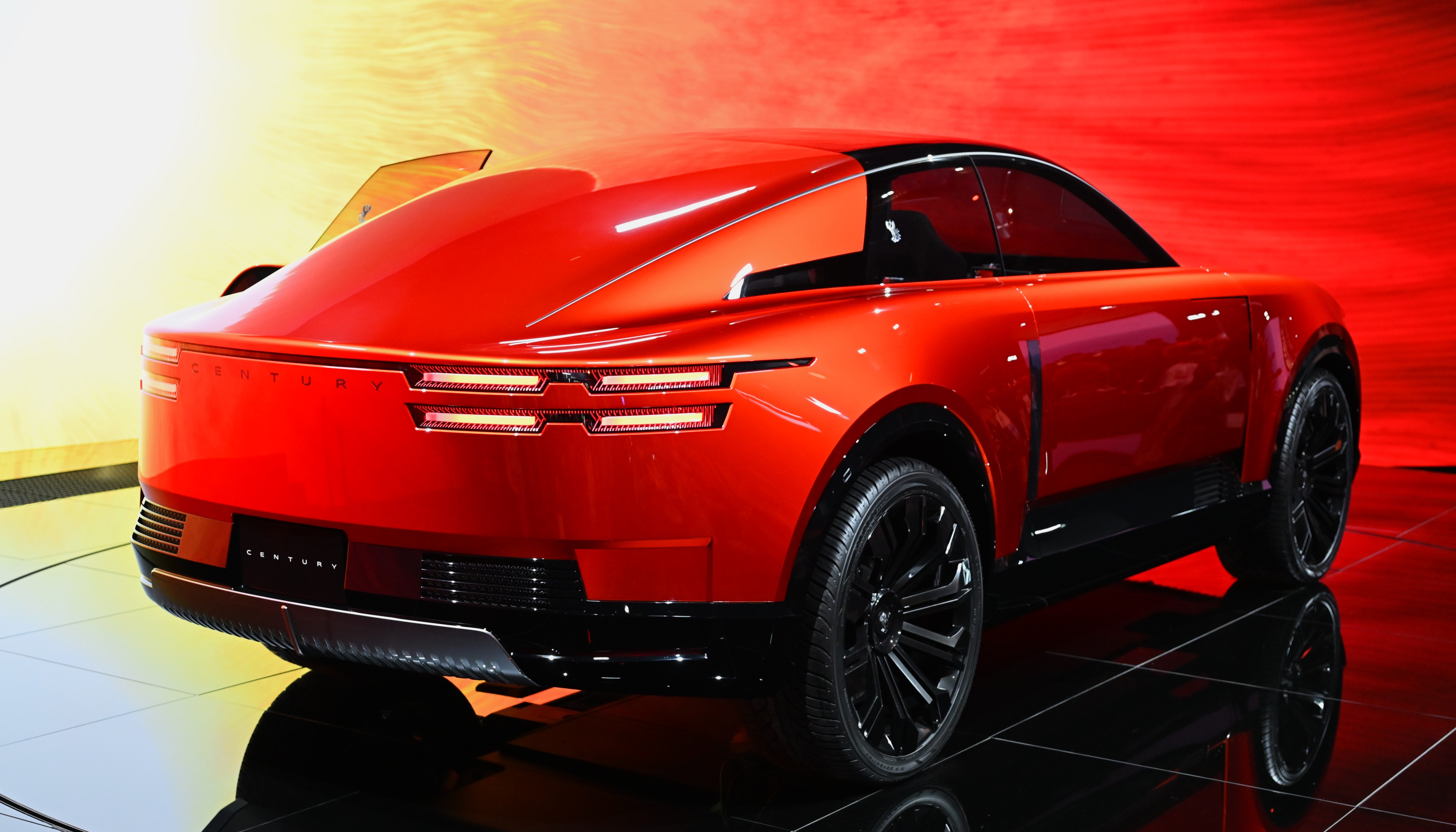
Century coupe rear view

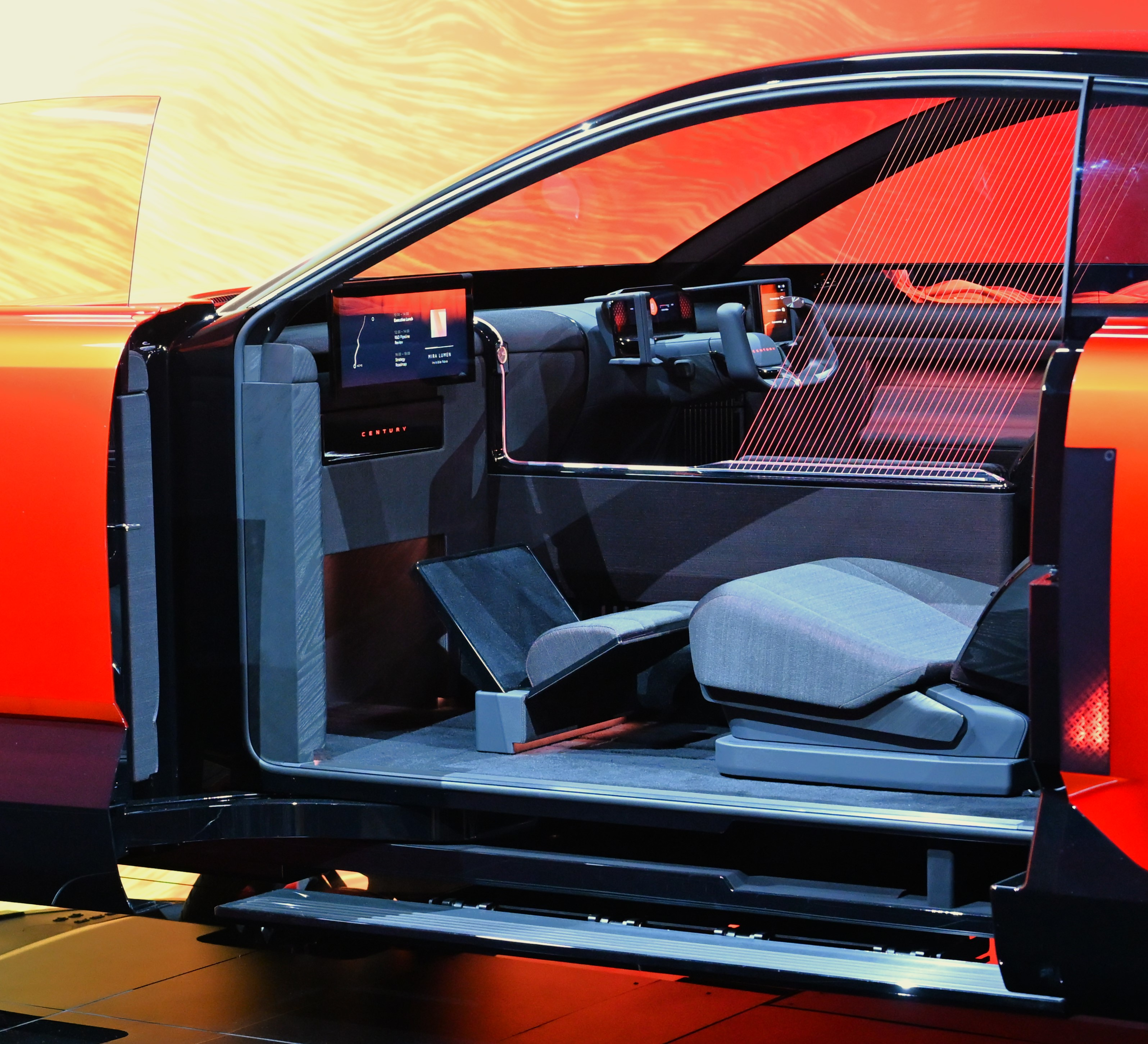
Century coupe interior

== See also ==
- Century (marque)
- Official state car
