= Toyota V engine =

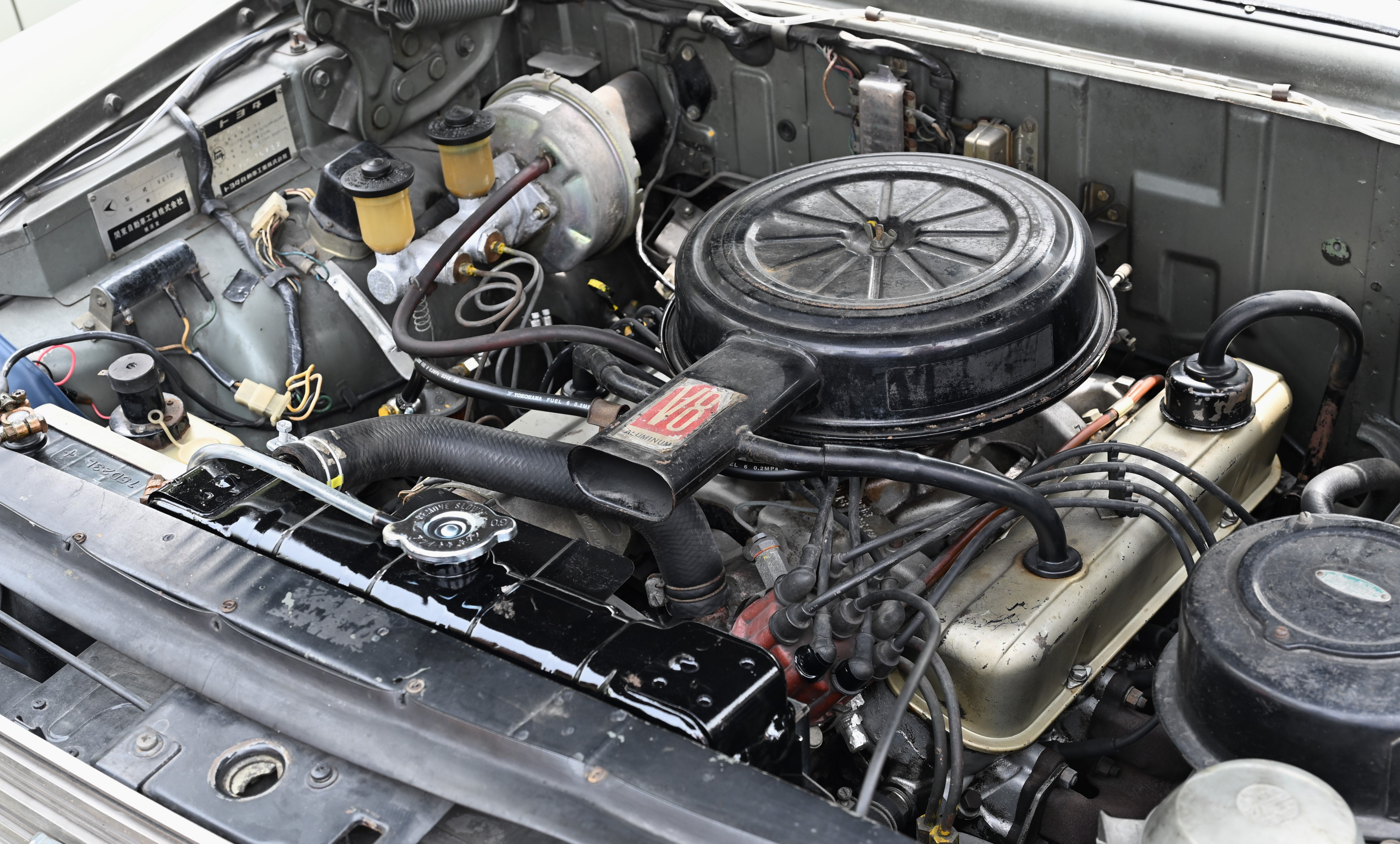
- Toyota 2.6 L V engine

Overview
- Manufacturer: Toyota
- Also called: "Toyota Hemi"
- Production: 1963–1997

Layout
- Configuration: Naturally aspirated 90° V8
- Displacement: 2,599 cc (2.6 L); 2,981 cc (3.0 L); 3,376 cc (3.4 L); 3,994 cc (4.0 L)
- Cylinder bore: 78 mm (3.1 in); 83 mm (3.27 in); 87 mm (3.43 in)
- Piston stroke: 68 mm (2.7 in); 78 mm (3.07 in); 84 mm (3.31 in)
- Cylinder block material: Aluminium Alloy
- Cylinder head material: Aluminium Alloy
- Valvetrain: OHV 2 valves per cyl.
- Valvetrain drive system: Timing belt
- Compression ratio: 8.5:1-9.8:1

Combustion
- Fuel system: Carburetor; Multi-port fuel injection
- Fuel type: Gasoline
- Oil system: Wet sump
- Cooling system: Water-cooled

Output
- Power output: 115–190 PS (113–187 hp; 85–140 kW)
- Torque output: 196–324 N⋅m (20–33 kg⋅m; 145–239 lb⋅ft)

Chronology
- Successor: Toyota UZ engine (V8); Toyota GZ engine (V12)

Toyota Motor Corporation's V family of engines were a longitudinally-mounted V8 engine design. They were used from the 1960s through 1997. The V family engine was used in the prestigious Toyota Century. Toyota had worked with Yamaha to produce the first Japanese full aluminum alloy block engine. The V family is often referred to as the "Toyota Hemi" as the engine features a cylinder head design with approximately hemispherical combustion chambers.

The V 2.6 L (2,599 cc) engine was first used in the Crown Eight from 1964 to 1967 as part of the second generation Crown range. Thereafter the Crown Eight was replaced by the upmarket Toyota Century.

The 3V, 4V and 5V engines were used in the Toyota Century up until 1997, when it got a complete redesign and replaced the V8 for the 5.0 L 1GZ-FE V12.

The V series engines, like several Toyota Motor Corporation engines (e.g. 2T-C, 2M, 4M etc.) at the time had a hemispherical combustion chamber. The position of the spark plugs, like the 2T-C and Chrysler's Hemi, were located on the top of the head.

Code	Capacity	Bore x stroke	Power	Torque	Compression	Years
V	2.6 L (2,599 cc)	78 mm × 68 mm (3.07 in × 2.68 in)	115 PS (85 kW) at 5000 rpm	196 N⋅m (145 lbf⋅ft) at 3000 rpm	9.0:1	1963—1967
3V	3.0 L (2,981 cc)	78 mm × 78 mm (3.07 in × 3.07 in)	150 PS (110 kW) at 5200 rpm	235 N⋅m (173 lbf⋅ft) at 3600 rpm	9.8:1	1967—1973
4V	3.4 L (3,376 cc)	83 mm × 78 mm (3.27 in × 3.07 in)	180 PS (132 kW) at 5400 rpm	278 N⋅m (205 lbf⋅ft) at 3600 rpm	8.5:1	1973—1975
4V-U	3.4 L (3,376 cc)	83 mm × 78 mm (3.27 in × 3.07 in)	170 PS (125 kW) at 5400 rpm	260 N⋅m (192 lbf⋅ft) at 3600 rpm	8.5:1	1975—1978
4V-EU	3.4 L (3,376 cc)	83 mm × 78 mm (3.27 in × 3.07 in)	180 PS (132 kW) at 5200 rpm	270 N⋅m (199 lbf⋅ft) at 4400 rpm	8.8:1	1978—1982
5V-EU	4.0 L (3,994 cc)	87 mm × 84 mm (3.43 in × 3.31 in)	190 PS (140 kW) at 4800 rpm	324 N⋅m (239 lbf⋅ft) at 3600 rpm	8.5:1	1983—199?
5V-EU	4.0 L (3,994 cc)	87 mm × 84 mm (3.43 in × 3.31 in)	165 PS (121 kW) at 4400 rpm	289 N⋅m (213 lbf⋅ft) at 3600 rpm	8.6:1	199?—1997

== See also ==
- List of Toyota engines
