= Toyota UR engine =

Type of engine made by Toyota

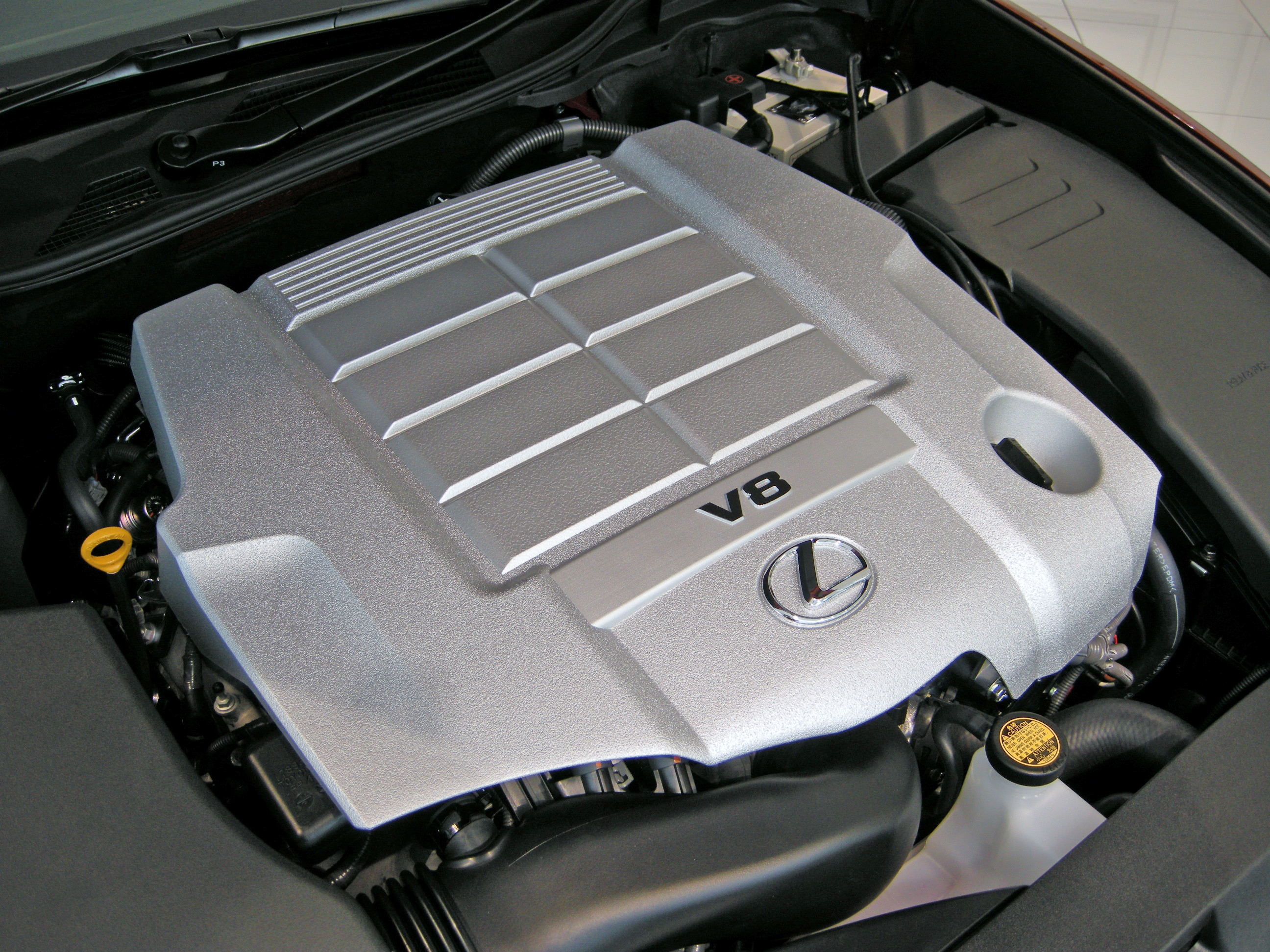
- 1UR-FSE engine in a Lexus GS460

Overview
- Manufacturer: Toyota Motor Corporation
- Production: 2006–present

Layout
- Configuration: 90° V8
- Displacement: 4.6 L (4,608 cc); 5.0 L (4,969 cc); 5.7 L (5,663 cc)
- Cylinder bore: 94 mm (3.7 in)
- Piston stroke: 83 mm (3.27 in); 89.5 mm (3.52 in); 102 mm (4.02 in)
- Cylinder block material: Die-cast aluminum
- Cylinder head material: Aluminum
- Valvetrain: DOHC 4 valves x cyl. w/VVT-i
- Compression ratio: 10.2:1, 11.8:1, 12.3:1

RPM range
- Max. engine speed: 7300 (2UR-GSE); 6000 (1UR-FE & 3UR-FE); 6600 (1UR-FSE & 2UR-FSE); 6800 (2UR-GSE in Lexus IS F)

Combustion
- Supercharger: Eaton Twin Vortices roots-type TRD kit (on some versions)
- Fuel system: D-4S direct injection
- Fuel type: Gasoline; E85 Ethanol (only on 3UR-FBE)
- Cooling system: Water cooled

Output
- Power output: 304–472 hp (227–352 kW; 308–479 PS)
- Torque output: 44.8–55.4 kg⋅m (439–543 N⋅m; 324–401 lb⋅ft)

Dimensions
- Dry weight: 222 kg (489 lb)

Chronology
- Predecessor: Toyota UZ engine
- Successor: Toyota V35A engine (V6, for 1UR & 3UR series); G40E (for 2UR-GSE)

The Toyota UR engine family is a 32-valve dual overhead camshaft V8 piston engine series which was first introduced in 2006, as the UZ series it replaced began phasing out. Production started with the 1UR-FSE engine with D-4S direct injection for the 2007 Lexus LS. The series launched with a die-cast aluminum engine block, aluminum cylinder heads and magnesium cylinder head covers. All UR engines feature variable valve timing for both intake and exhaust cams or Dual VVT-i. Timing chains are used to drive the camshafts. The UR engine has been produced in 4.6, 5.0, and 5.7-liter displacement versions.

== 1UR ==
=== 1UR-FSE ===
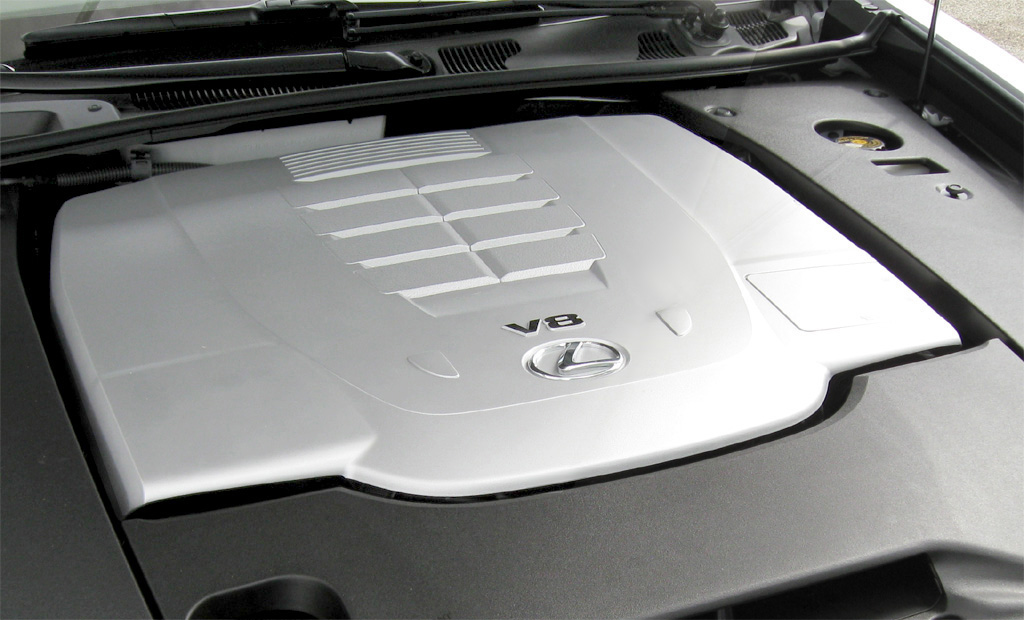
1UR-FSE

The 1UR-FSE V8 engine, introduced with the Lexus LS 460 & LS 460 L luxury sedans in 2006 has a 4.6 L (4,608 cc) displacement, which it gets from a bore and stroke of 94 mm × 83 mm (3.70 in × 3.27 in). The engine includes D-4S direct injection and dual VVT-iE producing 385 hp (287 kW; 390 PS) at 6,400 rpm and 51 kg⋅m (500 N⋅m; 369 lb⋅ft) at 4,100 rpm. The maximum engine speed is 6,800 RPM.

1UR-FSE undergoes X-ray inspection and a CT scan to ensure minimal deformation after the die-casting process. Camshafts are hollow to minimize weight.

Applications:

- 2006–2017 Lexus LS 460 & LS 460 L
- 2008–2011 Lexus GS 460
- 2009–2013 Toyota Crown Majesta

=== 1UR-FE ===
The 1UR-FE is based on the 1UR-FSE but lacks the D-4S direct injection technology. Originally used for Lexus vehicles in the Middle East, it was introduced in 2010 in other markets to replace the 2UZ-FE engine in truck and SUV applications. This engine produces 322 hp (240 kW; 326 PS) at 6,900 rpm and 46.9 kg⋅m (460 N⋅m; 339 lb⋅ft) at 4,400 rpm in the Lexus GS and LS. For the Toyota Land Cruiser and Lexus GX the engine produces 304 hp (227 kW; 308 PS) at 5,900 rpm and 44.8 kg⋅m (439 N⋅m; 324 lb⋅ft) at 3,800 rpm.

Applications:

- 2006–2017 Lexus LS 460 & LS 460 L (Middle East)
- 2005–2011 Lexus GS 460 (Middle East)
- 2009–2023 Lexus GX 460
- 2012–2021 Toyota Land Cruiser (Japan, China, Middle East and Australia)
- 2010–2012 Toyota Sequoia
- 2010–2019 Toyota Tundra

== 2UR ==
=== 2UR-GSE ===
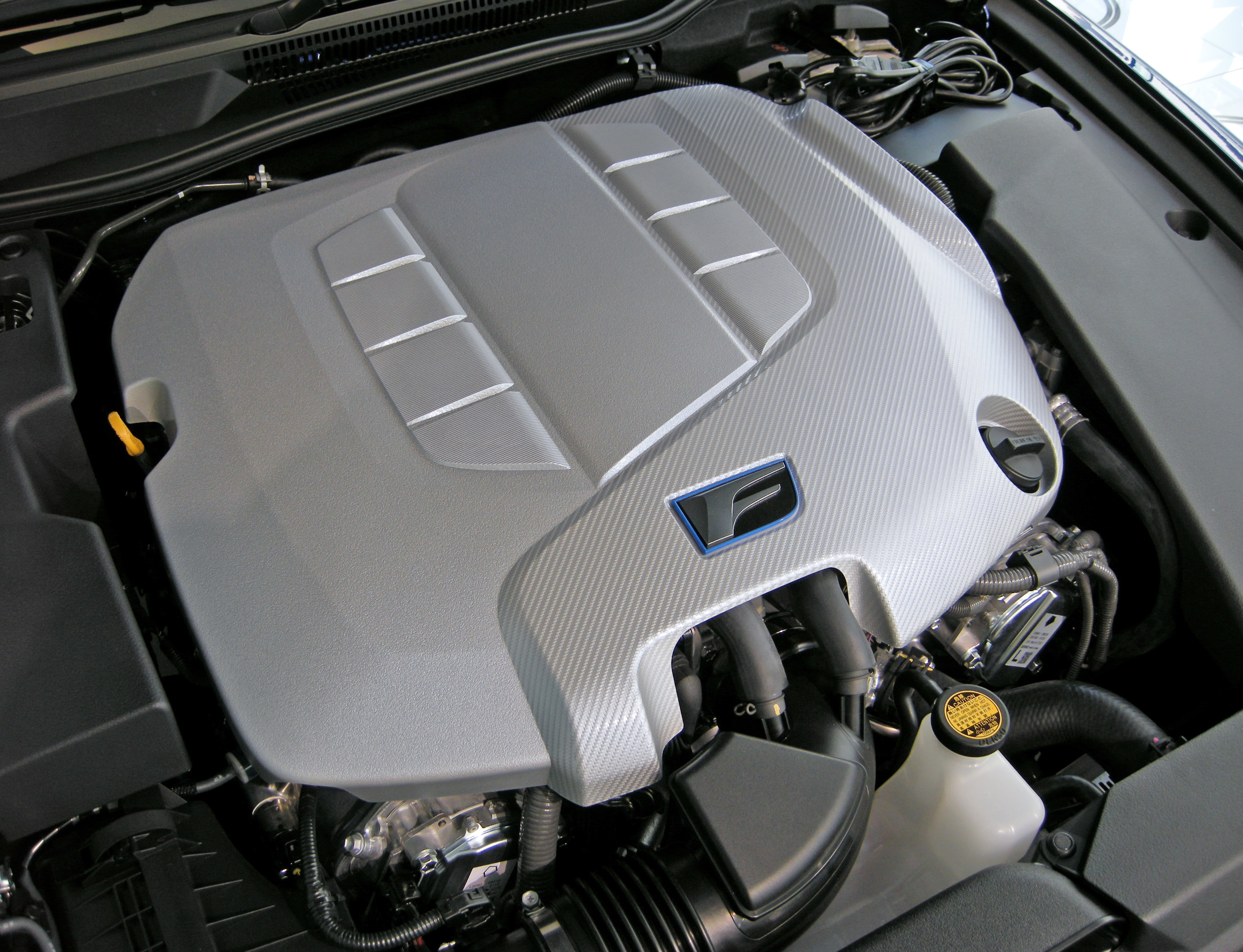
2UR-GSE

The 2UR-GSE is a 5.0 L; 303.2 cu in (4,969 cc) naturally aspirated V8 engine fitted to the Lexus IS F, RC F, GS F, LC 500, and IS 500. It is an all-alloy DOHC, 4 valves per cylinder with Yamaha-designed high-flow cylinder heads, titanium inlet valves, high-lift camshafts and dual-length intake. It has D-4S gasoline port and direct injection, Dual VVT-i with electric VVT-iE inlet camshaft actuation. Bore and stroke is 94 mm × 89.5 mm (3.70 in × 3.52 in). The engine's redline was increased with each iteration, ranging from 6,800 rpm to 7,300 rpm. The South Africa-based Gazoo Racing SA Toyota Hilux Dakar truck also utilizes the engine. The Lexus RCF GT3 utilizes a re-stroked version of this engine which displaces 5.4 liters and makes 373 kW (500 bhp; 507 PS).

In the IS F, the engine had an 11.8:1 compression ratio and produced 310 kW (416 bhp; 421 PS) @ 6,600 rpm and 51.3 kg⋅m (371 lb⋅ft; 503 N⋅m) @ 5,200 rpm of torque. In the RC F and GS F, the compression ratio was increased to 12.3:1, the rev limit raised to 7,300 rpm and output 348 kW (467 bhp; 473 PS) @ 7,100 rpm and 53.8 kg⋅m (389 lb⋅ft; 528 N⋅m) of torque at 4,800-5,600 rpm. The engine received a further increase in power to 351 kW (471 bhp; 477 PS) @ 7,100 rpm and 55.1 kg⋅m (399 lb⋅ft; 540 N⋅m) of torque at 4,800 rpm in the LC and 354 kW (475 bhp; 481 PS) @ 7,100 rpm and 54.6 kg⋅m (395 lb⋅ft; 535 N⋅m) of torque at 4,800 rpm in the 2019 RC F. Although since 2018, the RC F received a power decrease to 341 kW (457 bhp; 464 PS) in European markets.

From its introduction, the 2UR-GSE was exclusively available with an 8-speed automatic transmission, based on the Lexus LS460’s transmission. The Lexus LC500 is an exception, as that vehicle uses a 10-speed automatic. No manual transmission option has been offered from Toyota or Lexus from the factory with this engine.

Applications:

- 2007–2014 Lexus IS F (USE20)
- 2015–2025 Lexus RC F (USC10)
- 2015–2020 Lexus GS F (URL10)
- 2017–2026 Lexus LC 500 (URZ100)
- 2022–2025 Lexus IS 500 F-Sport Performance (USE30)
- 2016–2021 Toyota GR DKR Hilux
- 2026–present Toyota Supra Supercars Australia

=== 2UR-FSE ===
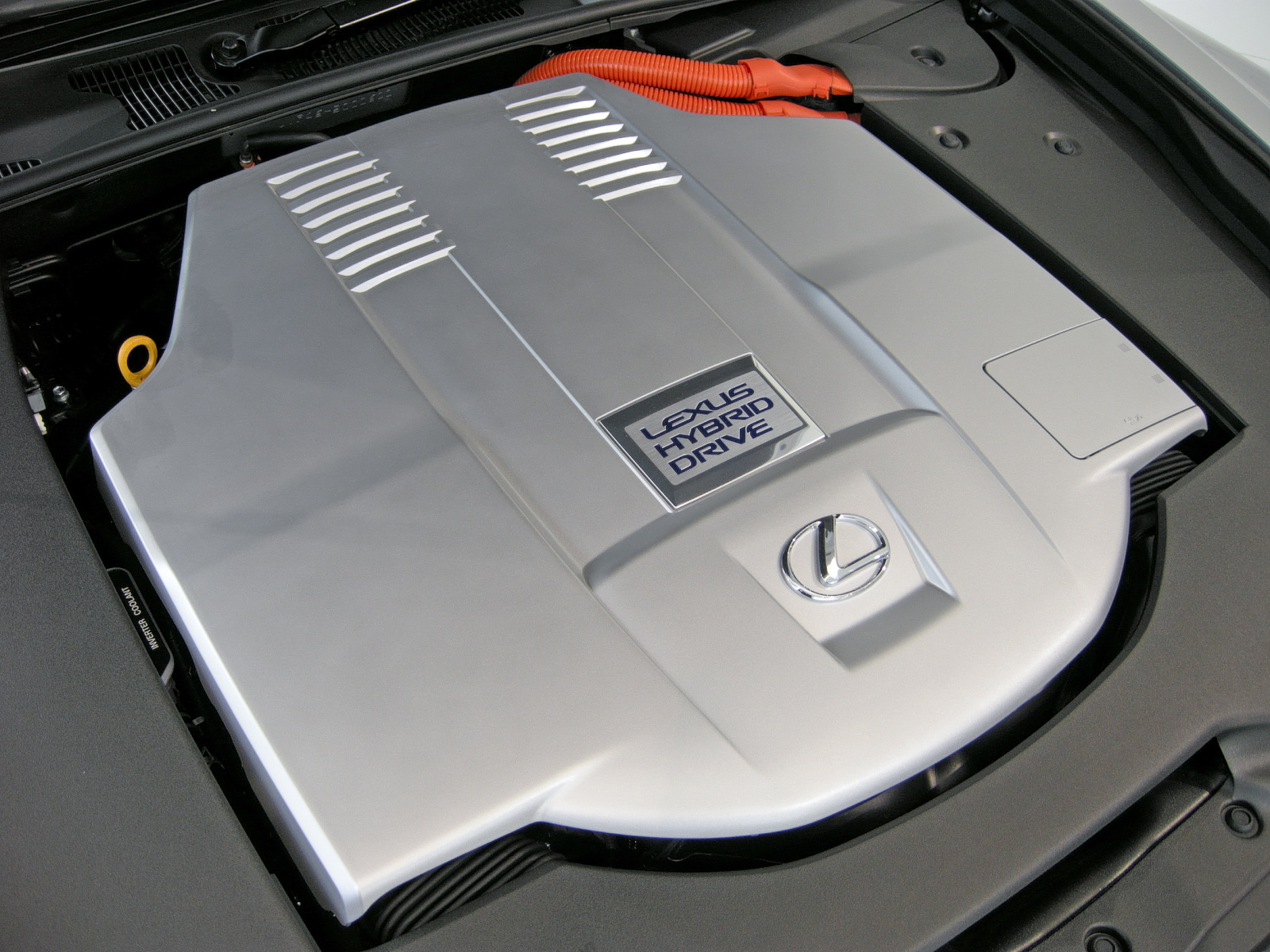
2UR-FSE

The 2UR-FSE is a 5.0 L (4,969 cc) engine which previously powered the Lexus LS 600h and the third-generation Toyota Century. It has D-4S gasoline port and direct injection, Dual VVT-i, and VVT-iE on the intake cam. It has the same bore and stroke as the 2UR-GSE, but produces 394 hp (294 kW; 399 PS) at 6,400 rpm and 53 kg⋅m (520 N⋅m; 383 lb⋅ft) at 4,000 rpm. The electric motors (Lexus Hybrid Drive) in the system add extra power into the drivetrain, allowing the combination to deliver 327 kW (439 hp; 445 PS) in total.

The engine's valve covers are made from a magnesium alloy, the cylinder heads are manufactured from aluminum alloy, while like the 1UR engine block it is die-cast to save weight.

Applications:

- 2007–2017 Lexus LS 600h & LS 600h L (UVF45/UVF46)
- 2018–present Toyota Century (UWG60)

== 3UR ==
=== 3UR-FE ===
The 3UR-FE is a 5.7-litre (5,663 cc) engine designed for use in the Toyota Tundra, Sequoia, Land Cruiser, and Lexus LX570 vehicles, without the D-4S gasoline direct injection but with Dual VVT-i. Bore and stroke is 94 mm × 102 mm (3.70 in × 4.02 in), it produces 381 hp (284 kW; 386 PS) @ 5,600 rpm and 55.4 kg⋅m (401 lb⋅ft; 543 N⋅m) of torque @ 3,600 rpm, with a compression ratio of 10.2:1. A stainless steel exhaust manifold incorporating a 3-way catalytic converter is used. The maximum engine speed is 6,000 RPM. This engine is cast at Toyota's Bodine Aluminum and currently assembled for Sequoia and Tundra at Toyota Motor Manufacturing Alabama and cast and assembled in Tahara, Japan for the Land Cruiser and Lexus vehicles. Over 1.3 million kilometers of durability testing have gone into the engine. E85 ethanol capability was optional for the 2009 model year. The engine's service weight is 222 kg (489 lb).

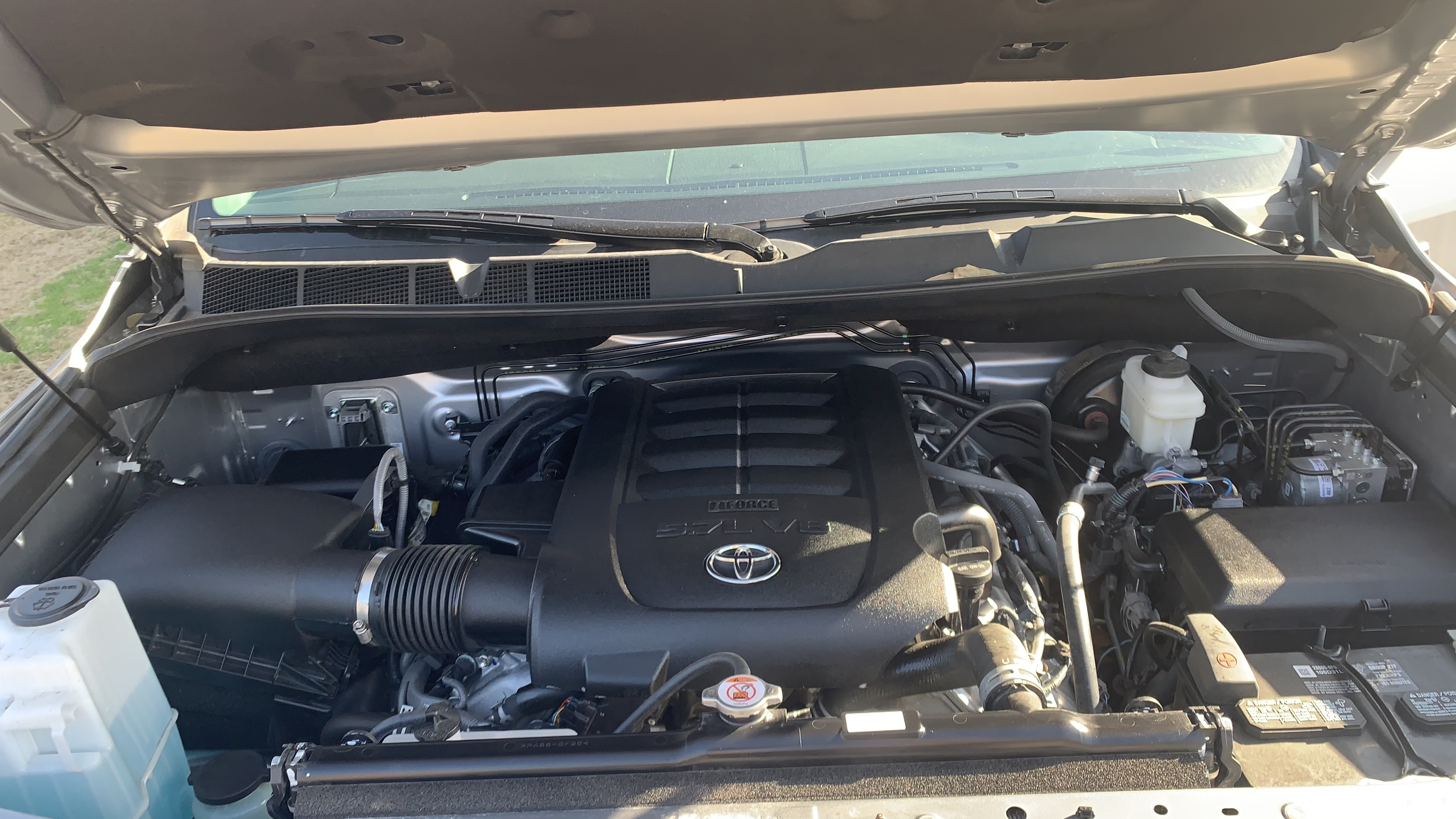
The 3UR-FE as seen in a Tundra.

For a time, Toyota offered an available bolt-on Toyota Racing Development Eaton Corporation Twin Vortices Series roots-type supercharger kit for the Tundra and Sequoia which bumps power up to 504 hp (376 kW; 511 PS) and 550 lb⋅ft (746 N⋅m) of torque. The supercharger kit could be installed by dealers and was covered under warranty. Later on, Magnuson offered an improved version of the supercharger kit which raised the output to 550 hp.

Applications:

- 2007–2021 Toyota Tundra
- 2007–2022 Toyota Sequoia
- 2007–2021 Toyota Land Cruiser 200 Series – US, Middle East and Left Hand Drive African markets only
- 2007–2021 Lexus LX 570

=== 3UR-FBE ===
An E85 Ethanol version of the 3UR-FE engine.

Applications:

- 2009 – 2013 Toyota Tundra
- 2009 – 2014 Toyota Sequoia

== See also ==
- General Motors LS-based small-block engine
- Ford Modular engine
- List of Toyota engines
- List of Toyota transmissions
