= Active Stabilizer Suspension System =

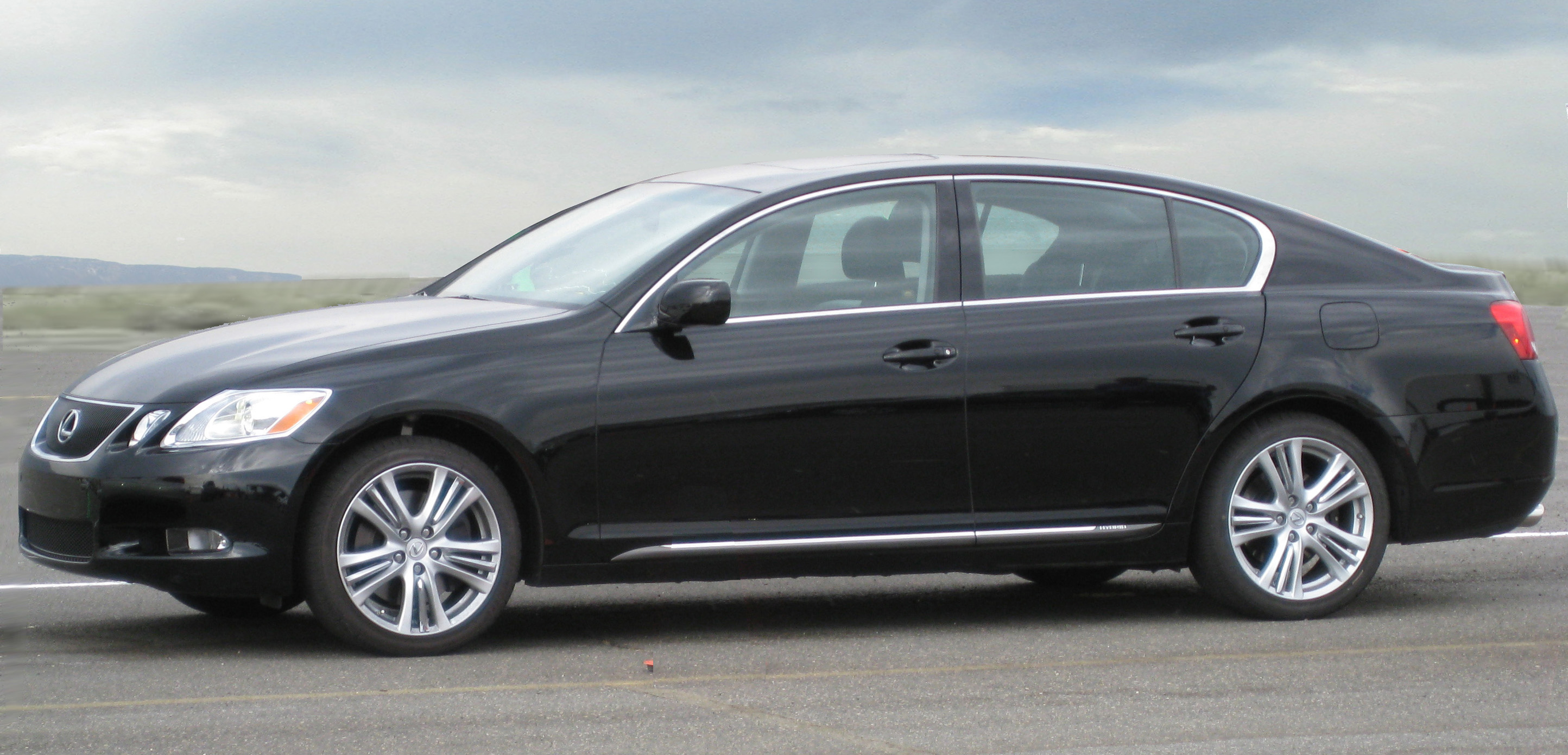
The electric powered active stabilizer suspension was first used on the 2007 Lexus GS.

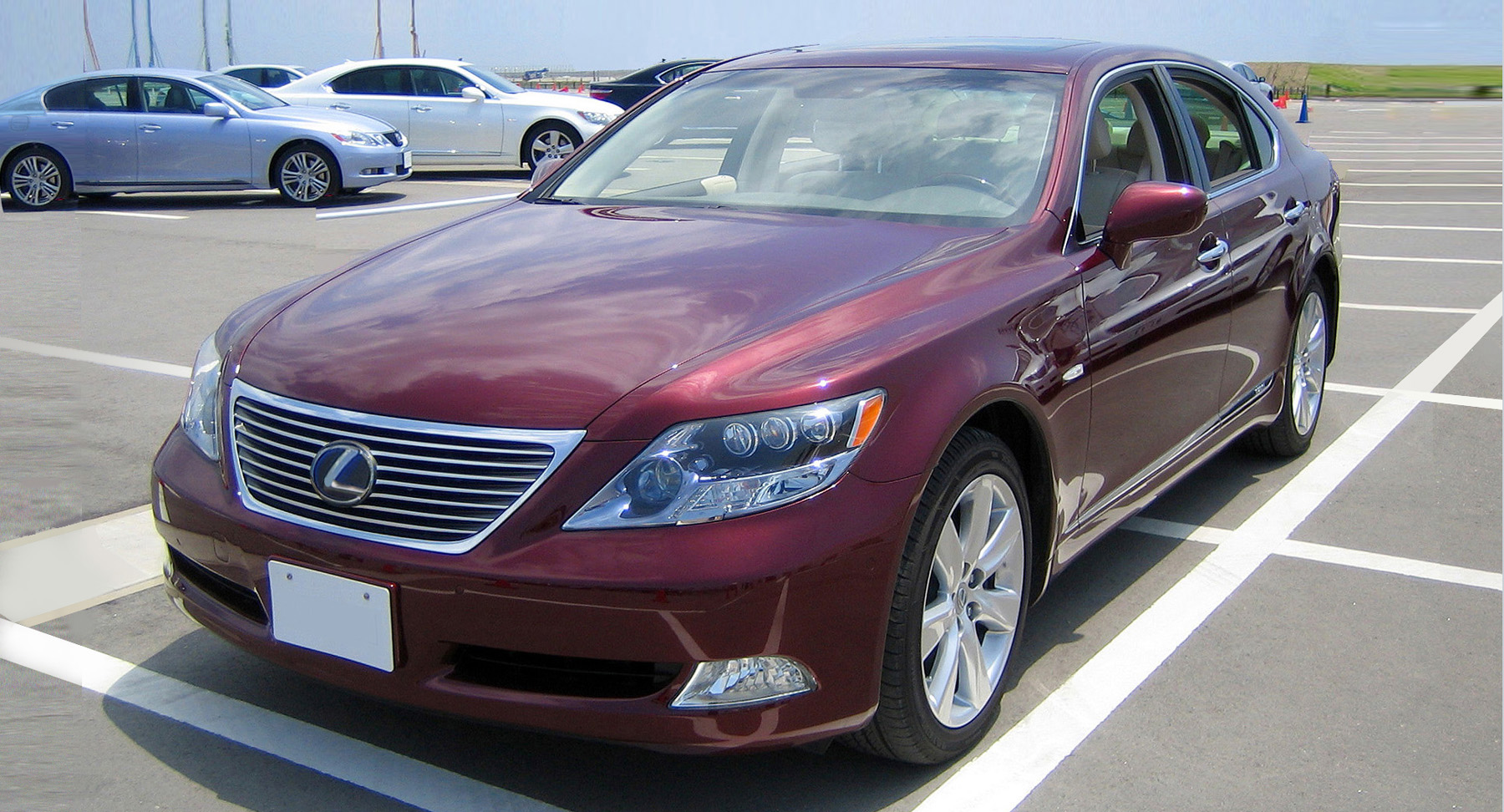
The 2008 Lexus LS 600h was the second vehicle to feature the active stabilizer system.

Active Power Stabilizer Suspension System (APSSS), is an electric active suspension system with active anti-roll bars developed by Toyota Motor Corporation for its high-end vehicles including Lexus models. By altering stabilizer bar stiffness, this system acts to reduce body tilt during cornering, keeping the vehicle more level during turns and improving handling, as opposed to the natural tendency of a vehicle to roll due to the lateral forces experienced during high-speed maneuvering. The active stabilizer system relies on vehicle body sensors and electric motors. The first production usage of this system was introduced in August 2005 with the Lexus GS430 sport sedan, followed by the 2008 Lexus LS 600h luxury sedan. The development of APSSS is claimed to be the world's first electric active stabilizer system. It is a system improvement of an earlier Toyota technology called Toyota TEMS (Toyota Electronic Modulated Suspension).

== How it works ==
The APSSS utilizes sensors for steering wheel speed, steering angle, along with yaw and acceleration/deceleration sensors. These sensors are tied to an electronic control unit (ECU), which in turn connects with actuators consisting of 46V DC brushless motors and reduction mechanisms. Mounted with the vehicle suspension stabilizer bars, each reduction mechanism houses a wave generator, flexible gear, and circular gear.

The system is activated when the vehicle enters a high-speed turn, and the sensors register vertical, longitudinal, and transverse forces which contribute to body lean and additional movements. Along with steering data, these are sent to the ECU where they are processed, with the forces necessary to counteract body roll movements calculated. Corrective instructions are then sent to the suspension motors and reduction mechanisms. The reduction mechanism gears activate to adjust suspension rigidity, torquing the stabilizer bars and thus increasing sway resistance and reducing body roll movements. Developed jointly with Aisin, APSSS engineers found that compared with prior hydraulically actuated active suspension systems, which rely on hydraulic servomechanisms, the electric APSSS offered a faster response time (within 20 milliseconds) and reduced energy consumption characteristics.

== Vehicles ==
Vehicles that have offered Active Power Stabilizer Suspension System (APSSS) to date, listed by model year (system was offered as an option):

- 2006 Lexus GS 350
- 2006 Lexus GS 430
- 2006 Lexus GS 450h
- 2008 Lexus GS 460
- 2008 Lexus LS 600h
- 2008 Lexus LS 600h L
- 2010 Lexus RX 450h
- 2013 Lexus LS 600h F SPORT Active Stabiliser System

== See also ==
- Active suspension
- Height adjustable suspension
- Lexus Kinetic Dynamic Suspension System (KDSS)
- Self-levelling suspension
- Toyota TEMS
