= Lexus LS (XF40) =

Fourth generation of Lexus LS

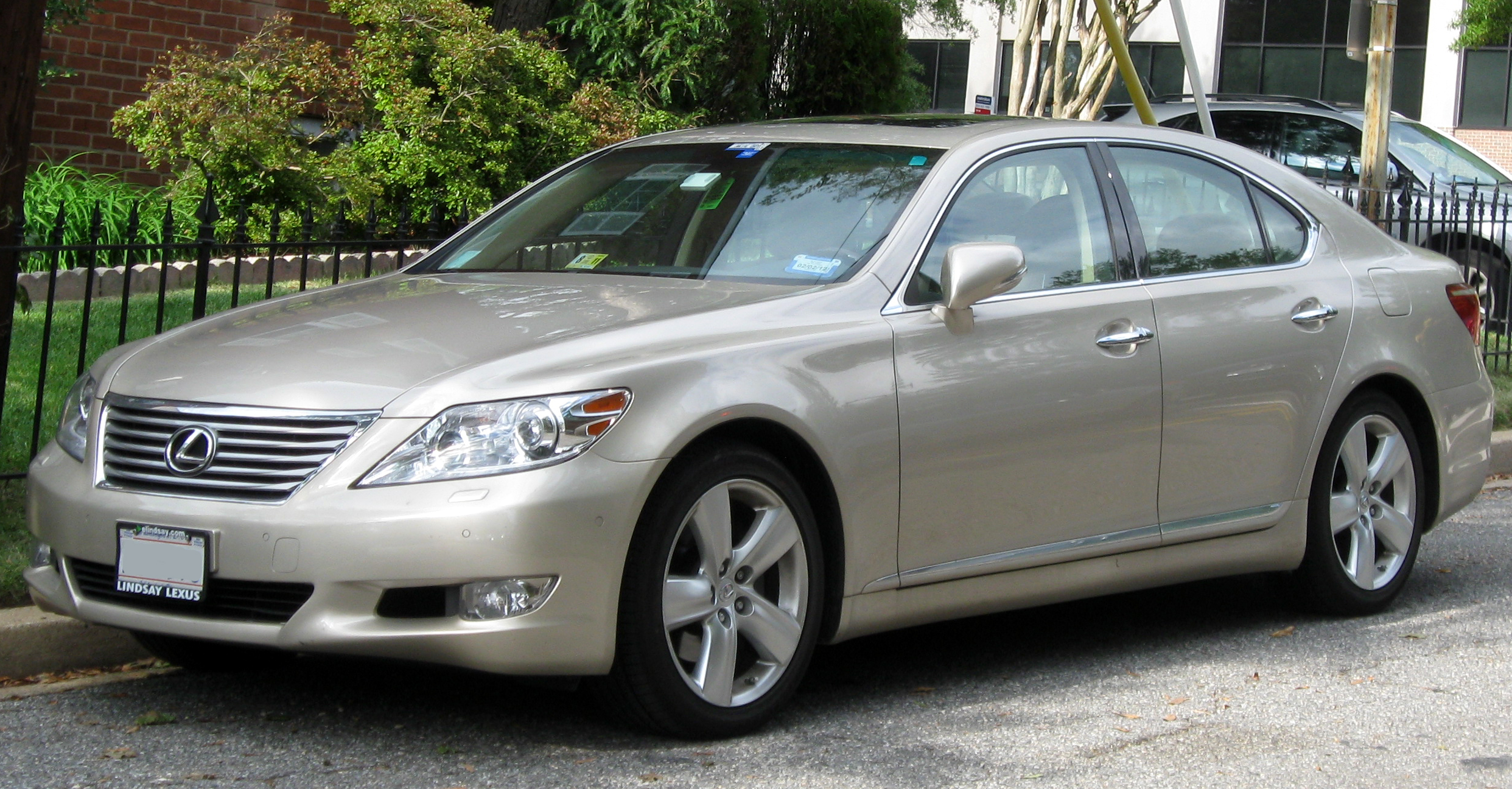
- Lexus LS 460 (USF40; first facelift)

Overview
- Manufacturer: Toyota
- Production: August 2006 – October 2017
- Model years: 2007–2017
- Assembly: Japan: Tahara, Aichi (Tahara plant)
- Designer: Yo Hiruta (2003, 2004)

Body and chassis
- Class: Full-size luxury car
- Body style: 4-door sedan
- Layout: Front-engine, rear-wheel-drive; Front-engine, all-wheel-drive
- Platform: Toyota N platform
- Related: Toyota Century (G60) (for LS 600h L)

Powertrain
- Engine: 4.6 L 1UR-FE V8; 4.6 L 1UR-FSE V8; 5.0 L 2UR-FSE V8 (hybrid)
- Electric motor: 1KM AC synchronous
- Transmission: 8-speed AA80E RWD automatic; 8-speed AA80F AWD automatic; Hybrid Synergy Drive L110F AWD automatic
- Hybrid drivetrain: Hybrid Synergy Drive L110F

Dimensions
- Wheelbase: SWB: 2,969 mm (116.9 in); LWB: 3,091 mm (121.7 in)
- Length: 2006–2009: SWB: 5,029 mm (198.0 in) LWB: 5,151 mm (202.8 in); 2009–2017: SWB: 5,060 mm (199.2 in) LWB: 5,179 mm (203.9 in)
- Width: 1,875 mm (73.8 in)
- Height: 1,476 mm (58.1 in); 1,481 mm (58.3 in) (hybrid); 1,466 mm (57.7 in) (air suspension)
- Curb weight: SWB: 1,950–2,320 kg (4,300–5,110 lb); LWB: 2,040–2,380 kg (4,500–5,250 lb)

Chronology
- Predecessor: Lexus LS (XF30)
- Successor: Lexus LS (XF50)

The Lexus LS (XF40) is the fourth generation of the Lexus LS—a series of full-size luxury cars. Produced by Lexus, the luxury division of the Japanese automaker Toyota, the XF40 served as the flagship vehicle of the former's lineup from 2006 until production ended in 2017.

The successor to the XF30 LS, the development of the XF40 began under the direction of Moritaka Yoshida. Focusing on simplicity, the XF40 was designed by Yo Hiruta, incorporating the L-finesse design philosophy—first introduced in 2001 with the GS. The LS 460 debuted at the North American International Auto Show in January 2006, while the hybrid–electric version, the LS 600h, was unveiled at the New York International Auto Show in April 2006. Official series manufacture began at the facility in Tahara, Aichi, in August 2006. Each XF40 model was produced in two wheelbase variants: a short-wheelbase version and a long-wheelbase version, the latter designated by an "L" at the end of the model name. (Note: For example, the LS 460 is the short-wheelbase model, while the LS 460 L is the long-wheelbase model.)

The XF40 was the subject of two updates, the first of which occurred in 2009. This involved minor updates to its front and rear fascia, engine power, and interior. The second—and most significant—occurred in 2013, including noteworthy upgrades to incorporate the company's corporate fascia, comprising the implementation of the "spindle" grille and prominently redesigned headlamps. Production of the XF40 ended in October 2017, and it was replaced by the XF50 LS. The XF40 is the recipient of numerous accolades, including the World Car of the Year award in 2007.

== History ==
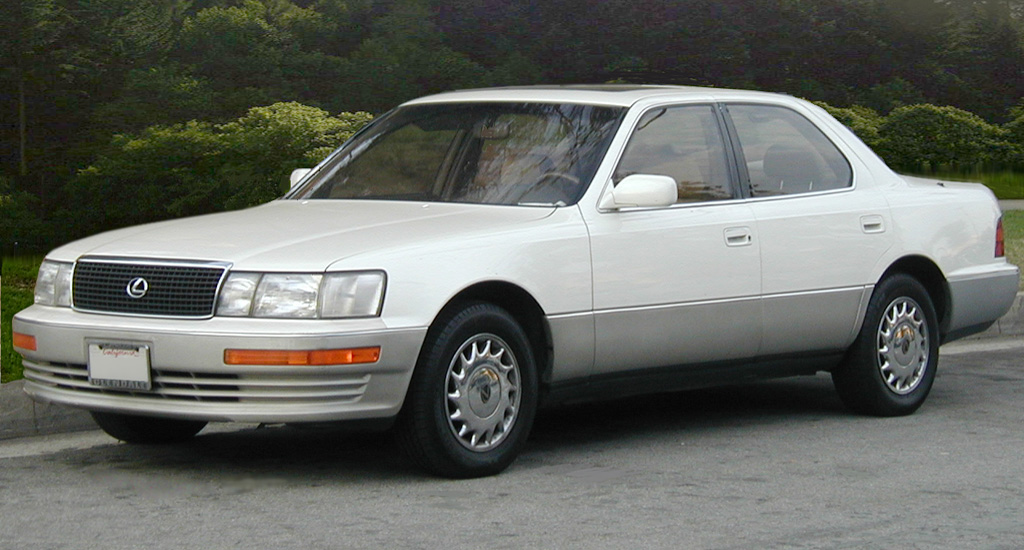
The XF10 LS marked the debut of both the LS model and the Lexus brand.

Toyota is a Japanese automaker that was founded in 1937 by Kiichiro Toyoda. In August 1983, Toyota chairman Eiji Toyoda initiated the F1 project ("Flagship" and "No. 1" vehicle; alternatively called the "Circle-F" project), a clandestine initiative aimed at creating a world-class luxury sedan for the global market. Over the course of six years of research and development, a team comprising 60 designers, 1,400 engineers across 24 teams, 2,300 technicians, and more than 200 support staff developed around 450 flagship prototypes and 900 engine prototypes, with the development representing an expenditure of over US$1 billion. In January 1989, the LS 400 debuted at the North American International Auto Show, in Detroit, Michigan, marking both the debut of the LS model and the Lexus brand.

The second generation was released in 1995, followed by the third in 2000. The development of the fourth generation of the LS began around 2001, as Lexus was shifting its design strategy towards a more diversified product lineup, with new-vehicle launches largely focused on global markets. Development was led by Takeshi Yoshida, the managing officer of research and development at Lexus, and Satoru Maruyamano, chief engineer of the project, while the design of the car was completed under the direction of Yo Hiruta. Approximately 2,000 engineers were involved in the development of the then-forthcoming LS, known by the codename XF40.

Five years after development began, the XF40 LS 460 debuted at the North American International Auto Show in January 2006, followed by the LS 600h L at the New York International Auto Show in April of that year. Official serial manufacture of the LS began at the facility in Tahara, Aichi, in August 2006. At launch, Lexus aimed to sell 30,000 LS 460s each year in the United States, of which about 65 percent were expected to be the standard-wheelbase version. The LS 600h model was projected to contribute around 1,500 sales annually.

== Design and engineering ==
=== Exterior ===
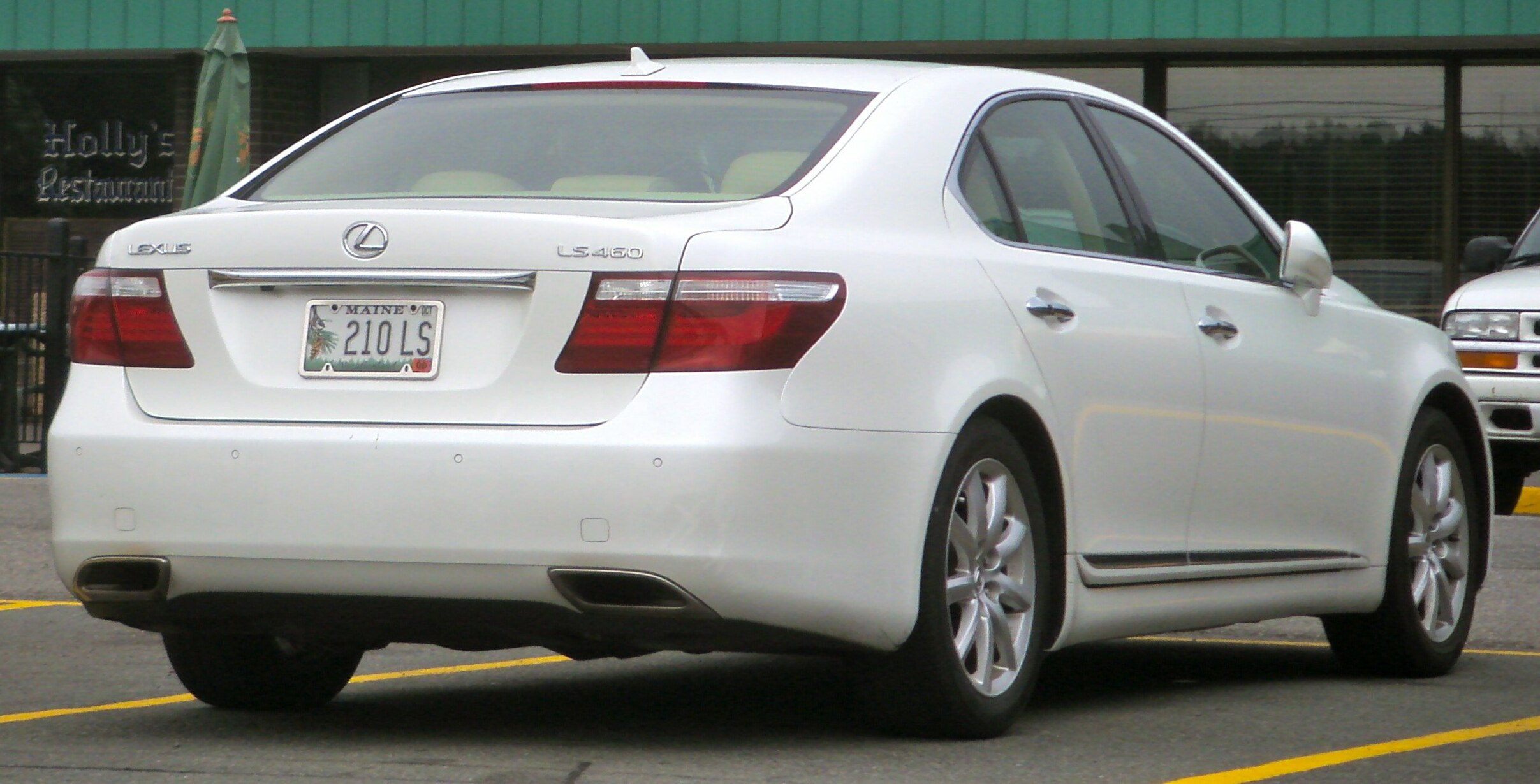
Rear view of the standard wheelbase LS 460 (USF40)

The fourth generation Lexus flagship was the first LS to receive the styling cues of Lexus' new design direction, L-finesse. The design features body forms running the length of the car, with wheel arches, arrow-shaped chrome trim, a grille set slightly below the level of the headlamps, and a fastback rear decklid. Compared to the previous generation LS, the forward and aft coefficient of lift was reduced to 0.02 and 0.01, respectively, while aerodynamic drag remained the same (C_{d} 0.26). Exterior-wise, the LS 460 L has a similar profile as the LS 460, with identical overhangs in both front and rear; the rear passenger doors are noticeably longer in the stretched model. Design patents for the vehicle's exterior design, including front and rear fascias, side windows, and lights, were filed with the United States Patent and Trademark Office on 3 October 2005.

Additional details of the design include adaptive headlamps housed in hand polished surrounds designed to look like Baccarat crystal tumblers, chrome exhaust vents integrated into the rear bumper, and "L"/"S" curve shapes. The fenders are produced using a 5200-ton press, which when introduced made it the world's strongest stamping press. The model's new paint finish is applied to bare-metal body panels which are first prepared by a six-axis buffing robot with 3D movements, the entire paint finish is wet-sanded twice by hand between layers of paint application. Both front and rear window frames are each constructed from a single die-cast zinc piece, plated in chrome and then polished by hand.

=== Interior ===
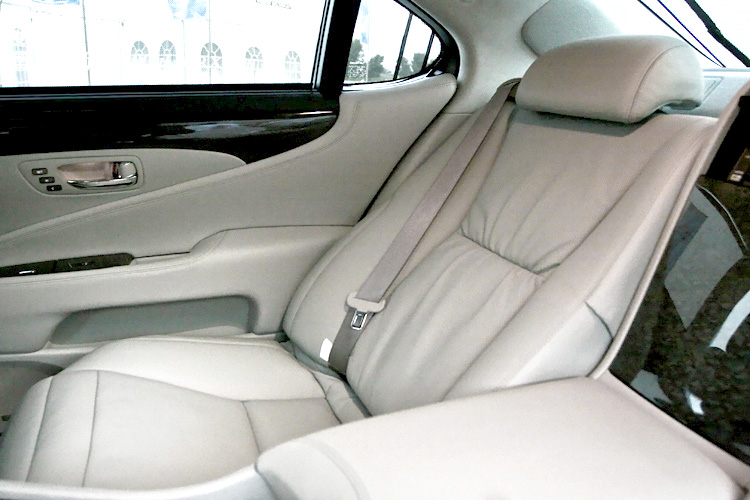
Executive rear seat in the long wheelbase Lexus LS.

Interior features include a 19-speaker Mark Levinson Reference Surround Sound System, Gracenote, and a 30 GB HDD with room for 2,000 songs. The fifth generation HDD-based Lexus navigation system features XM NavTraffic, a real-time traffic monitoring system with dynamic rerouting (in the U.S., and similar systems elsewhere). Keyless SmartAccess with push-button start, Optitron instrument panel with TFT multi-information display, auxiliary MP3 player input, and a 5-position tire pressure display are standard equipment. A 24-hour concierge/emergency aid service, Lexus Link (later Lexus Enform), was offered in North America, with the analogous G-Link system offered in Japan. Japanese market LS sedans also feature MiniDisc compatibility, television reception, onboard security surveillance cameras, and remote cellphone access.

Comfort and convenience features range from a 16-way adjustable heated and cooled driver seat to a rear cabin with power reclining memory seats, a cool box, and five powered sunshades. Certain versions of the LS can be equipped with climate control features such as first automobile ceiling air diffusers, air purifiers, air ionisers, and four-zone climate control with infrared body temperature sensors. The leather on the seats and steering wheel are made smoother than previous models, due to being buffed longer in production, the steering wheel is buffed for three hours and incorporates a whip stitching pattern. Upgraded materials (such as a headliner made out of ecsaine, a suede-like material used by couturier Yves Saint-Laurent) are offered for the interior. Inside, the wood veneer trim has been laminated to aluminum instead of fiberglass by Yamaha's piano craftsmen. A special-order "Executive" seating package on long wheelbase models includes a rear seat DVD entertainment system with ceiling fold-down LCD screen, fixed center console with a swivel tray table, and a passenger-side shiatsu and shoulder massaging ottoman seat.

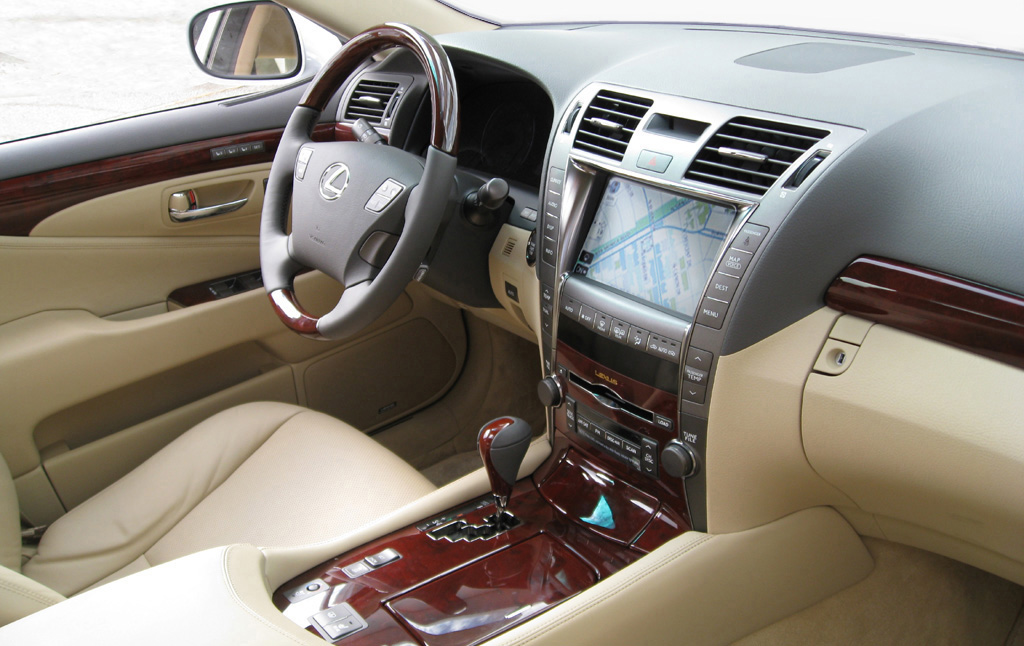
2006 Lexus LS interior (original)

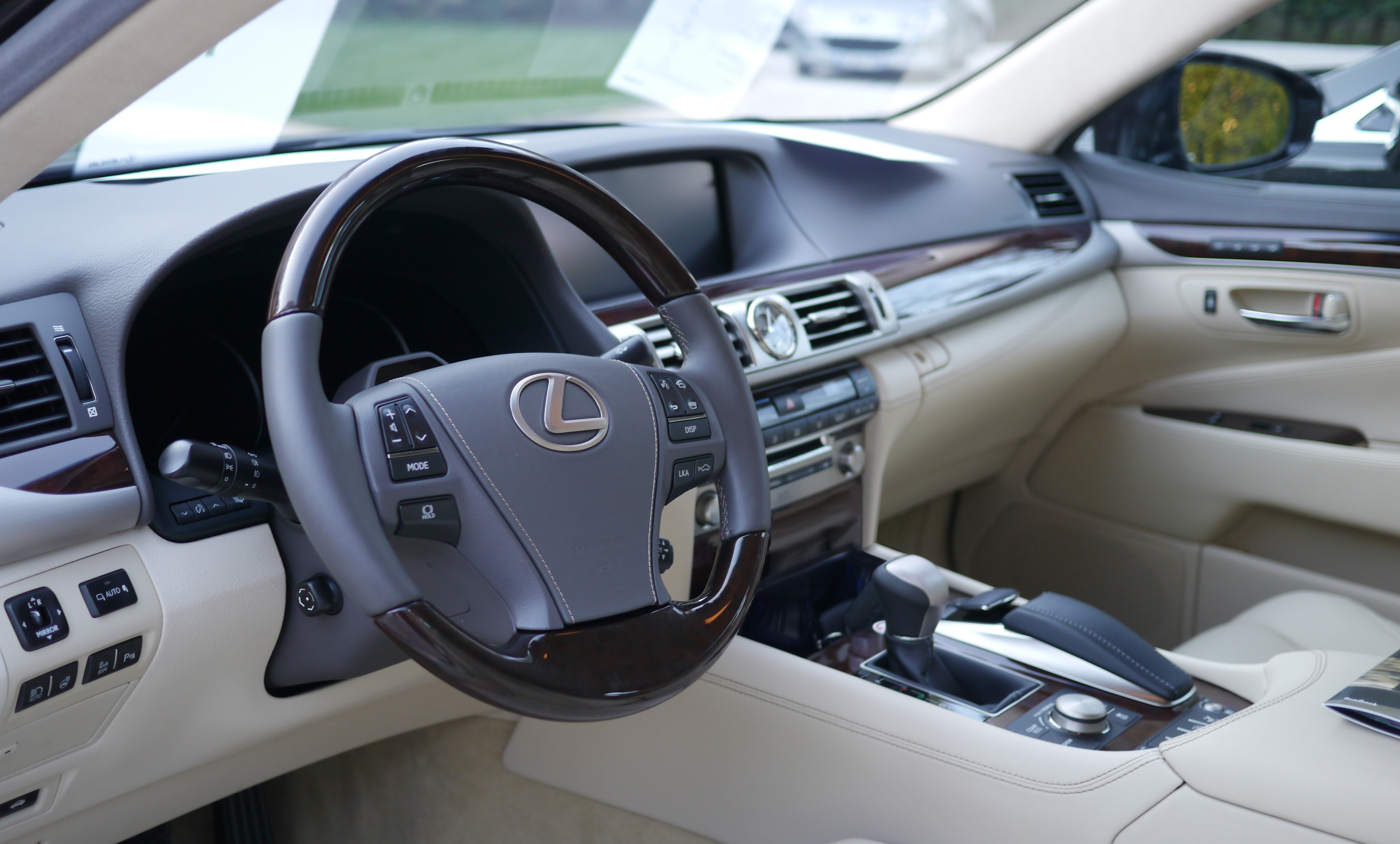
2013 Lexus LS interior (refresh)

=== Driver-assist systems ===
The Intelligent Parking Assist System feature (also called Advanced Parking Guidance System) can parallel-park or reverse-park the LS into a preselected space with minimal brake input at the push of a button. This feature uses the backup camera and parking sensors. Other drive-assist features include Dynamic Radar Cruise Control, which can accelerate and brake while monitoring traffic (similar to Mercedes-Benz's Distronic Plus), a Brake Hold button, which prevents creeping forward motion when the driver's foot is off the brake pedal, and the Automatic Parking Brake, which can engage the parking brake simultaneously whenever the transmission is shifted to Park.

The Lane Keeping Assist (not available on the LS 600h due to conflict with LED headlamps) feature includes the Lane Departure Warning (LDW) and Lane Keep (LK) systems. When activated, the LDW system will issue an audiovisual warning and LK will apply a brief corrective steering response when veering motion is detected. The LK system (activated when the radar cruise control is engaged) will actively provide continued steering assist.

=== Safety systems ===
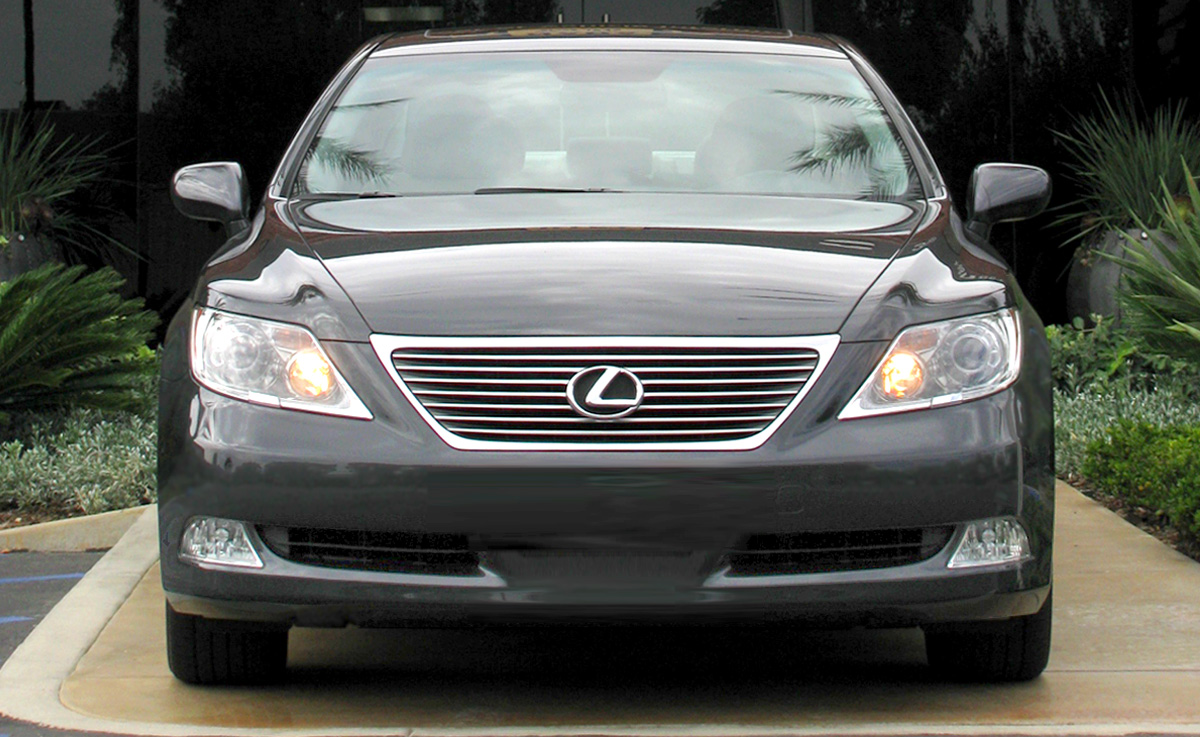
The Lexus LS pre-crash system uses grille-mounted radar sensors and windshield stereocameras.

Debuted on the fourth generation Lexus LS, the next-generation Pre-Crash System (Pre-Collision in the U.S.) offers forward and rear protection. The Frontal Pre-Crash system will activate a warning buzzer and red dash lights to alert the driver if a potential hazard is detected in the vehicle's path. If the system detects a potential collision, the system will adjust steering and braking responsiveness. If a collision is determined to be unavoidable, the seatbelt pretensioners will activate, and the brakes will automatically engage to slow the vehicle. The Rear Pre-Crash system, the first active rear collision safety feature in an automobile, uses trunk-mounted obstacle detection and warning systems; if a rear collision is deemed unavoidable, sensor-equipped Pre-Crash Intelligent Headrests in the front seats will adjust position upwards up to 25 mm (0.98 in) and forwards up to 60 mm (2.4 in) to cradle the head during impact, reducing whiplash. The rear Pre-Crash system in the U.S. market waited for FCC regulatory approval. For 2010, the LS hybrid further incorporated an all-TFT instrument panel display, which featured the addition of a night vision capability with pedestrian detection.

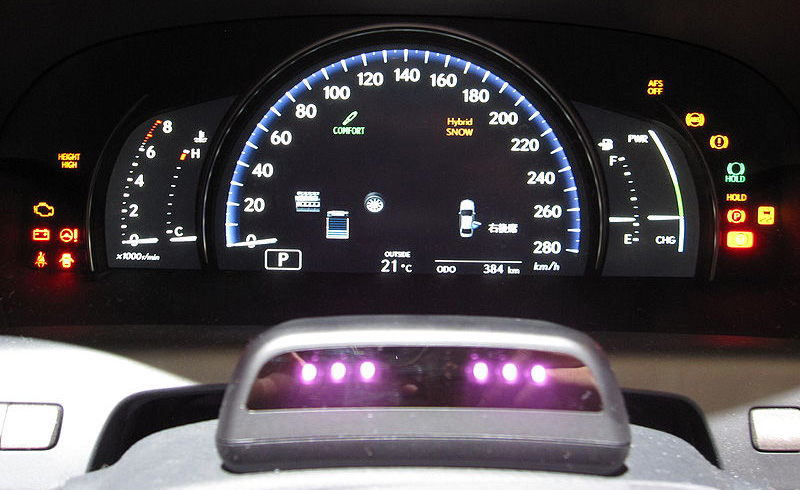
2010 Driver Monitoring System with LCD Night Vision cluster

A new active safety feature called the Driver Monitoring System debuted on the LS 600h L sedan. The Driver Monitoring System uses a CCD camera placed on the steering column to track driver attentiveness by eye tracking. Using infrared detectors, this system will respond if a collision is imminent and the driver not paying attention (a warning alarm will sound followed by a brief automatic application of the braking system).

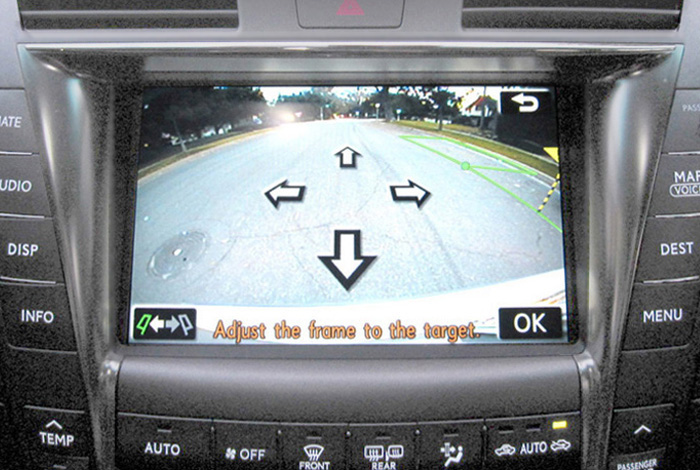
Lexus LS backup camera/navigation display, with Parking Assist enabled.

Standard active safety features also include electronically controlled braking (ECB), anti-lock brakes (ABS), and traction control (TRAC). The stability/traction control system, Vehicle Dynamics Integrated Management (VDIM) (with disable button), incorporates Electronically Controlled Brake (ECB), Anti-Lock Brakes (ABS), Electronic Brakeforce Distribution (EBD), Traction Control (TRC) and Vehicle Stability Control (VSC) active safety systems with the Adaptive Variable Suspension (AVS), Electric Power Steering (EPS) and Variable Gear Ratio Steering (VGRS) systems. VDIM integrates these systems to improve vehicle responsiveness to driver input and prevent loss of control. An Emergency Steering Assist system acts to minimize body roll and improve vehicle responsiveness in sudden maneuvers. This system reduces the steering gear ratio and prompts the suspension to adopt stiffer settings, helping make emergency maneuvers more stable and controlled. Passive safety features include eight to ten standard airbags (depending on model, up to eleven with upgraded rear seats), passenger detection systems, front and rear crumple zones, three-point seatbelts with pretensioners and force limiters, and a reinforced steel body. Dual-stage driver and twin-chambered front passenger airbags, front knee airbags, full-length side curtain airbags, and Thorax-Abdomen-Pelvis (TAP) airbags are also installed.

=== 2009 updates ===
The 2009 (2010 model year) refresh added redesigned forward and rear fascias, updated interior, an active Eco Mode energy-saving capability, and redesigned chassis and drivetrain components to the non-hybrid models. The interior received additional chrome trim for the center console, an optional DVD entertainment system behind the center armrest (versus the ceiling drop-down version available before), and in certain markets, an all-digital instrument panel with night vision capability. The "Executive" seating option gained a five-seat configuration, and vibrating massage for both outboard rear seats was introduced. The exterior paint gained a self-repairing clear coat.

Introduced in 2009 for the 2010 model year was the LS 460 Sport, a performance-oriented trim available only on the rear-wheel drive standard wheelbase model, equipped with a sport-tuned air suspension, Brembo brakes, forged alloy wheels, paddle shifters, body kit, and a unique two-tone interior. The LS 460 Sport featured the Sport Direct Shift transmission, also found in the Lexus IS F, which allows for faster shift times. The torque converter can lockup from 2nd to 8th gears. The LS 460 Sport retains the same V8 engine as other non-hybrid LS models.

Also debuting in late 2009 for the 2010 model year was the revised LS hybrids, including refreshed front and rear fascias, a four-bar grille, the addition of side mirror turn signals, and new wheel designs. The 2010 models also were the introductory year for the LS hybrid in the Middle East and Indonesia. For the Japanese market, the 2010 models saw the introduction of an interior customization program called "L-Select", which allowed owners to have hybrid and non-hybrid LS models built to their material trim specifications.

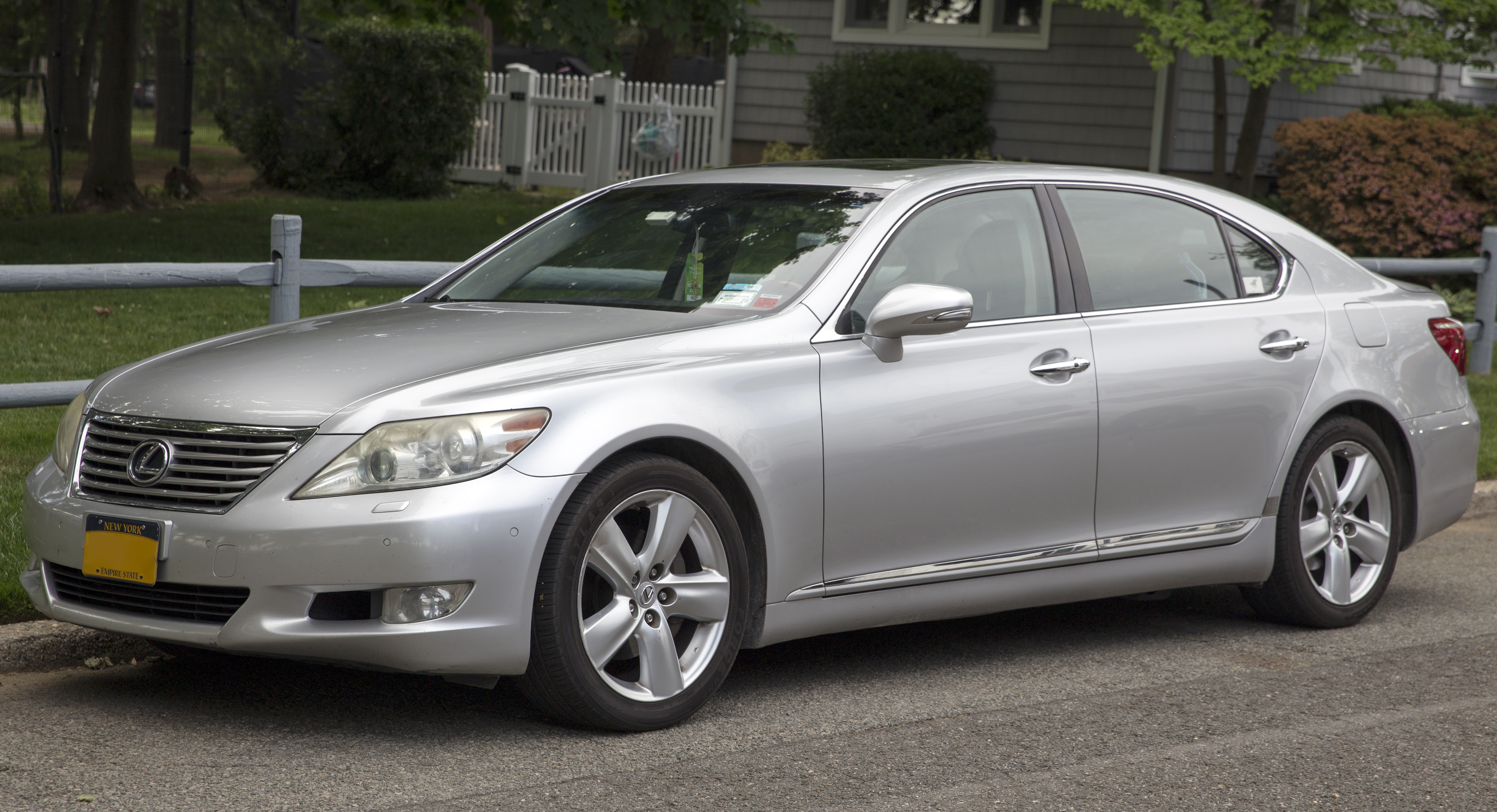
2012 Lexus LS 460 L (US)

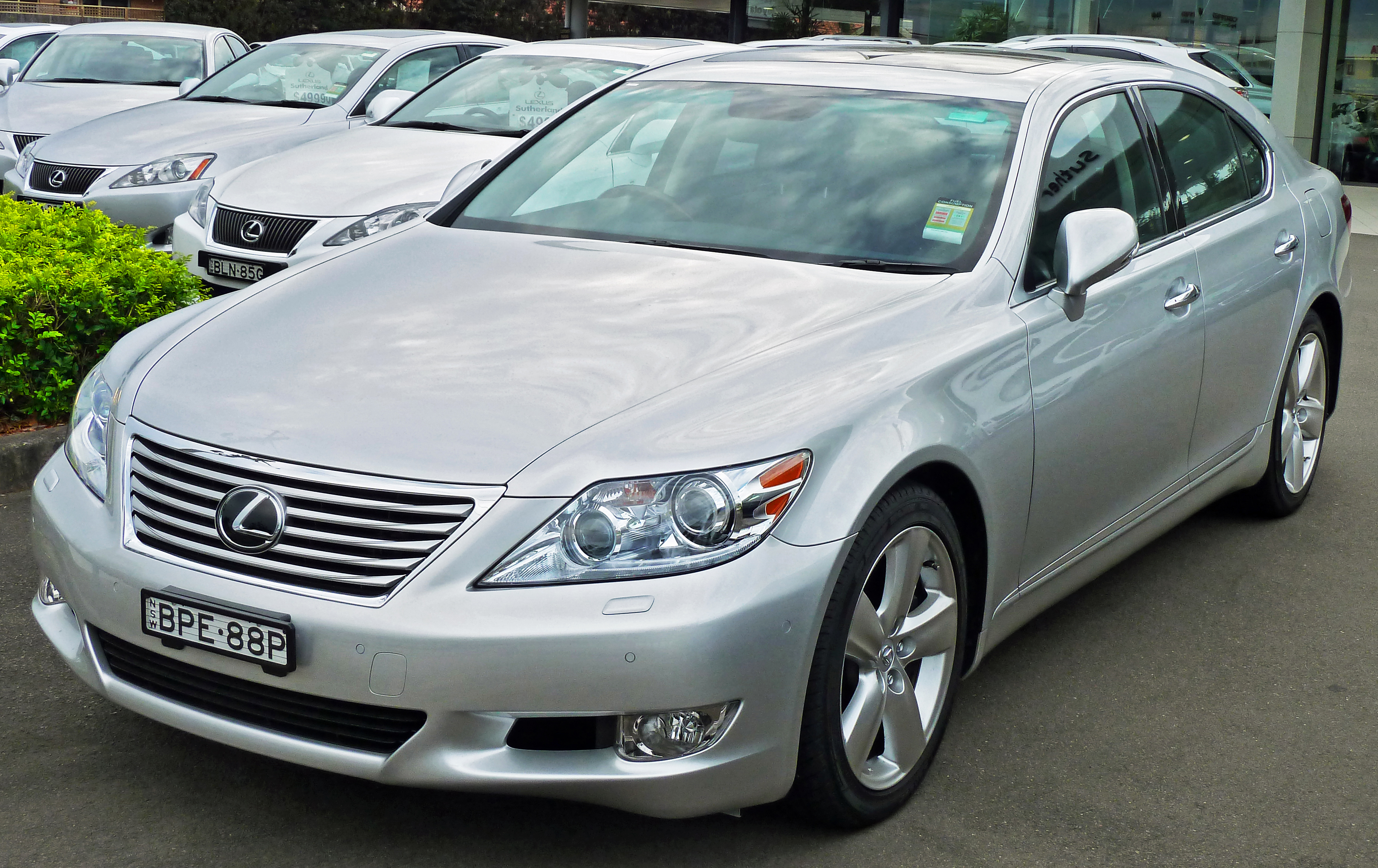
2010–2011 Lexus LS 460 (USF40R; Australia)

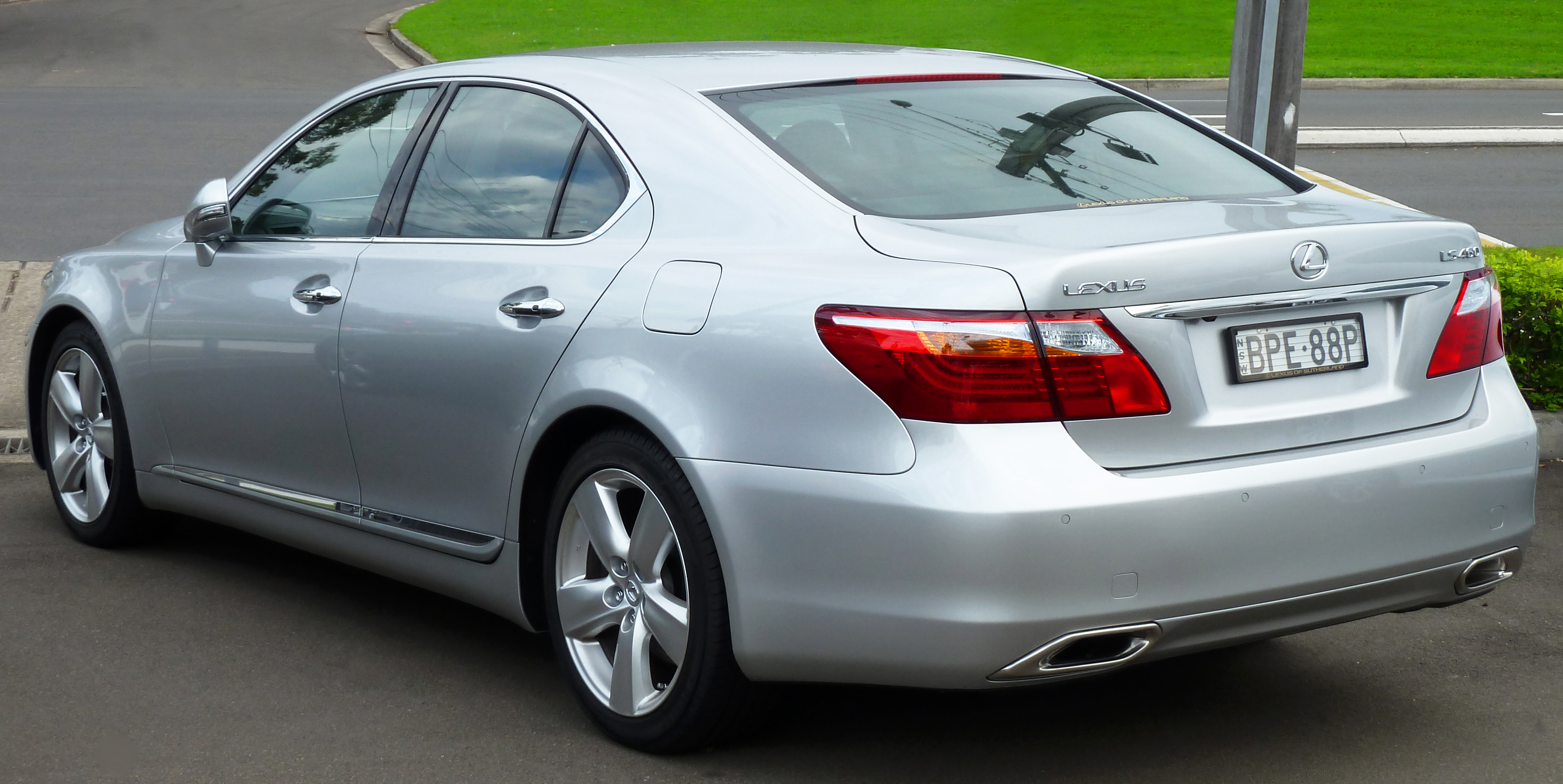
Rear view of 2010–2011 Lexus LS 460 (USF40R; Australia)

=== 2013 updates ===
Lexus released an official photograph of its restyled XF40 series in July 2012 which was released for the 2013 model year. The substantial update incorporates the new Lexus corporate fascia, comprising the "spindle" grille and consequently sees the fitment of a redesigned hood, reshaped front fenders and headlamps, plus a new bumper. These styling revisions see the retention of the side profile and doors, including rear fenders. Thus, the newly designed tail-lamps, trunk lid, and rear bumper are only partially modified. The sport package, still only offered on the standard wheelbase variant but now including all-wheel drive as well as rear-wheel drive, is now known as the F-Sport.

Reportedly, the refresh involved 1000 engineers and replaced 3000 out of 6000 new parts.

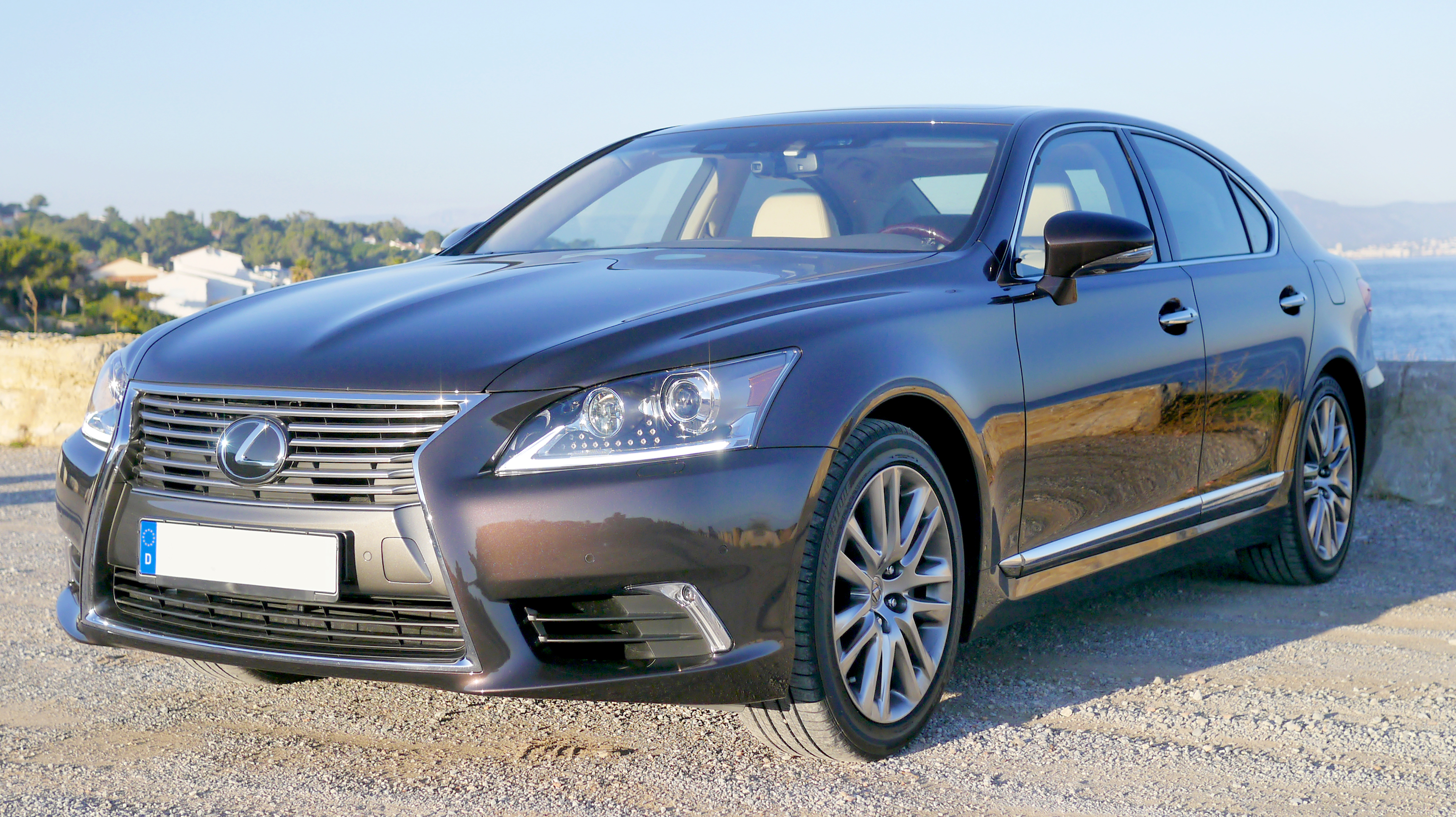
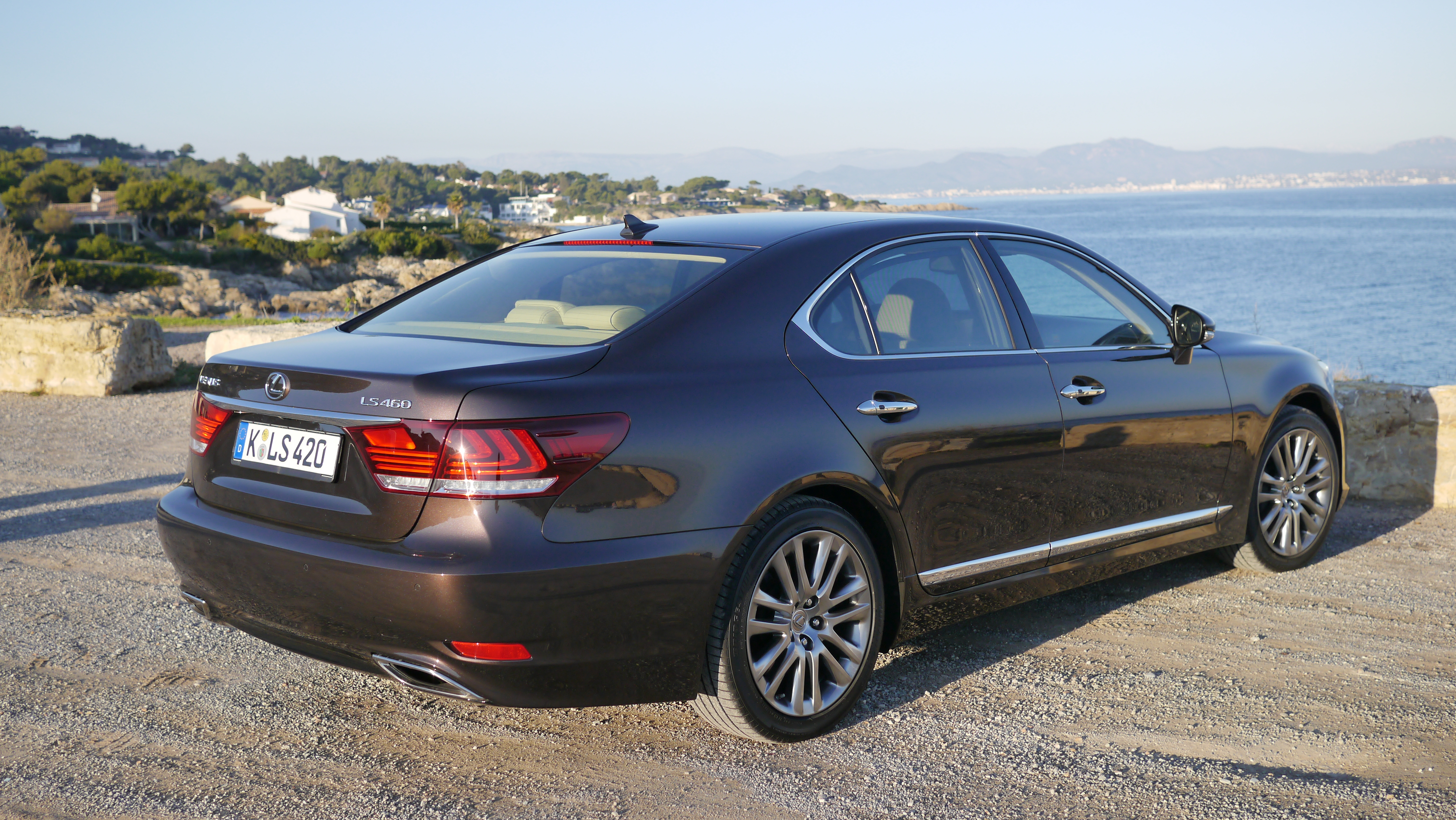
2013 Lexus LS 460 (USF40; Europe)

== Variants ==
=== USF40 / USF41 (2006) ===
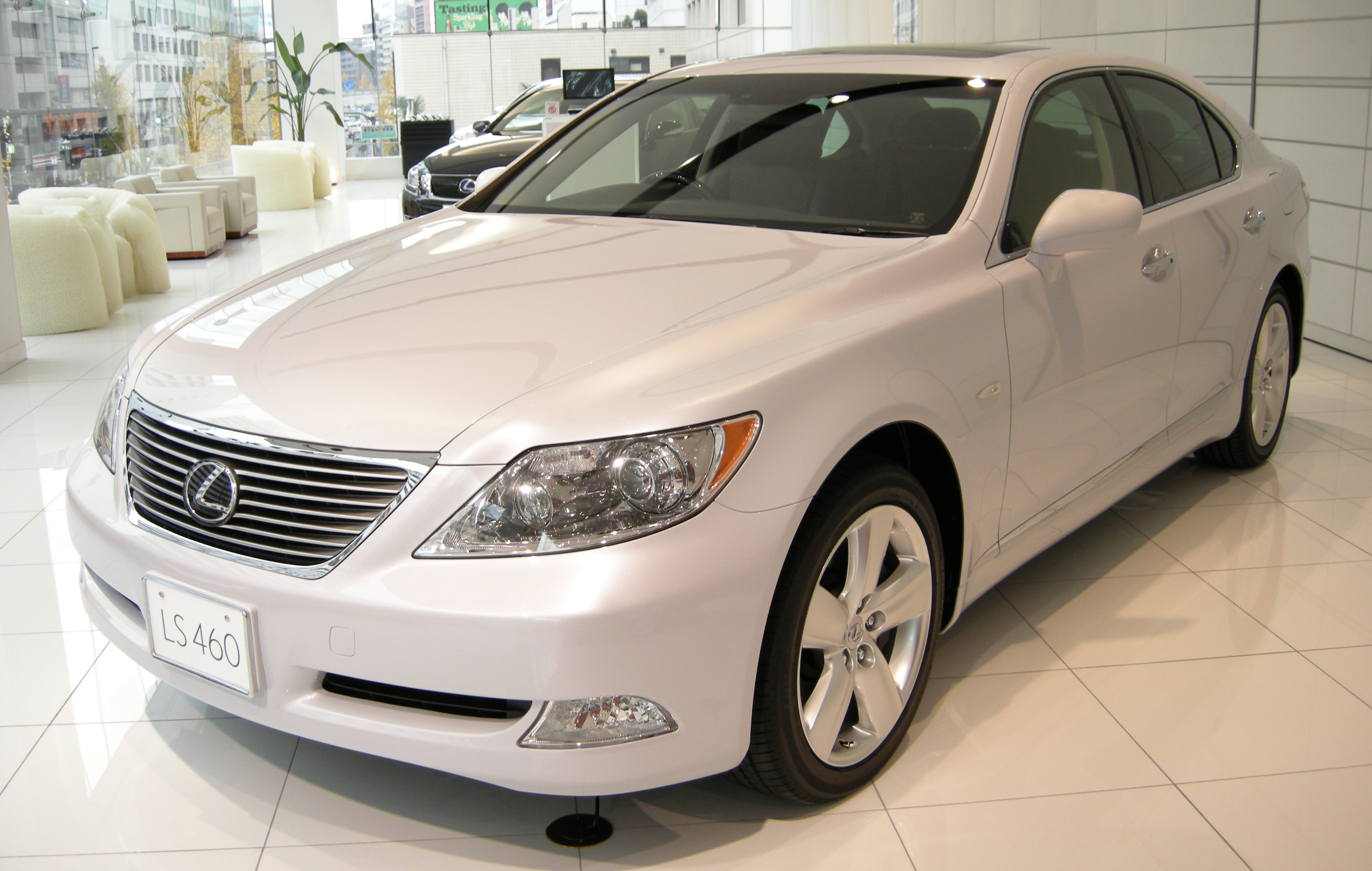

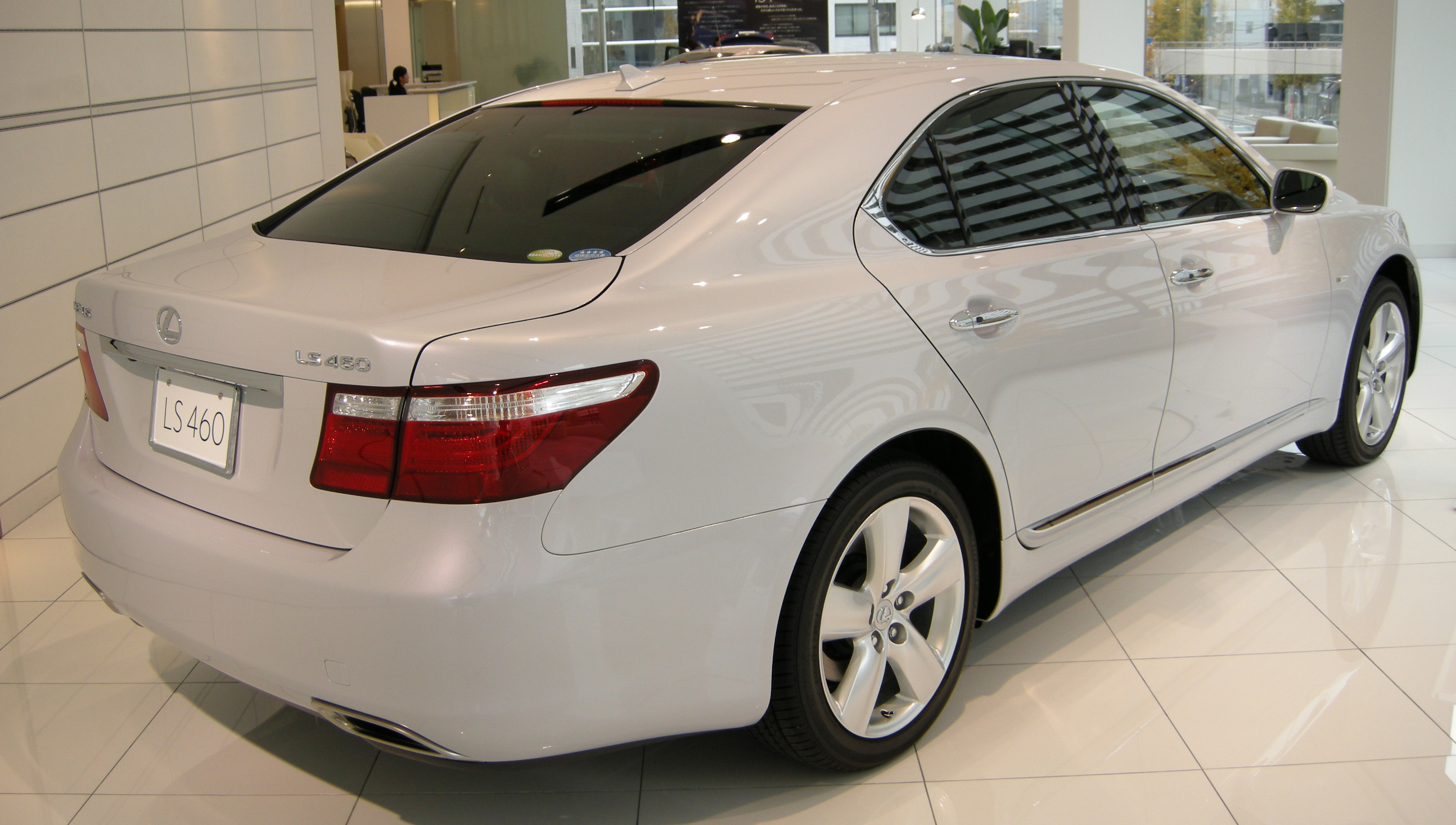
2006–2009 Lexus LS 460 (USF40; Japan)

Introduced at the 2006 North American International Auto Show, the redesigned LS was based on the LF-Sh concept vehicle and used an all-new platform. The initial models, the LS 460 (USF40) and long wheelbase LS 460 L (USF41), featured a new 4.6 L 1UR-FSE V8 producing 283 kW (380 hp; 385 PS) and 498 N⋅m (367 lb⋅ft) of torque. The LS 460 introduced the first production eight-speed automatic transmission and an automatic parking system.

The LS 460 and LS 460 L first went on sale in Japan on 19 September 2006. It was the first time the car was sold under the Lexus marque in Japan, and identified the next phase of Lexus' launch as a global premium brand. Its exclusivity is shared with the Toyota Century and the Toyota Crown Majesta, which are only sold at dedicated Toyota Japanese dealerships called Toyota Store.

The LS 460 and LS 460 L arrived at dealerships in the United States on 20 October 2006. Sales of the LS 460 began in Europe in late 2006. In early 2007, the redesigned Lexus LS reached the Middle East and other Asian countries. The LS 460 arrived in Australia in mid-2007. The U.S. launch of the 2007 Lexus LS model was accompanied by special presentations at "460 Degrees" art galleries in Beverly Hills, Chicago, Miami, and New York City, and an outdoor vehicle art display at the World Financial Center in downtown Manhattan.

The previous double-wishbone front suspension was replaced with a dual joint multilink design, with an all-electric system. To increase rigidity and lower unsprung weight, forged aluminum was used for the suspension links, front steering knuckles, and rear hub carriers. along with a single-piece hollow die-cast aluminum front subframe with machined mounting points, and approximately half of the body used high-tensile steel. Overall the amount of laser welding was doubled compared to the previous model.

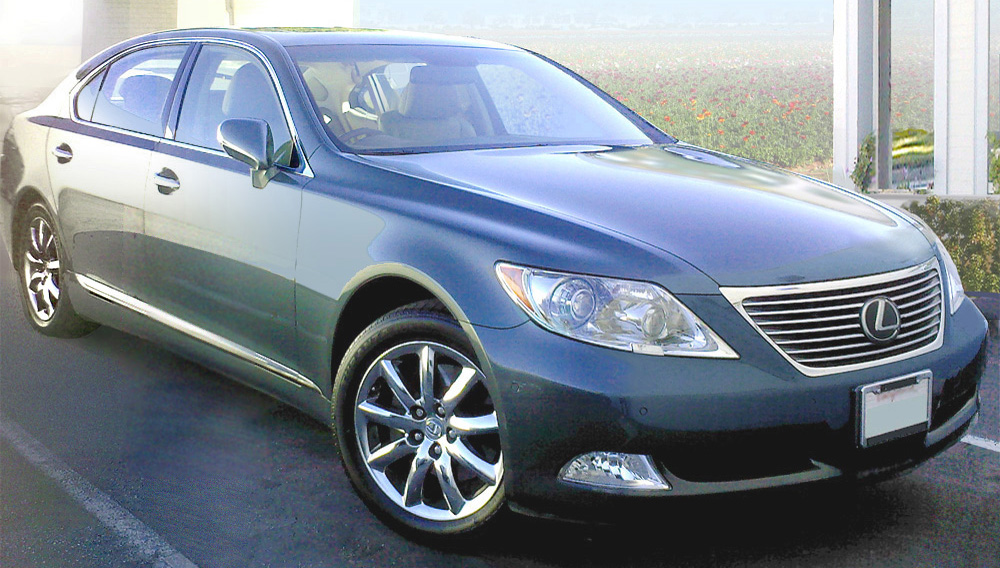
2006–2009 Lexus LS 460 L (USF41; U.S.)

The LS 460 L, the debut vehicle of the LS line at the 2006 North American International Auto Show, sported an added 121.9 mm (4.8 in) of length, affording passengers a more capacious rear compartment, and added features. Standard amenities on the LS 460 L (some optional on the LS 460) included a power open/close trunk, heated steering wheel, backup camera, navigation system, XM NavTraffic in the U.S., Bluetooth, semi-aniline leather interior, and heated/cooled power memory rear seats. The LS 460 L offered the Variable Gear Ratio Steering (VGRS) and the Adaptive Variable Suspension performance upgrades; the air suspension features normal, comfort, and sport modes. Compared to the standard wheelbase LS 460, the LS 460 L added up to 113 kg (250 lb) of weight while still matching the 0–97 km/h (60 mph) acceleration of its lighter stablemate, listed at 5.4 seconds. The "Executive Class Four-Seat Package" with massaging rear seat was an option for chauffeured customers.

=== UVF45 / UVF46 (2007) ===
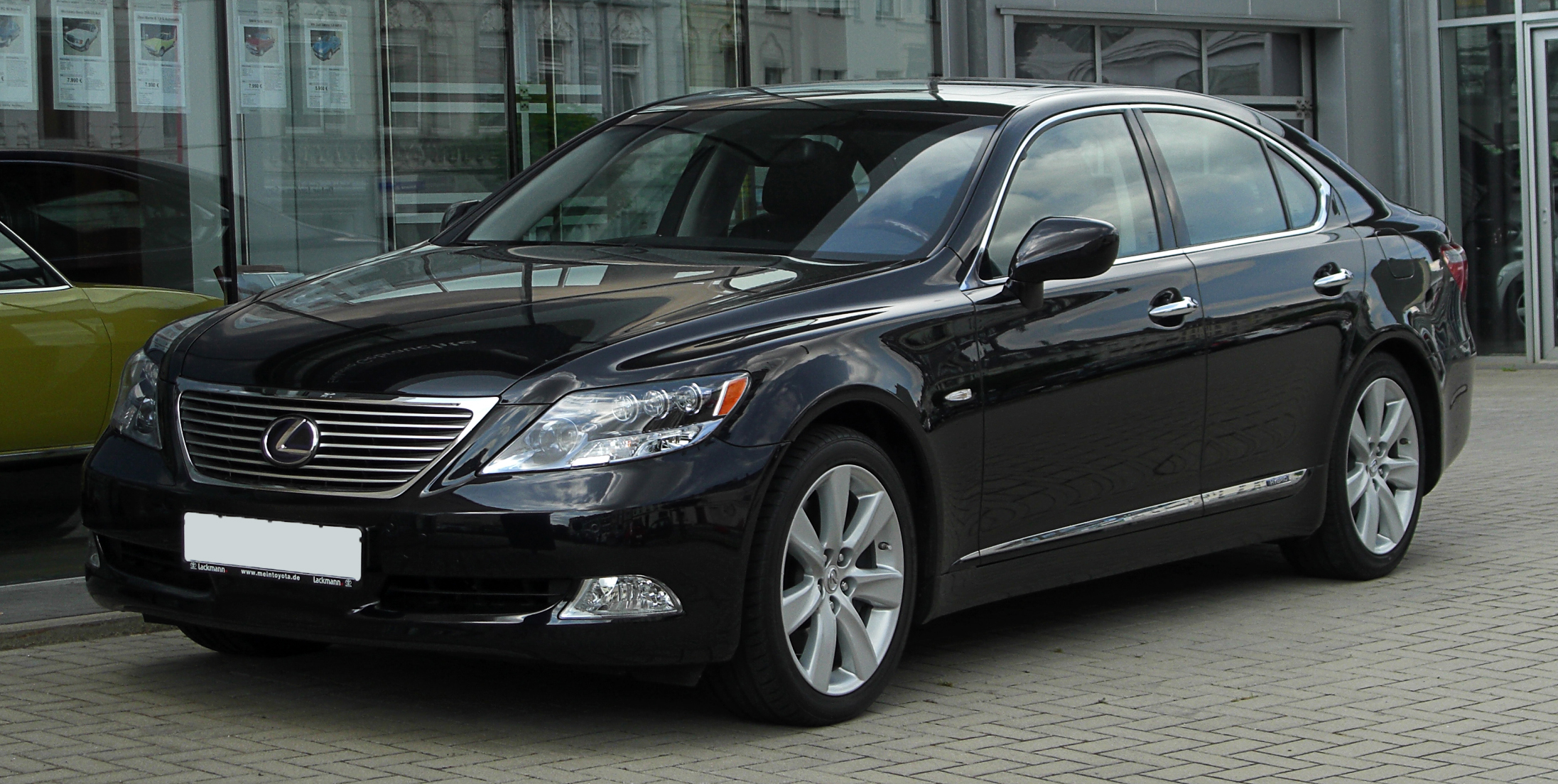

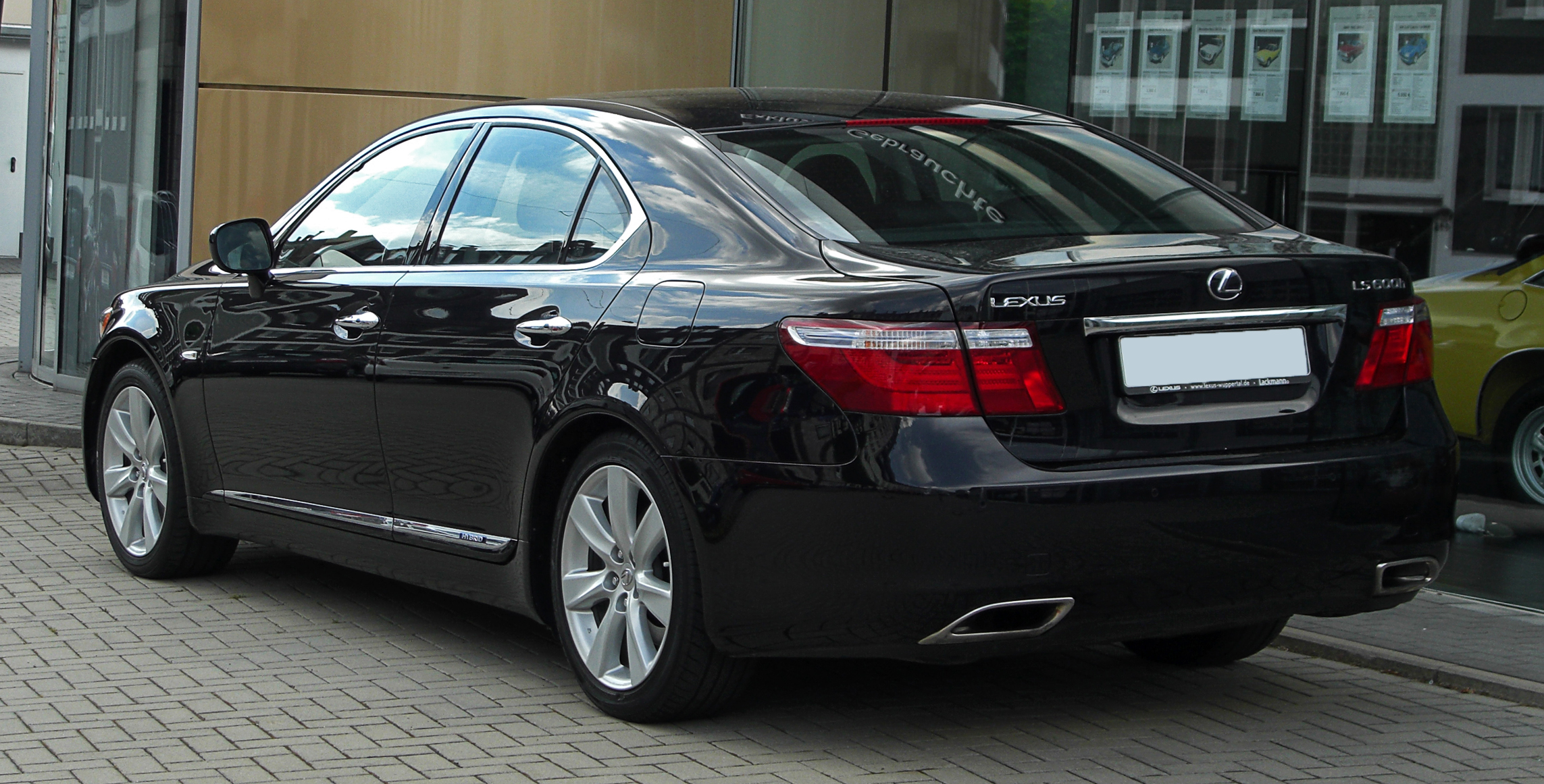
2006–2009 Lexus LS 600h (UVF45; Germany)

Launched at the New York International Auto Show in April 2006, the LS 600h L (UVF46) was the first production V8-powered full-hybrid vehicle. The LS 600h (UVF45), a standard wheelbase version destined for Asia and Europe, was launched in Japan in May 2007. Both models are equipped with Lexus Hybrid Drive, featuring a 5.0 L 2UR-FSE V8 engine mated to two electric motors with nickel-metal hydride battery packs. The first motor has two primary functions, starting the gasoline engine and charging both the second motor and the nickel-metal hydride battery; the second motor is a high-output generator capable of 165 kW (221 hp; 224 PS) alone. The entire system generates an output of 327 kW (439 hp; 445 PS). This total figure does not combine the V8 engine and the electric motor standalone power figures. The powertrain uses a two-stage L110F continuously variable transmission, featuring a three-mode power switch for control of torque output between hybrid (normal), power, or snow modes; an additional EV mode allows for silent driving under full electric power.

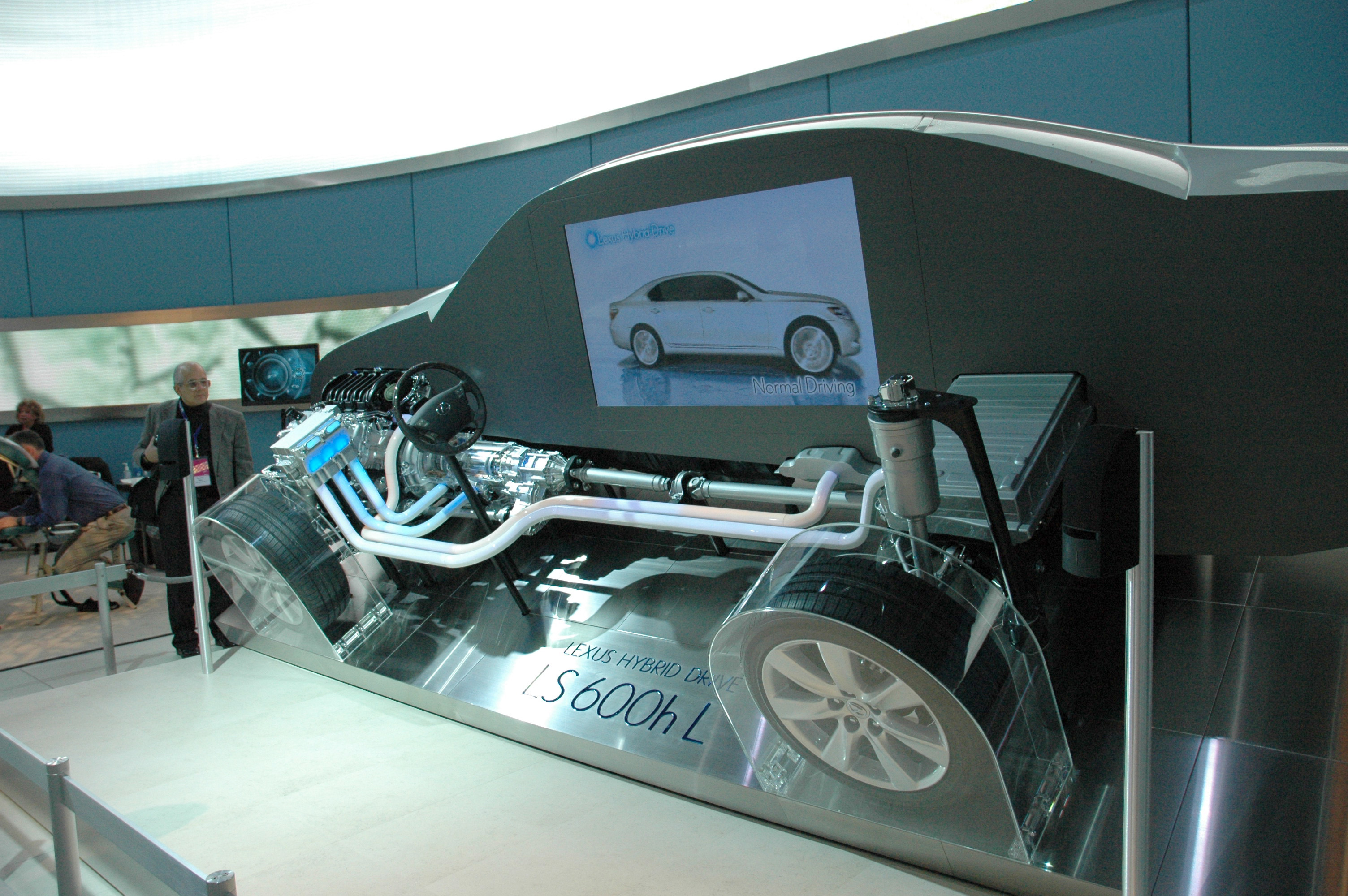
UVF46 LS 600h L Lexus Hybrid Drive display model.

According to tests by the Environmental Protection Agency (EPA) and on the European combined cycle, fuel economy is slightly higher overall than the lower-powered non-hybrid LS; the LS 600h L also receives a U.S. Super Ultra Low Emission Vehicle (SULEV) rating. European emissions standards testing has listed the LS 600h L's CO_{2} emissions at 219g/km, and the vehicle is listed under the United Kingdom's Vehicle Excise Duty tax band F. According to EPA testing, the LS 600h L earns an energy impact score of 16.3 barrels of petroleum gasoline per year, with a carbon footprint of 8.7 tons of CO_{2} emitted per year. Japanese drivers pay the top level road tax, the same amount that Toyota Century owners pay.

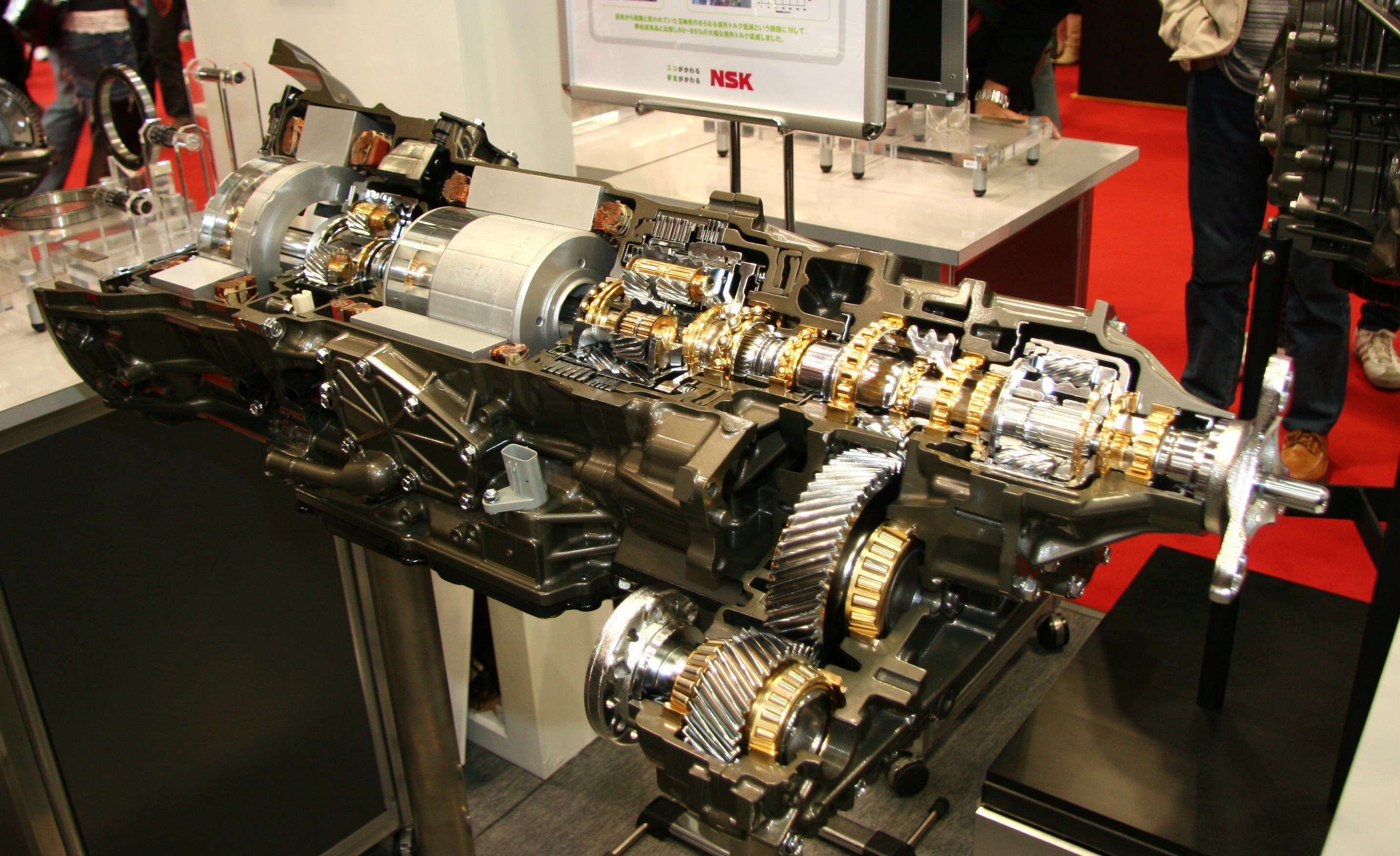
The continuously variable transmission fitted to the LS 600h/600h L

Standard equipment on the LS hybrids included all-wheel drive, a Torsen limited-slip differential, and an Adaptive Variable Air Suspension, plus an optional Active Stabilizer Suspension System (an upgrade to the standard multi-link front suspension expressly developed for the LS hybrids). Hybrid-only features included the first production low beam LED headlights in the U.S. market, a leather-trimmed dash, and blue-tinted badging; the standard SmartAccess key fob can also be substituted with a 3.35 mm (0.132 in) thick wallet-sized "smart card". Designers visited Beverly Hills, California and South Florida as part of the LS hybrid development process. To reduce noise, vibration, and harshness, the transmission gear teeth and engagement points were finished to within micrometres, a sound-absorbing cover was employed, and acoustic analysis was performed to evaluate noise emissions.

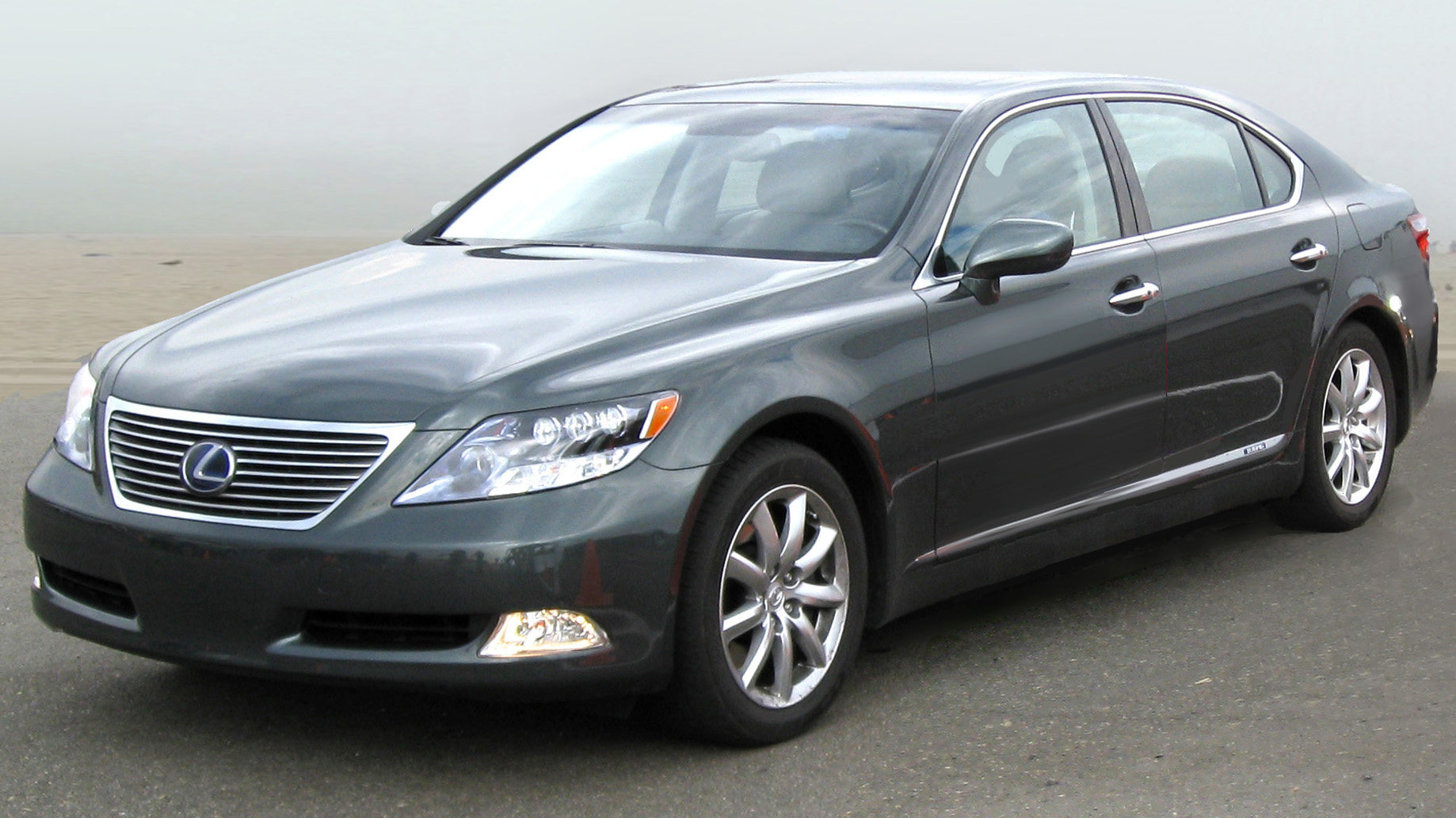
2007–2009 Lexus LS 600h L (UVF46; U.S.)

Aiming to compete with top-specification versions of rival luxury sedans, designers billed the LS hybrids as having "the performance of a V12, but the efficiencies of a V8", opting for the hybrid approach to meet performance, fuel efficiency, and emission targets. The LS 600h L, based on the long-wheelbase LS 460 L introduced with the new LS 460 platform, aimed to compete with the Audi A8 L W12, BMW 760Li, and Mercedes-Benz S 600, whose prices approach or exceed US$120,000. This market featured separate engineering and engine designs for added power, with the most common powerplant being a 12-cylinder engine. After its press debut, the LS 600h L's price was speculated to be higher than any previous Lexus, and in April 2007, Lexus announced that the base price for the LS 600h L would be over US$104,000, surpassing the V12-equipped Toyota Century as the most expensive Japanese flagship sedan ever produced. With a price reaching six figures, the LS 600h L placed a Lexus vehicle in the U.S. "ultra-luxury" segment for the first time.

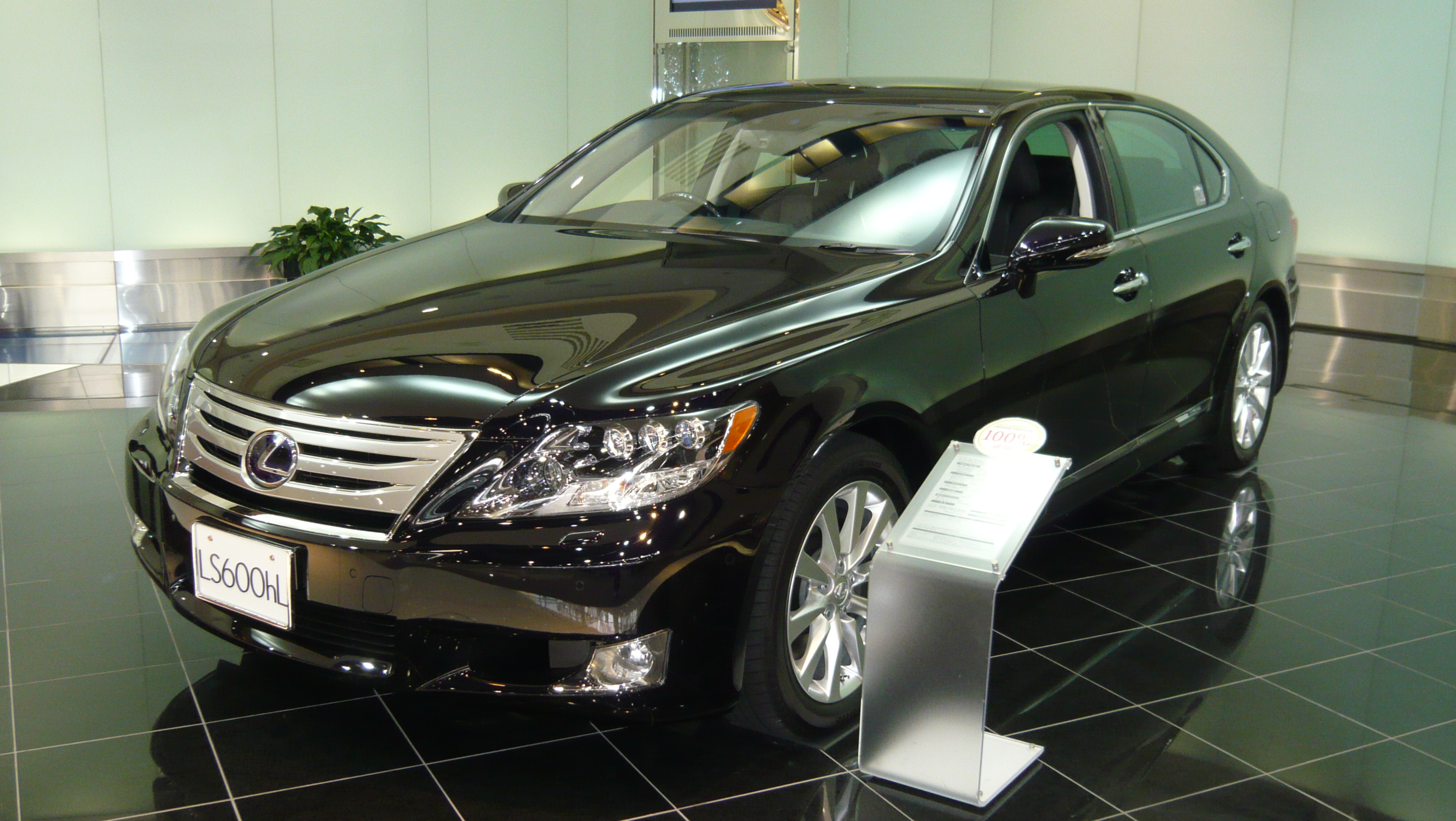
2010 Lexus LS 600h L (UVF46; Japan)

By March 2007, the initial allocation of LS hybrids in the U.S. was nearly sold out, with 1,850 preorders placed months before debut. As of October 2007, Lexus sold 6,093 LS 600h's worldwide. When the LS hybrid originally went on sale in July 2007, Lexus initially targeted 7,000 total units worldwide for the first year, and 2,000 annually in other markets. Ward's Auto and other media outlets reported that the Lexus LS 600h first year's (2007) allocation was entirely sold out and that there was a one-year backorder as a result. Positioned as the halo vehicles of the LS line, the LS 600h and LS 600h L saw corporate purchases for emissions reductions, along with use as an official state car. In 2008, a redesign of the rear battery area increased trunk space by 20%.

=== USF45 / USF46 (2008) ===
All-wheel drive, specifically the LS 460 AWD (USF45) and LS 460 L AWD (USF46), was added to non-hybrid models in 2008 for the 2009 model year with the addition of front passenger memory function.

== Limited editions ==
=== Neiman Marcus ===
Specialty department store Neiman Marcus offered 100 individually numbered LS 600h L "Launch Edition" sedans for early 2007, available only through the Neiman Marcus catalog for InCircle members. These special models came in an exclusive Truffle Mica color with Alabaster interior, with chrome wheels and a customized Italian leather luggage set. The limited units were symbolically chosen to coincide with Neiman Marcus' centennial anniversary.

=== Pebble Beach ===
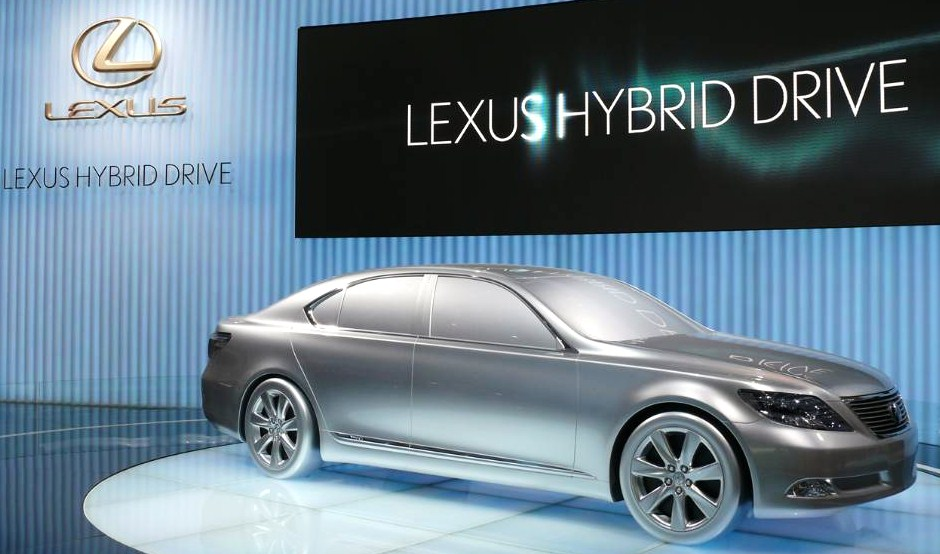
LS 600h Invisible Garden at the 2007 Internationale Automobil-Ausstellung.

For the 2009 model year, the LS 600h L was produced in a 50-unit "Pebble Beach Edition" in partnership with the Pebble Beach Company, operator of the namesake California golf courses and resorts. These vehicles featured Pebble Beach badging and tags, a two-tone interior, and the choice of a travel or merchandise package. The special edition was first shown at the 2008 Pebble Beach Concours d'Elegance.

=== Salone del Mobile ===
The 2006 Salone del Mobile (Milan Design Week) exhibition at the Museo della Permanente in Milan, Italy, featured an LS 460 art model with a sculpted body along with a fiber-optic "Evolving Fiber" landscape. At 2007's Salone del Mobile, Lexus presented an "Invisible Garden" exhibition at the city's Zona Tortona featuring a frosted LS 600h hybrid model. The model was later shown at the Salon International de l'Auto (Geneva Motor Show).

=== LS 600h L Landaulet ===
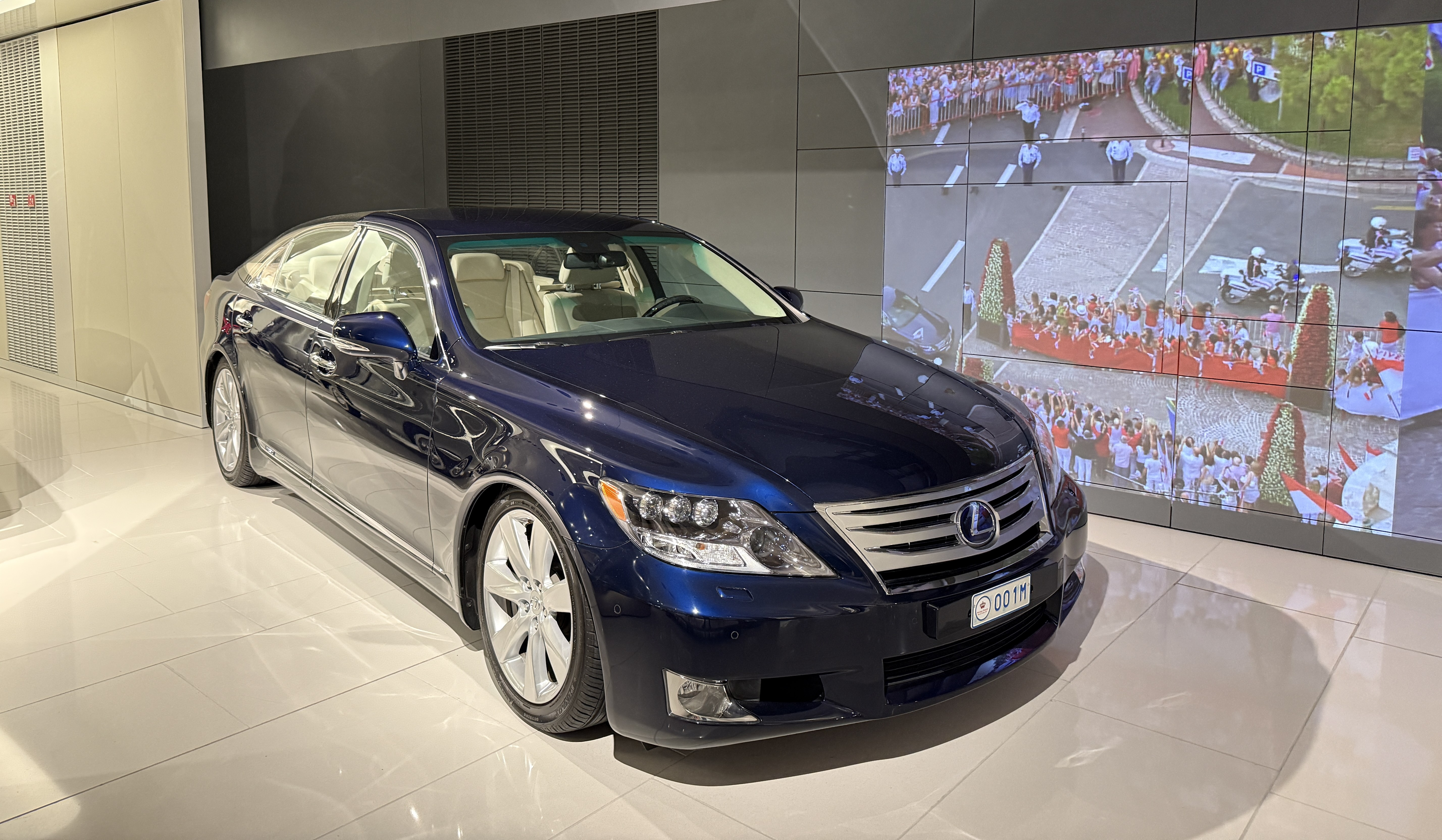
The LS 600h L Landaulet, on display at La Collection de voitures de S.A.S Le Prince de Monaco.

In 2011, an LS 600h L was converted to landaulet configuration for use at the wedding of Albert II, Prince of Monaco, and Charlene Wittstock. The conversion was handled by Belgian coachmaker Carat Duchatelet in collaboration with Lexus. The LS 600h L Landaulet's rear cabin featured a transparent bubble roof with no additional reinforcement, and the vehicle received a bespoke, water-based blue livery. The car was used to transport the royal couple on the day of their wedding, and afterwards put on display at the Oceanographic Museum in Monaco.

== Concept models ==
=== LF-Sh ===
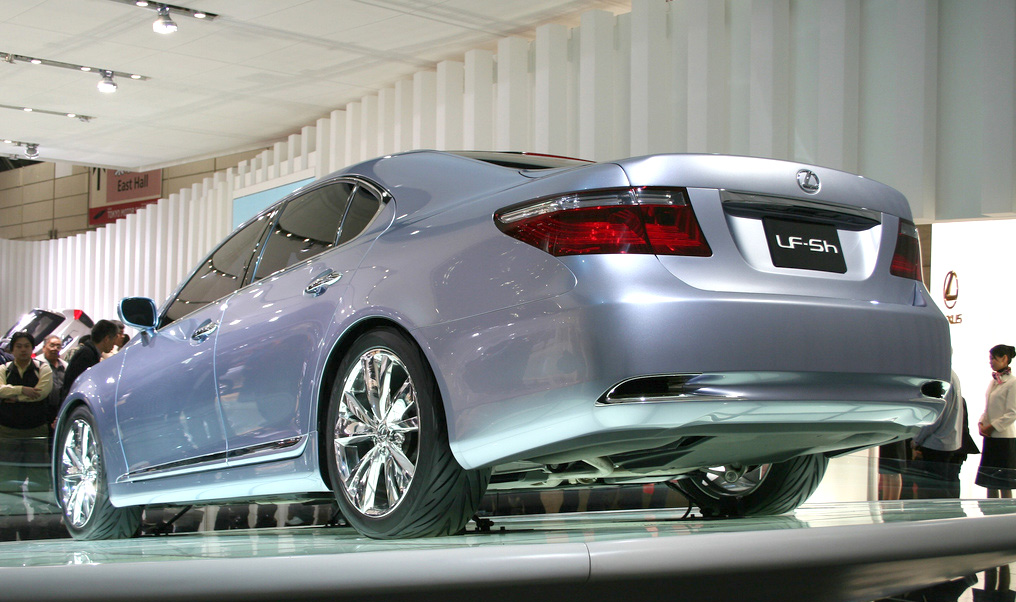
The Lexus LF-Sh at the 2005 Tokyo Motor Show.

The Lexus LF-Sh concept previewed the appearance of the fourth generation USF40/USF41 design of the Lexus LS. This concept vehicle debuted at the 2005 Tokyo Motor Show. The designation refers to Lexus Future-Sedan hybrid, and the vehicle took the form of a hybrid standard wheelbase sedan model with all-wheel drive, LED headlamps, and integrated exhaust tips. No interior was shown. Lexus subsequently debuted a production hybrid powertrain and all-wheel drive with the LS 600h/LS 600h L.

=== Driving simulator ===
A specialized Lexus LS 460 is used in a warehouse-sized driving simulator at Toyota's Higashifuji Technical Center in Shizuoka, Japan. This vehicle is mounted inside a 4.5 by 7.0 m (14.8 by 23.0 ft) high dome, and surrounded by a 360° projector screen. This setup is used to simulate the audiovisual and vibration aspects of driving.

Simulator data is directly transmitted to a strut/track-mounted driver occupant dome containing the forward cabin of an LS 460, creating the impression of forward movement in a three-dimensional environment. The occupant dome further simulates vehicle motion. The driving simulator is used for testing and development of automotive safety features in a secure environment.

=== LS 460 ITS-Safety ===
For the Intelligent Transport Systems (ITS-Safety) 2010 exhibition at the Miraikan museum in Tokyo, the LS 460 ITS-Safety concept was shown. The ITS-Safety concept included road-to-vehicle and vehicle-to-vehicle information-exchange technologies. The LS 460 ITS-Safety concept was equipped with radar cruise control and automatic parking driver-assist systems.

=== LS TMG ===
In September 2011, photos were taken of a heavily modified LS, later revealed to be the LS TMG (Toyota Motorsport GmbH) prototype spotted on the Nürburgring. Aside from a redesigned aero package, the LS TMG contains a 5.0-liter V8 engine that produces 478 kW (641 hp; 650 PS) and 710 N⋅m (524 lb⋅ft) of torque, giving the car a top speed of around 320 km/h (200 mph) and a 4.2-second 0–97 km/h (60 mph) time.

== Specifications ==
Different models based on the standard (USF40) and long wheelbase (USF41) platforms were sold worldwide. From 2007, rear-wheel drive was offered with the 4.6 L gasoline powered V8, and all-wheel drive was featured with the 5.0 L hybrid V8. Some markets received a modified 4.6 L V8 engine without direct injection. The standard (UVF45) and long wheelbase (UVF46) hybrid models featured a two-stage planetary-gear continuously variable transmission (CVT). The LS 600h L was sold in major global markets in North America, Asia, and Europe, while the LS 600h was sold in Asian and European markets.

Production model variants by region
Chassis code	Model no.	Production years	Drivetrain	Transmission	Engine type	Engine code	Region(s)
USF40	LS 460	2006–2017	RWD	8-speed AA80E AT	4.6 L petrol V8	1UR-FSE	N. America, Asia, Europe, Oceania
USF40	LS 460	2006–2017	RWD	8-speed AA80E AT	4.6 L petrol V8	1UR-FE	Middle East
USF41	LS 460 L	2006–2017	RWD	8-speed AA80E AT	4.6 L petrol V8	1UR-FSE	N. America, Asia, Europe
USF41	LS 460 L	2006–2017	RWD	8-speed AA80E AT	4.6 L petrol V8	1UR-FE	Middle East
USF45	LS 460 AWD	2007–2017	AWD	8-speed AA80F AT	4.6 L petrol V8	1UR-FSE	N. America
USF46	LS 460 L AWD	2007–2017	AWD	8-speed AA80F AT	4.6 L petrol V8	1UR-FSE	N. America
UVF45	LS 600h	2007–2017	AWD	L110F series-parallel hybrid power split device with 2 speed reduction	5.0 L hybrid V8	2UR-FSE	Asia, Europe
UVF46	LS 600h L	2007–2017	AWD	L110F series-parallel hybrid power split device with 2 speed reduction	5.0 L hybrid V8	2UR-FSE	N. America, Asia, Europe, Oceania

Performance specifications by model
	LS 460	LS 460 L	LS 460 AWD	LS 460 L AWD	LS 600h AWD	LS 600h L AWD
Engine type	V8-petrol				V8-petrol/hybrid	
Displacement	4,608 cc (4.6 L)				4,969 cc (5.0 L)	
Power	283 kW (385 PS; 380 hp) at 6,400 rpm		266 kW (362 PS; 357 hp) at 6,400 rpm		327 kW (445 PS; 439 hp) at 6,400 rpm	
Torque	498 N⋅m (367 lb⋅ft) at 4,100 rpm		466 N⋅m (344 lb⋅ft) at 4,100 rpm		520 N⋅m (385 lb⋅ft) at 4,000 rpm	
Top speed	250 km/h (155 mph) (electronically limited)					
Acceleration 0–100 km/h (62 mph)	5.7 seconds		6.3 seconds			
Fuel consumption	11.1 L/100 km (21.2 mpg_{‑US}; 25.4 mpg_{‑imp})		11.6 L/100 km (20.3 mpg_{‑US}; 24.4 mpg_{‑imp})		9.3 L/100 km (25.3 mpg_{‑US}; 30.4 mpg_{‑imp})	
CO_{2} emissions	261 g/km (14.8 oz/mi)		274 g/km (15.6 oz/mi)		219 g/km (12.4 oz/mi)	

== Awards ==
At the 2007 New York International Auto Show, the LS 460 received the World Car of the Year award, selected by automotive journalists from twenty-two countries. The panel commented that the LS was "the embodiment of the Lexus brand's 'pursuit of perfection.'" Other awards include International Car of the Year (2007 ICOTY), Japan Car of the Year (2006–2007 JCOTY), and the Society of Automotive Engineers (SAE) 2007 "Best Engineered Vehicle" award. In 2007, the LS 460 was named Luxury Car of the Year at the North American International Auto Show and was selected as the Best Luxury Car at the Fleet World Honours. Notable awards won by the LS 600h include Top Gear's Limo of the Year (2006), Fleet World Honours' Best Luxury Car (2007, 2008), World's Most Beautiful Automobile (Limousine category), L'Automobile più Bella del Mondo awards (2007), Japanesque Modern Awards List, MotorWeek Best Dream Machine (2008), and Chauffeur Car of the Year (2008). The LS 600h L has also received the Canadian Automobile Association's CAA Pyramid Award for Safety Innovation, and has been named to Forbes' list of the Top Ten Least-Polluting Luxury Cars.

== Bibliography ==
- Dawson, Chester (2004). Lexus: The Relentless Pursuit. Singapore: John Wiley & Sons (Asia) Pty Ltd. ISBN 978-0-470-82110-7.
- May, Matthew E. (2006). The Elegant Solution: Toyota's Formula for Mastering Innovation. New York: Free Press. ISBN 0-7432-9017-8.
