= Hellenic Republics =

Hellenic Republic may refer to one of several republican periods in Greece's modern constitutional history:

- First Hellenic Republic, the provisional Greek state from 1827 to 1832 during the Greek Revolution
- Second Hellenic Republic, the Greek state from 1924 until 1935
- Third Hellenic Republic, the Greek state from 1974 onwards

== See also ==
- Hellenic state
- Hellas (disambiguation)
- Greek democracy
