= Lexus GS (S190) =

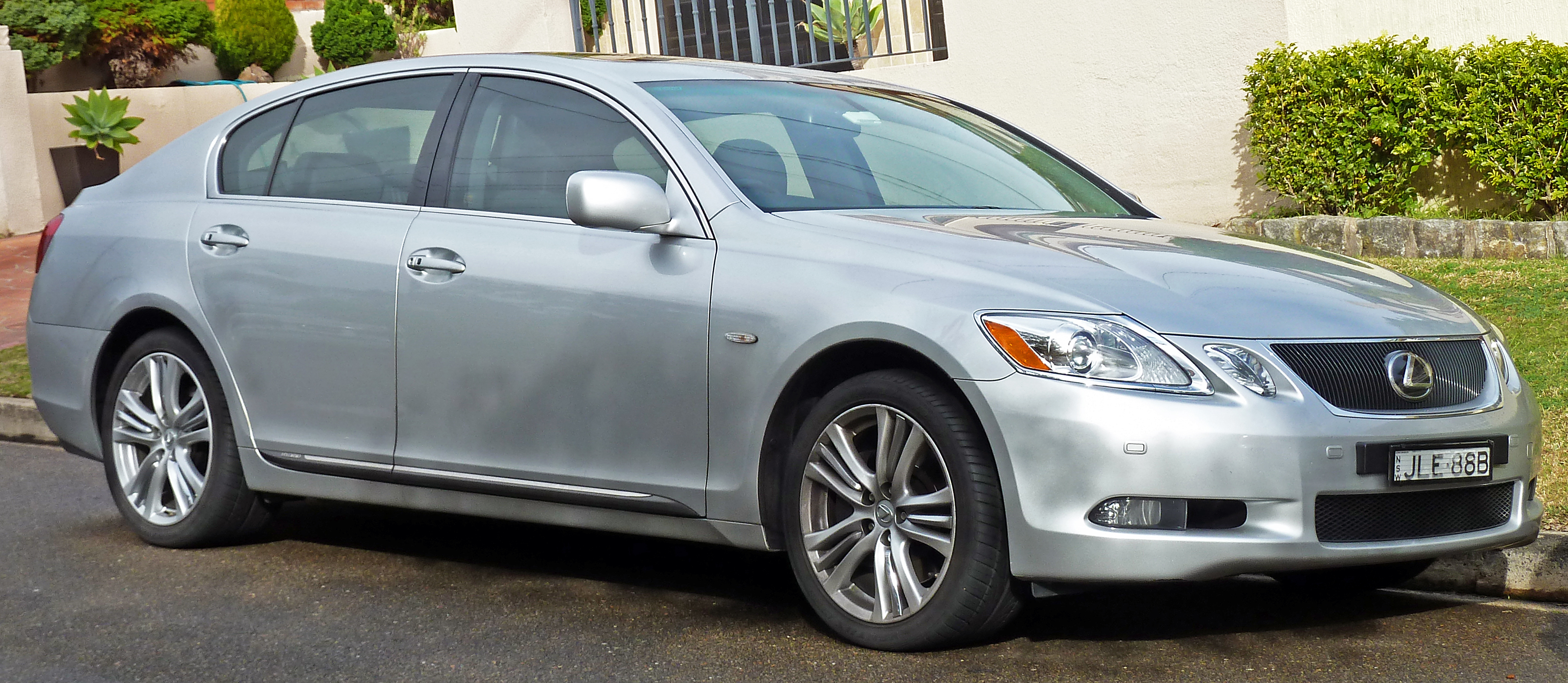

Overview
- Manufacturer: Toyota
- Production: January 2005 – December 2011
- Assembly: Japan: Tahara, Aichi (Tahara plant)
- Designer: Yasuhide Hosoda, Isoroku Yamada and Sotiris Kovos (2002)

Body and chassis
- Class: Executive car (E)
- Body style: 4-door sedan
- Layout: Front-engine, rear-wheel drive; Front-engine, all-wheel drive
- Platform: Toyota N platform
- Related: Toyota Crown (S180); Toyota Crown (S200); Toyota Crown Majesta (S180); Toyota Crown Majesta (S200)

Powertrain
- Engine: 3.0 L 3GR-FSE V6 (gasoline); 3.5 L 2GR-FSE V6 (gasoline/hybrid); 4.3 L 3UZ-FE V8 (gasoline); 4.6 L 1UR-FE V8 (gasoline) (Middle east); 4.6L 1UR-FSE V8 (gasoline)
- Transmission: 6-speed A760H/1E automatic; 6-speed A960E automatic; 8-speed AA80E automatic; CVT

Dimensions
- Wheelbase: 2,850 mm (112.2 in)
- Length: 2005-2009: 4,826 mm (190.0 in); 2009-2011: 4,844 mm (190.7 in)
- Width: 1,821 mm (71.7 in)
- Height: RWD: 1,425 mm (56.1 in); AWD: 1,435 mm (56.5 in)

Chronology
- Predecessor: Lexus GS (S160)
- Successor: Lexus GS (L10)

The Lexus GS (S190) is the third generation of the Lexus GS line of executive cars. Sold by Lexus from 2005 to 2011, the line includes multiple V6, V8, and hybrid models. A concept model for the GS line, the LF-S, debuted in late 2003 at the Tokyo Motor Show. The third generation GS first appeared as a pre-production vehicle at the 2004 North American International Auto Show in Detroit with the production version being shown a year later at the 2005 show. The initial lineup featured V6 and V8 engines with rear-wheel drive, and for the first time on a Lexus sedan, the option of all-wheel drive with the V6-powered GS 300 and GS 350 models. The GS 450h performance hybrid joined the lineup in 2006.

The production GS was built on a newly designed mid-size platform which would also be used on the second-generation IS. Production of the third generation began on 24 January 2005 in the city of Tahara, Aichi, in Japan, where all GS models would be built. The third generation GS was also the first model to feature Lexus' own L-finesse styling upon its introduction.

== History of development ==
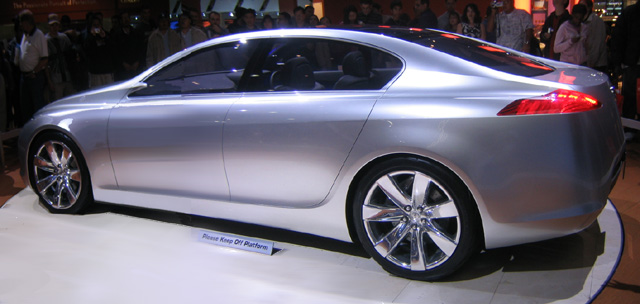
The Lexus LF-S concept at the 2005 Los Angeles Auto show.

=== Concept ===
In October 2003, Lexus premiered the LF-S (Lexus Future Sedan), a concept car which presaged the design characteristics of the upcoming GS. The design features on the LF-S concept included a slingshot cabin, sleek profile, and fastback rear deck lid, which were translated to the production GS, while the windshield cleansing system, glass roof, and side cameras were not.

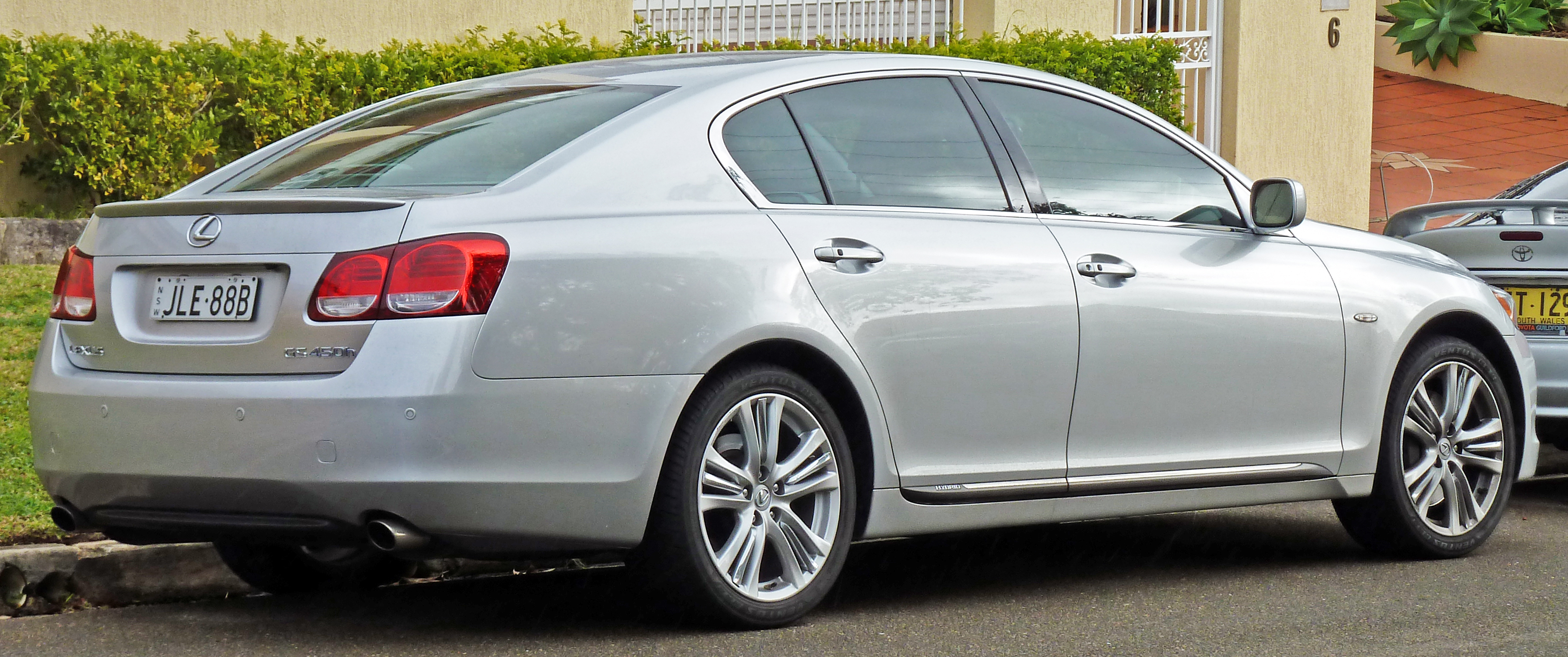
2006–2009 Lexus GS 450h (GWS191R; Australia)

=== Exterior ===
In 1999, development commenced on a successor to the S160 under chief engineer, Shigetoshi Miyoshi. Styling for both the exterior and interior was done under lead designer Yasuhide Hosoda between 2000 and 2002, during which L-finesse came to fruition in 2001. By 2002, a design was finalized, to be introduced the following year.

The third generation GS was the introductory Lexus model for the marque's new L-finesse design philosophy. Characterized by swooping lines, a fastback profile, and more muscular styling, the GS indicated the future direction of the Lexus lineup. The production GS featured a slingshot cabin, first previewed on the earlier Lexus LF-S concept. The production GS also retained the quad headlamp design from the second generation model and previous Lexus SC while adding LED tailamps, and one-piece bumpers to create a more uniform appearance. The drag coefficient on the third generation GS design reached 0.27 C_{d}.

=== Interior ===
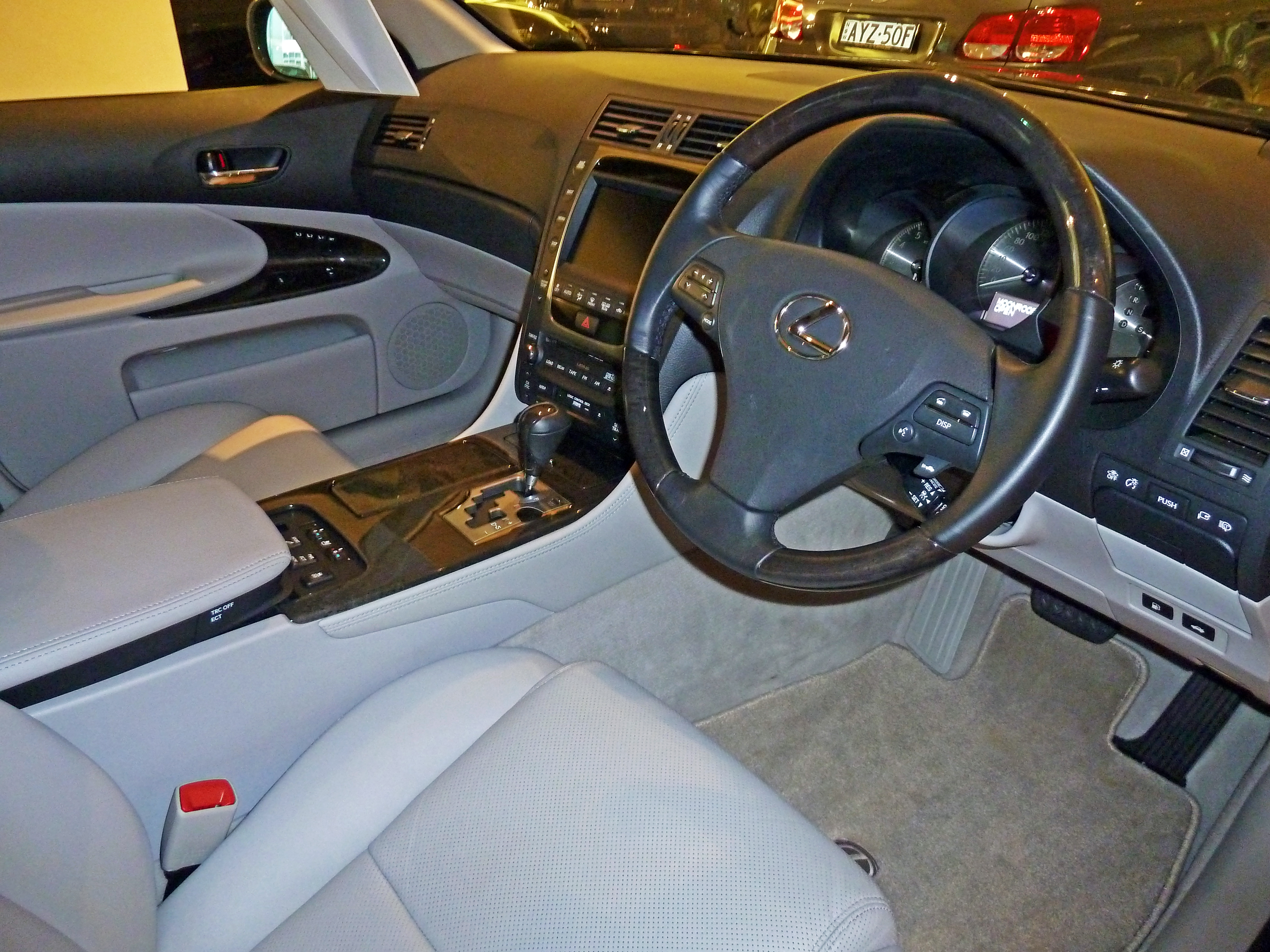
Third generation GS interior (GRS190R)

The GS interior was available with ash leather and black Bird's eye maple wood trim, cashmere leather and brown bird's-eye maple trim, or black leather and walnut trim. Major standard features included a water repellent front door glass, an acoustic windshield, solar energy absorbing glass, electrochromic auto-dimming side mirrors with puddle lamps, electrochromic auto-dimming rearview mirror, 10-way driver and front passenger power and heated seats with three-position Lexus Memory System, power tilt/telescoping steering wheel, and a power trunk closer. The GS sedans also were the first to feature the latest generation of Lexus' SmartAccess keyless system–-adding a push-button start for the first time as standard.

Other unique features included a driver-side hidden drop-down panel for infrequently used controls, a standard 7-inch touchscreen display in the center console, and LED lighting in the cabin. Unique to the Lexus GS series was a three-pod instrument cluster with machined aluminum facings and an electrochromic feature which adjusts for the amount of reflected sunlight to reduce glare. Optional features included a power moonroof, ventilated front seats with perforated leather, power rear sunshade, rain-sensing wipers, a discrete 5.1 surround sound 14-speaker 330 watt Mark Levinson premium sound system, XM-satellite radio and DVD-based navigation with backup camera and Bluetooth technology.

=== Safety systems ===
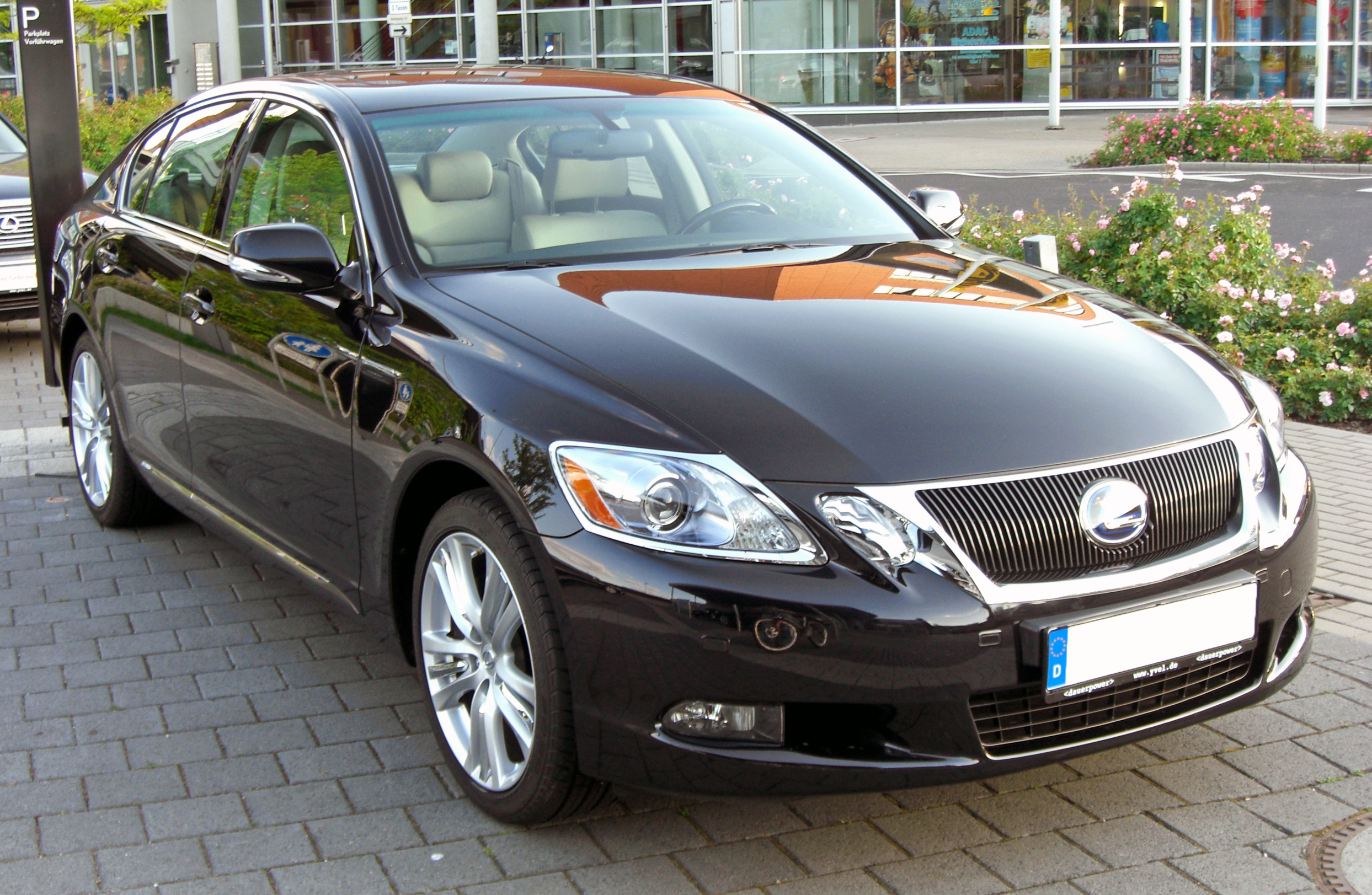
GS 460 equipped with Pre-Collision radar system with grille sensor

The third generation Lexus GS came standard with dual front airbags, front driver and passenger knee airbags, front and rear row side curtain airbags, and front row side torso airbags standard while rear row side torso airbags were optional. An Adaptive Front-lighting System (AFS) was standard on the V8 model while optional on the V6 model. The radar-based Pre-Collision System (PCS) with a Dynamic Radar Cruise Control system was optional. PCS can automatically apply up to 0.3g of deceleration if the driver does not react to imminent crash warnings. Anti-lock braking, electronic brakeforce distribution, brake assist and Vehicle Stability Control (VSC) are standard on all models. VSC with the electric power steering system can immediately alter steering torque assist during evasive maneuvers.

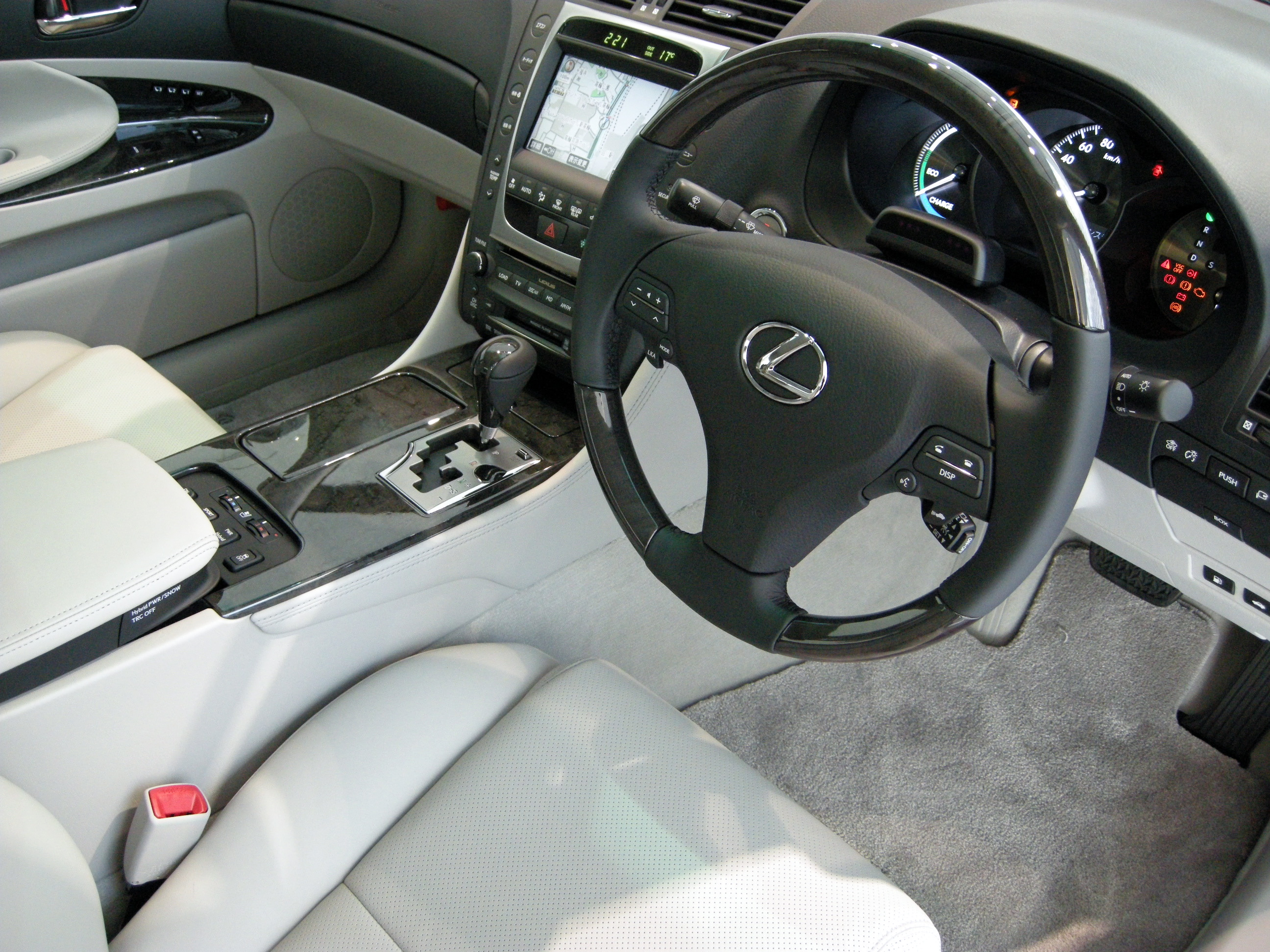
GS 450h interior equipped with Driver Monitoring System

Vehicle Dynamics Integrated Management (VDIM) is standard on the GS 430/460/450h models and coupled to VGRS it can alter steering gear ratios. VDIM became standard on the 2008 GS 350 but does not include the VGRS system. The GS 450h was among the first Lexus vehicles to receive the Driver Monitoring System in certain markets. This safety system featured an infrared steering wheel mounted camera which monitors driver attentiveness, sounding an alarm if danger ahead is detected and the driver is not paying attention.

In Insurance Institute for Highway Safety (IIHS) tests the GS received the "Good" overall rating in both frontal and side impact tests. The GS also received the "Good" rating in 13 of the 14 measured categories. However, the 2006 through 2011 model GS achieved only an "Acceptable" rating in the IIHS for rollover tests, along with the Audi A6; competitors from later years, as well as the succeeding 2013 model GS, achieved a "Good" rollover rating.

Euro NCAP scores for 2005 gave the GS the maximum five stars in Adult Occupant, four stars in Child Occupant, and two of four stars in the Pedestrian test categories. In the executive class the GS outscored all three of its German competitors in terms of adult occupant and pedestrian protection.

ANCAP test results* Lexus GS 300 (2005)
Test	Score
Overall	5 /5 stars
Frontal offset	14.81/16
Side impact	16/16
Pole	2/2
Seat belt reminders	2/3
Whiplash protection	Not Assessed
Pedestrian protection	Marginal
Electronic stability control	Standard

== Models ==
=== GRS191 / UZS190 (2005) ===
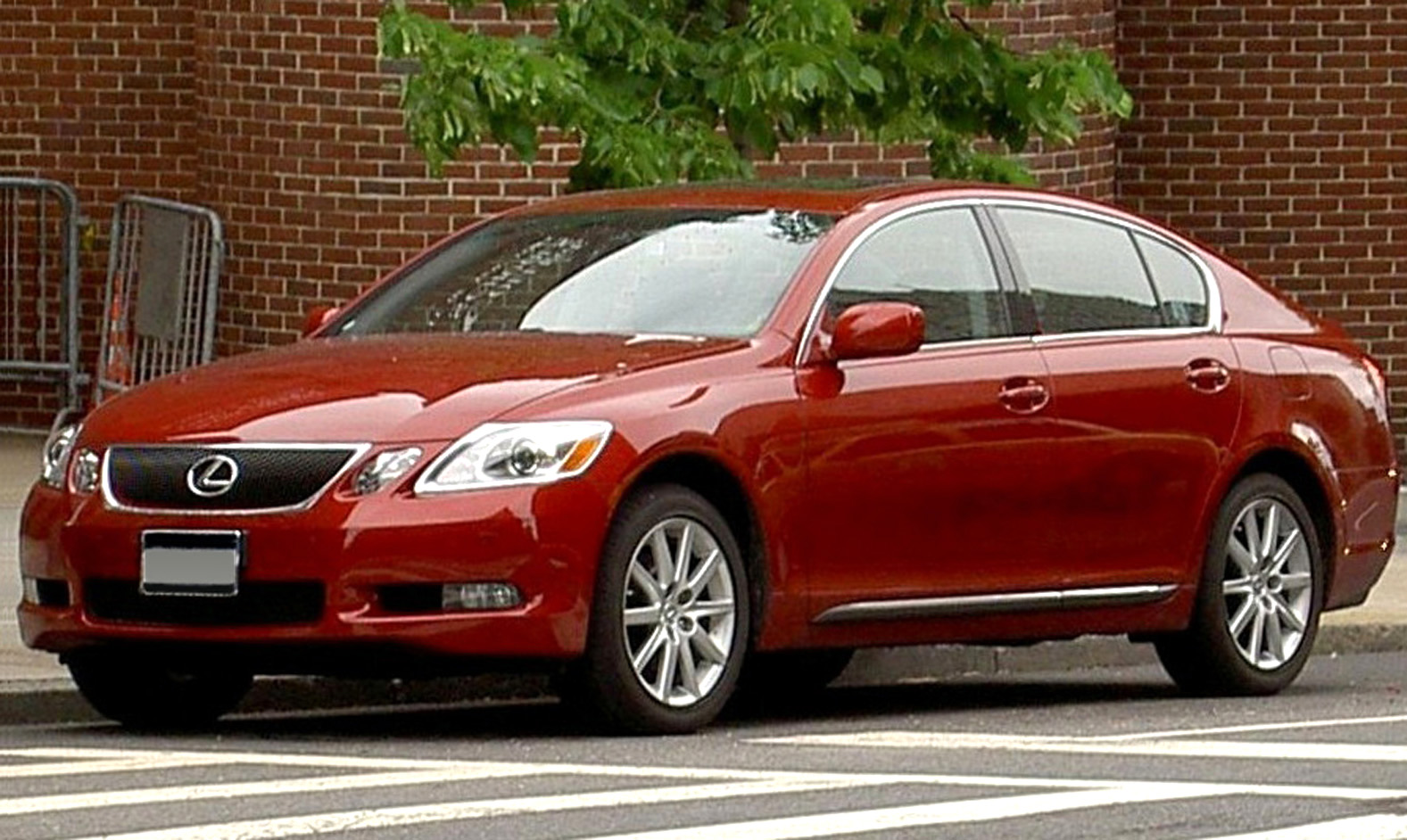
2005–2006 Lexus GS 430 (UZS190; U.S.)

In September 2005, the GS 350 (GRS191) and GS 430 (UZS190) went on sale in Japan; the GS 350 using a 3.5-liter 2GR-FSE V6 engine with D4-S direct injection, while the GS 430 used the same 4.3-liter 3UZ-FE V8 used in the previous model. Sales in the United States began in March 2005 for the 2006 model year, with the initial U.S. model lineup including the GS 300 (GRS190), featuring a ULEV certified 3.0-liter 3GR-FSE V6 engine, and the GS 430. The GS 300 featured a D4 direct-injection fuel system for all markets except Continental Asia, excluding Singapore, becoming Toyota's first vehicle equipped with direct injection sold in the United States. The 3.0-liter engine was also found in the Toyota Mark X as well as the Zero Toyota Crown, however the new GS 300 was never offered in the Japanese market. The GS 300, GS 350, and GS 430 engine options were paired to a new 6-speed automatic sequential shift gearbox. An all-wheel drive system was made available in the GS 300, thus becoming the first Lexus sedan to offer such a configuration; the system varied the front/rear wheel torque split anywhere from 50/50 to 30/70 depending on conditions.

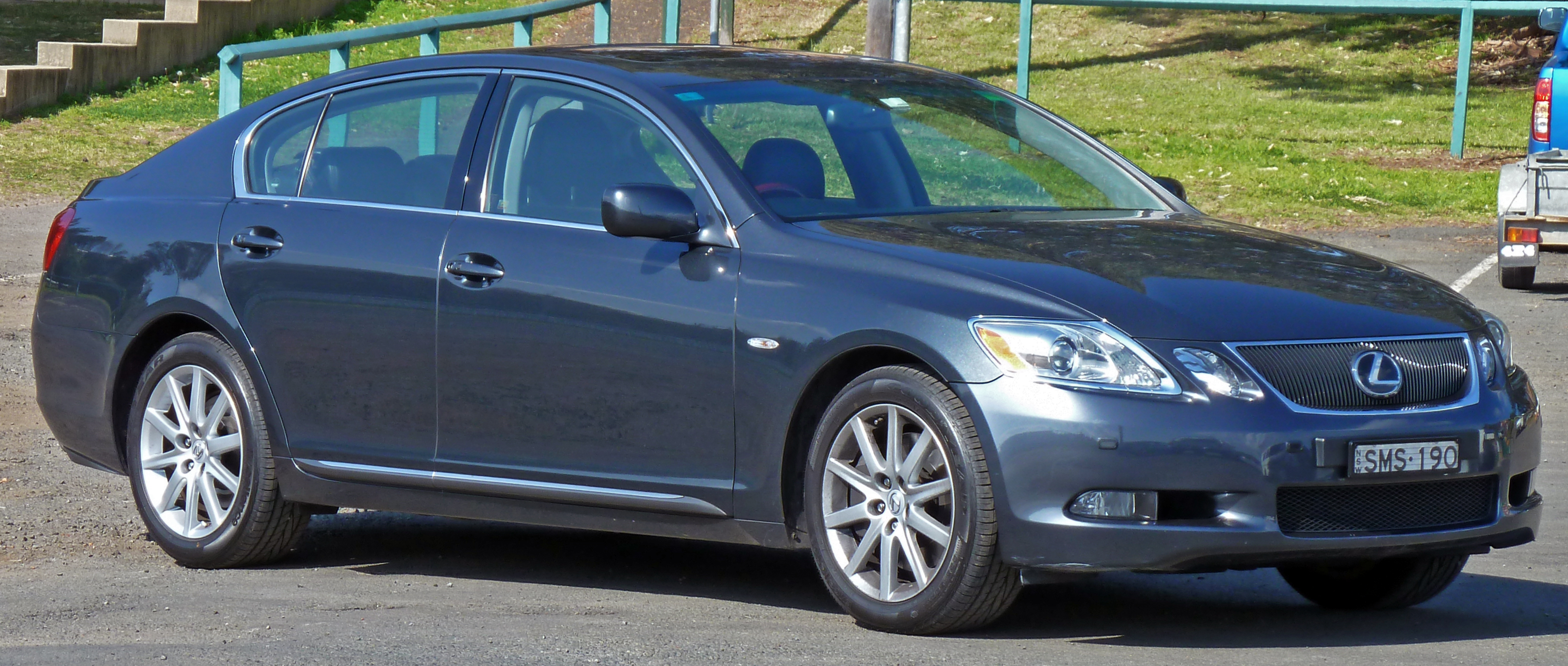
2005–2008 Lexus GS 300 (GRS190R; Australia)

Also new to the GS line was an Electric Power Steering (EPS) system replacing the previous model's hydraulic steering pump, while the V8 model featured a Variable Gear Ratio Steering (VGRS) system and Electronically Controlled Brake (ECB) a type of brake-by-wire system. In August 2005, the GS 430 was the first car by Toyota with Adaptive Variable Suspension (AVS). AVS monitors and adjusts the shock-absorber settings at each wheel, depending on the conditions. On rough roads, for example, damping is reduced for a more comfortable ride. And, while cornering, the suspension is tightened to help reduce body lean and provide even greater responsiveness. Using the EPS system the GS can automatically compensate for crosswinds.

In 2006, for the 2007 model year, the GS 350 replaced the GS 300 in the U.S. and other export markets. Due to a change in SAE testing procedures, the GS 430 horsepower rating was reduced from 224 to 216 kW (300 to 290 hp), with 433 N⋅m (319 lb⋅ft) of torque. The V6-powered GS 350 was rated at 226 kW (303 hp), with 371 N⋅m (274 lb⋅ft) of torque. Lexus reported 0–97 km/h (0–60 mph) times of 5.7 seconds for both vehicles. In 2007, for the 2008 model eyar, the GS 350 came with Vehicle Dynamics Integrated Management (VDIM), which was previously standard only on V8 and hybrid models. The Adaptive Variable Suspension (AVS) was now an option on the V6 model as well.

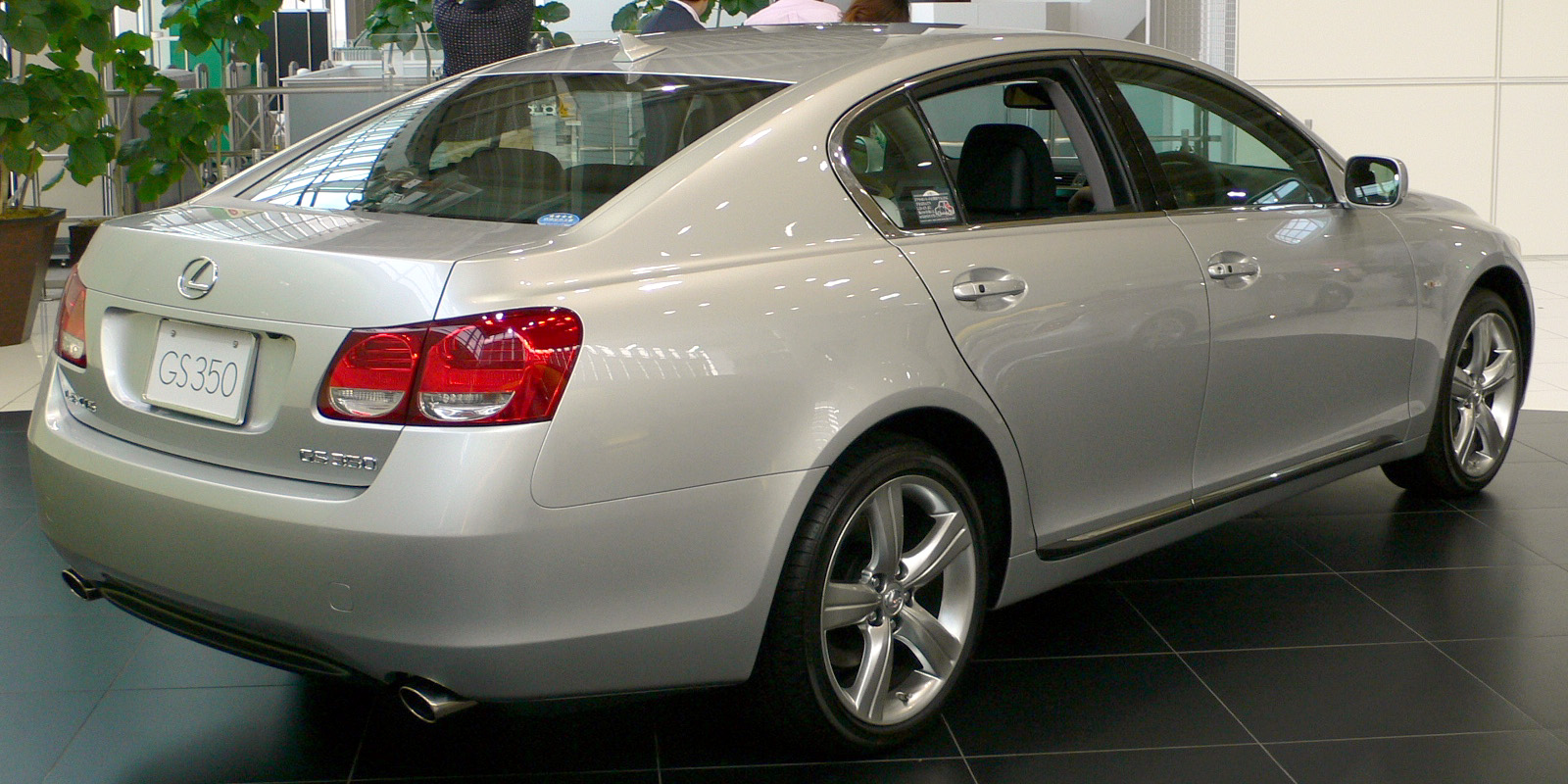
2005–2008 Lexus GS 350 (GRS191; Japan)

In 2007, Consumer Reports predicted reliability survey blamed the first-year GS in the all-wheel-drive form, which had problems in integrity (rattles), body hardware and sound system, as the sole reason for lowering Lexus' overall score. Despite the reliability issues among the first year GS models, the vehicle earned a "Recommended" rating from Consumer Reports for vehicle features, overall value and previously automatically assumed reliability for that year. However, the problems have apparently been solved, and the GS AWD was rated "average" in later years.

=== GWS191 (2006) ===
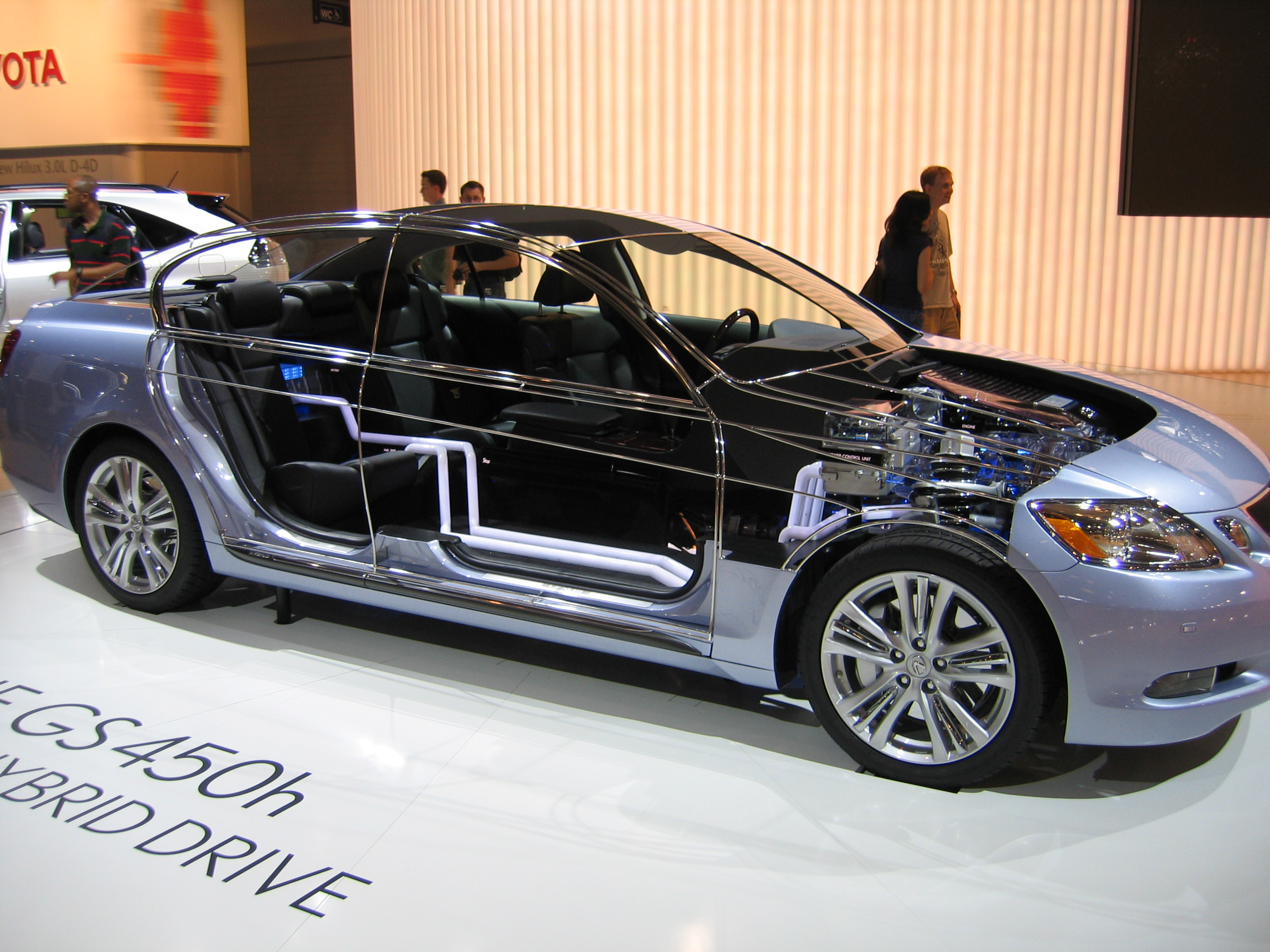
Cutaway model showing the GS 450h powertrain.

Unveiled at the 2005 New York International Auto Show, the hybrid GS 450h (GWS191) joined the GS line in 2006 for the 2007 model year. It was the first mass-production rear-wheel drive luxury hybrid car. Its powertrain included a naturally aspirated 3.5-liter 2GR-FSE V6 engine mated to an electric motor and a continuously variable transmission. This powertrain made use of the Lexus Hybrid Drive system of integrating electric and gasoline engine motors, giving the GS 450h a Super Ultra Low Emissions Vehicle (SULEV) emissions rating. In some markets, however, the car could only be purchased with at least one option package, which raises the price by several thousand dollars. The rear-mounted battery also consumed significant trunk space, which was improved in 2009 when Lexus redesigned the trunk area to increase space by forty percent, from 210 L (7.5 cu ft) in 2007 and 2008, to 300 L (10.6 cu ft). The GS 450h went on sale in Japan on 16 March 2006.

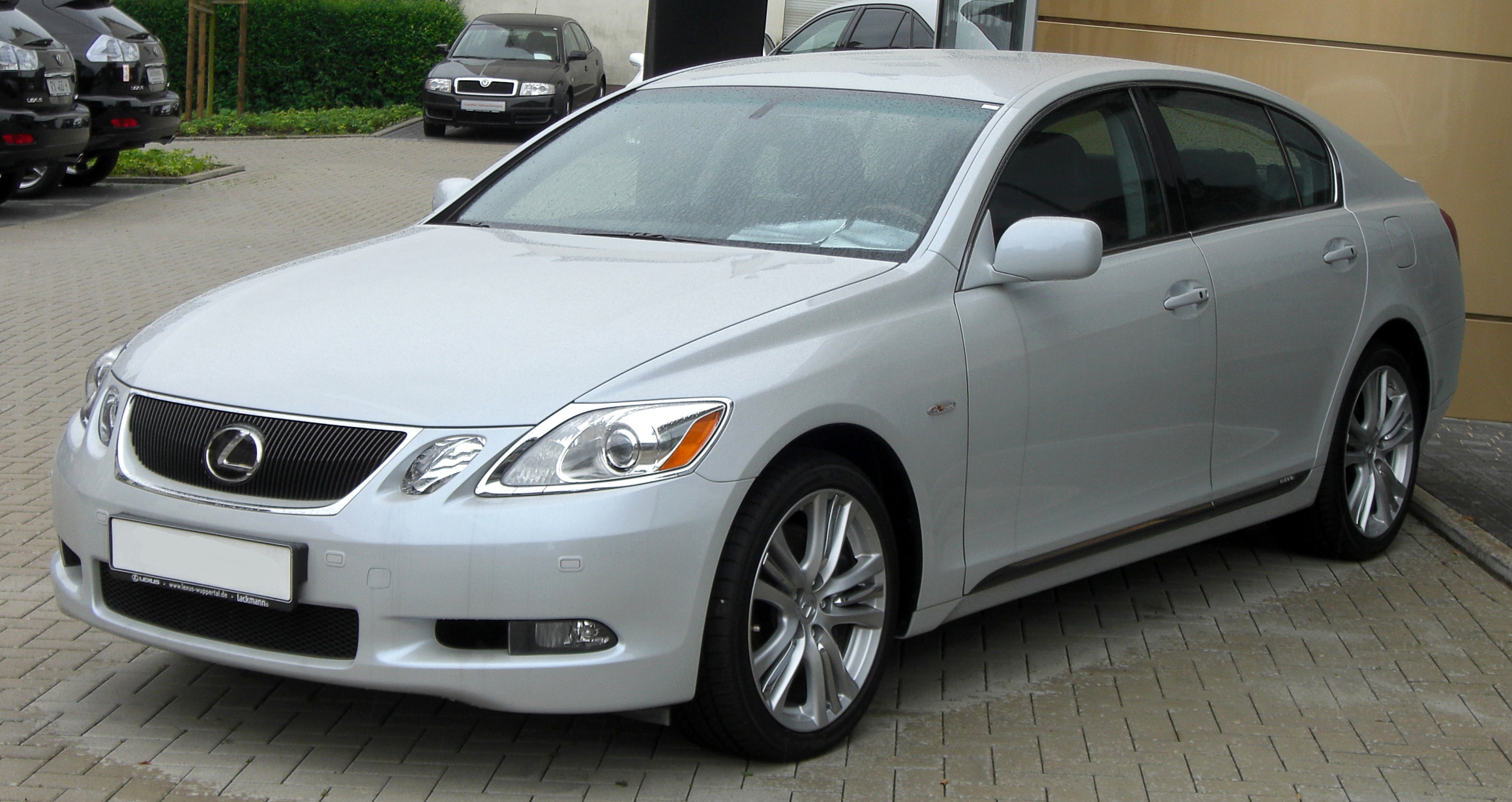
2006–2009 Lexus GS 450h (GWS191; Europe)

The GS 450h weighed 1,875 kg (4,135 lb), but the combined hybrid powertrain produced 253 kW (339 hp), allowing the GS to accelerate 0–97 km/h (0–60 mph) in 5.2 seconds, according to manufacturer data, compared to the GS 460's 5.4 seconds. U.S. Environmental Protection Agency-rated highway fuel economy was 11 km/L (25 mpg_{‑US}; 30 mpg_{‑imp}), while the city fuel economy was rated at 9.4 km/L (22 mpg_{‑US}; 26 mpg_{‑imp}), which is slightly unusual for hybrid vehicles of this type (as they normally have higher city fuel economy ratings).

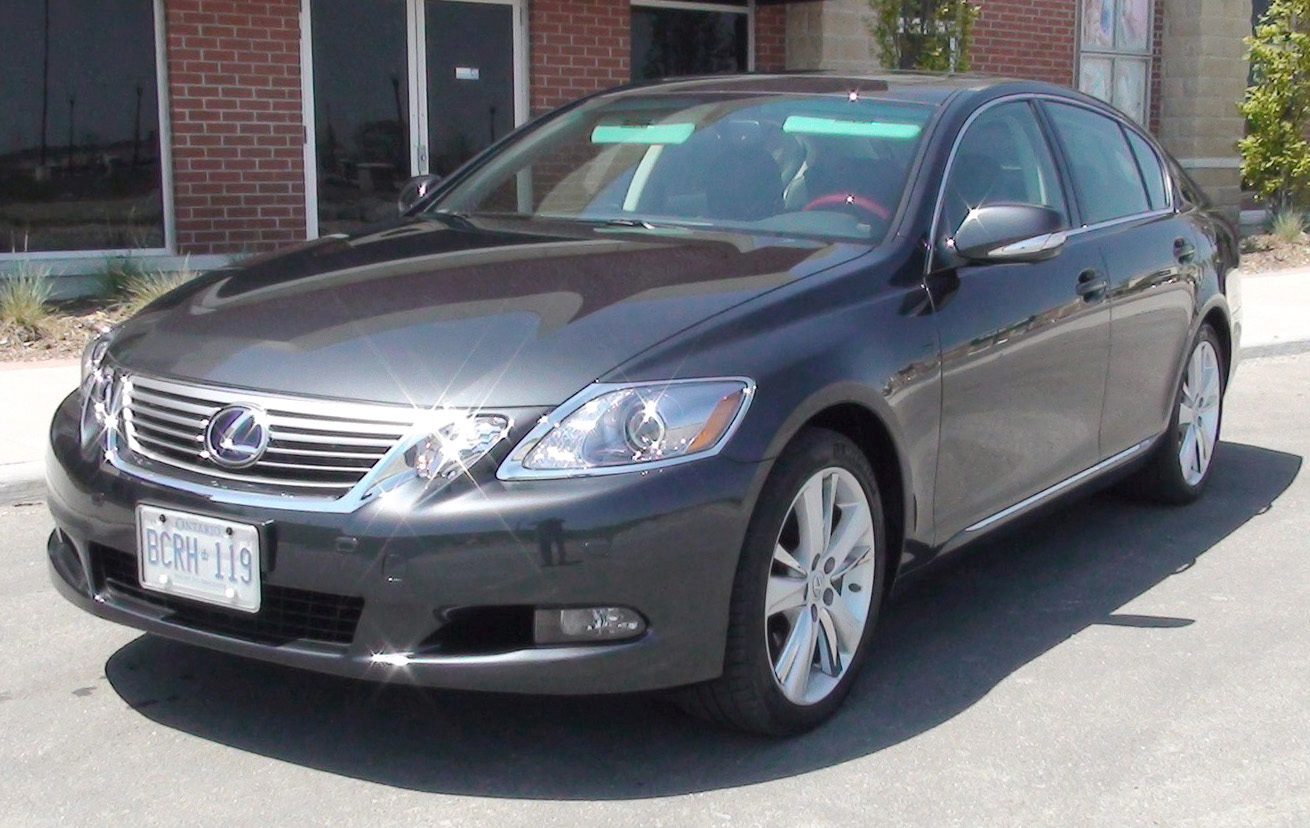
2009-2011 Leuxs GS 450h

Motoring journalist Jeremy Clarkson, a famous critic of hybrid vehicles and the Toyota Prius especially, admitted he loved the GS 450h. After claiming that you spent most of the time on the Prius "chewing a lot of fuel" and "making a green statement," he described "with the Lexus I drove up and down Piccadilly all day. It was great." He also felt that the GS 450h was "balanced nicely by the styling, the quality and the sense that you really are in something a little bit different." Clarkson also positively referred to the benefit of a hybrid car being exempt from the London congestion charge (for a £10 one off administration fee to register it). In 2009, the GS 450h received a new hybrid-only grille and refreshing.

=== URS191 (2008) ===
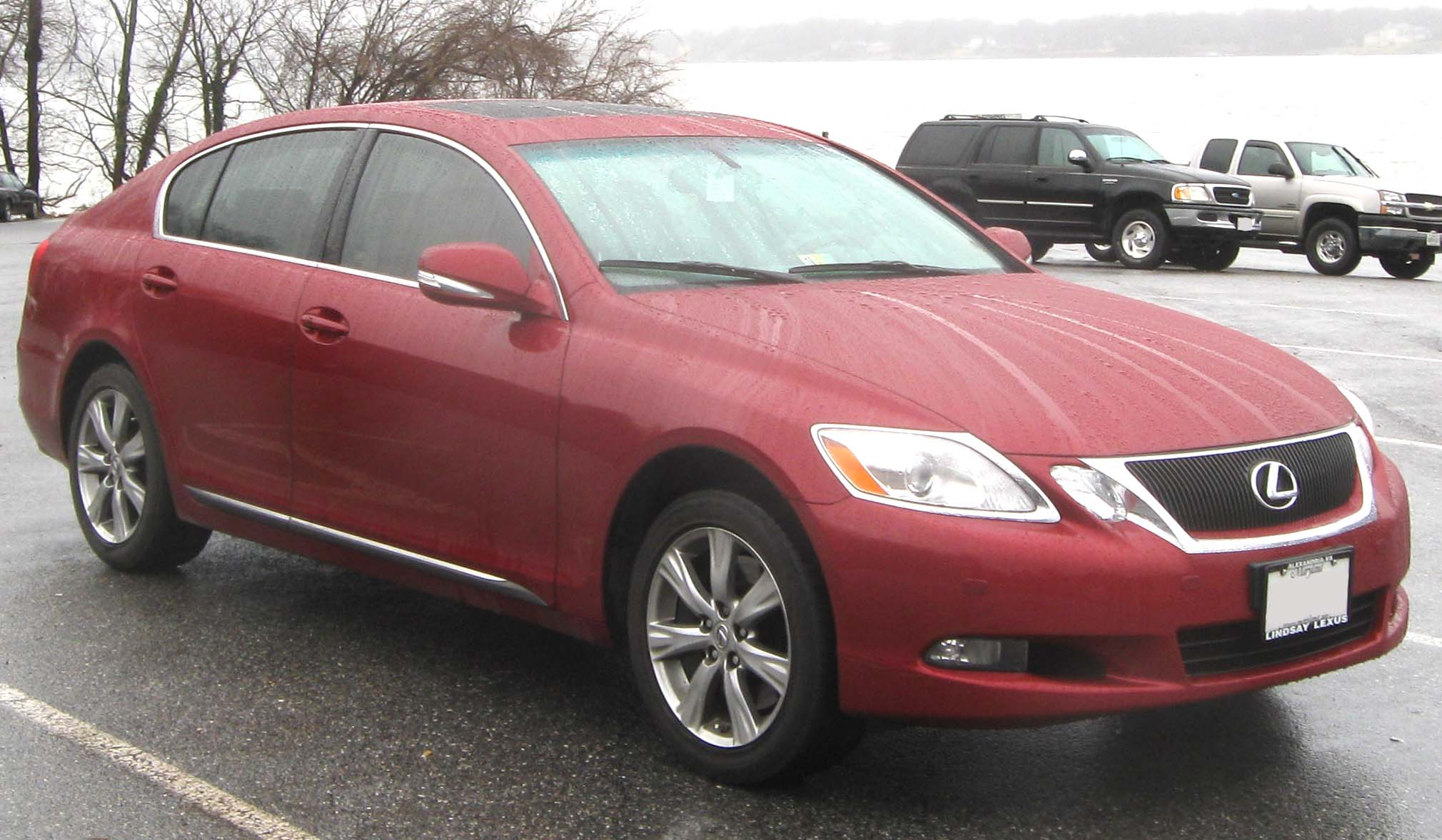
MY2009 Lexus GS 350 (GRS196; U.S.)

A 4.6-liter GS 460 (URS191) replaced the GS 430 in 2007 for the 2008 model year. Equipped with the new 4.6 liter 1UR-FE/1UR-FSE V8 engine generating 255 kW (342 hp) (with 460 N⋅m (339 lb⋅ft). of torque) and an 8-speed automatic transmission. Lexus reported a 0-60 time of 5.4 seconds for the GS 460. Along with the hybrid GS 450h and previous GS 430 models, the V8-powered GS 460 offered the Active Stabilizer Suspension System for improved handling.

Coinciding with the introduction of the GS 460, the GS lineup received a mid-cycle styling refresh, including a revised front bumper, headlights and grille, turn signals added to the side mirrors, and new wheel options and exterior colors. Inside the vehicle, the GS received a redesigned steering wheel, revised instrument cluster gauges, and different trim pieces.

== Limited editions ==
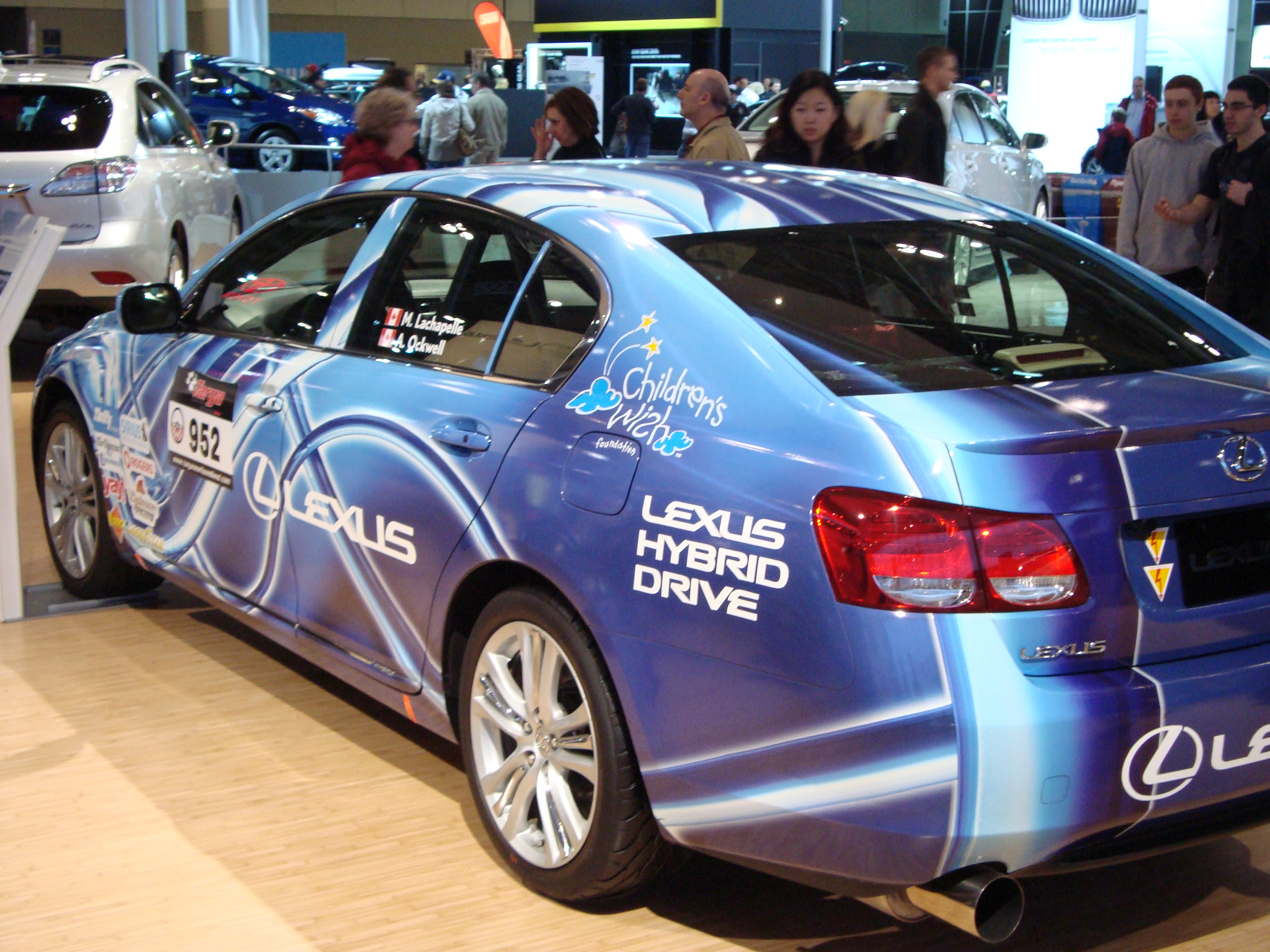
GS 450h Targa Newfoundland racer

75 "Neiman Marcus Edition" GS 450h sedans were offered as the annual holiday catalog car at a price of $65,000. All were sold in less than three hours on 19 October 2005 and were delivered around April 2006. In 2008, Lexus Japan released a 500-unit limited "Passionate Black" edition of the GS 350, GS 450h, and GS 460, featuring a custom black leather interior with red piping trim. Lexus Japan also released a 300-unit limited "Meteor Black" edition of the GS 350, featuring all-black leather interior with silver trim. For 2010, to commemorate the fifth anniversary of the launch of Lexus Japan, a "Sunset" special edition model was produced in conjunction with Spanish design duo Stone Designs. The GS "Sunset" model featured a multi-tone interior with contrast seat leather hues of orange and saddle.

The Lexus is now being used by the Wiltshire Police Constabulary in England as an unmarked police car. In 2007, a GS 450h was also entered in the Targa Newfoundland event.

== Specifications ==
Model configurations by region
Chassis code	Model no.	Model year(s)	Drivetrain	Transmission	Engine type	Engine code	Region(s)
GRS190	GS 300	2006–2010	RWD/AWD	6-speed AT	3.0 L petrol V6	3GR-FE/3GR-FSE	Australia, China, Europe, Middle East, United States
GRS191	GS 350	2007–2011	RWD/AWD	6-speed AT	3.5 L petrol V6	2GR-FSE	Canada, Europe, Japan, United States
GWS191	GS 450h	2007–2011	RWD	CVT	3.5 L hybrid V6	2GR-FSE	Australia, Canada, China, Europe, Japan, United States
UZS190	GS 430	2006–2007	RWD	6-speed AT	4.3 L petrol V8	3UZ-FE	Australia, Middle East, United States
URS190	GS 460	2008–2011	RWD	8-speed AT	4.6 L petrol V8	1UR-FE/1UR-FSE	Australia, Canada, China, Europe, Japan, United States

== Awards ==
Several awards won by the third generation Lexus GS include the Paul Pietsch Prize for Advanced Technology in 2007, awarded by technical editors of Auto Motor Und Sport, 2007 IF product design award from the International Forum Design group in Hannover, Germany, and Auto Bild "Auto 1" award for best sedan in 2007.
