= Mego =

Mego may refer to:

- Mego Records, an Austrian record label
- Mego Corporation, a toy company that produced action figures during the 1970s and early 1980s
- Mego (motorbikes), a Greek motorcycle manufacturer
- Mego (Kim Possible), a fictional superhero
- Mego, a subdistrict in Sikka Regency, East Nusa Tenggara, Indonesia

== See also ==
- Mega (disambiguation)
