= Hellenic State =

Hellenic State (Greek: Ελληνική Πολιτεία), also translated as Greek State, was used as the official name of the modern Greek state three times in its history:

- First Hellenic Republic during the period of governance by Ioannis Kapodistrias in 1828–1832, when Greece was first constituted as a regular state after the Greek War of Independence.
- The first few months of the Second Hellenic Republic, after which the name was changed to Hellenic Republic on 24 May 1924.
- Hellenic State, during the period of Axis occupation (1941–1944) of the country during World War II, when the pro-Axis government renamed the country in opposition to the pro-Allies Kingdom of Greece, which remained in exile in Egypt.

== See also ==
- Hellenic Republic (disambiguation)
- Hellas
