= AK Hellas =

Greek Manufacturer company

AK Hellas logo

AK Hellas (the initials standing for the full name of the company, 'Aggelopoulos-Karkanis O.E.') was a Greek manufacturer of light trucks and other metal products. It designed and produced two basic types of vehicles - all three-wheelers with 50cc engines, taking advantage of a favorable classification as "motorbikes" according to Greek law.

== Background ==
One group of models it produced since 1965 were light trucks with "motorcycle" structure (steering and controls), a type of vehicle also produced in Greece by MEBEA (by far the most successful), Mego, Alta, Saracakis, Pitsos (a big home appliances manufacturer), Markal, Naxos and others. The other group of models were "proper" micro-trucks, with "automobile" structure of steering, controls etc. It was in this category that AK Hellas became the biggest truck manufacturer in Greece, leaving behind MEBEA, Delta (a product of Attica), Minicar, Zamba and other smaller Greek manufacturers. The company's T200 model, using a Sachs 50cc 4.8 hp engine and with a payload of 150 kg was produced between 1968 and 1975 with three different cab designs and in several versions (including van models). According to Dimitrios N. Aggelopoulos, several thousand units were produced, while other branches created by the same entrepreneur, were involved in production of pleasure boats, biological cleaning units, telephone booths, phone switchboards, generating sets, helmets, storage tanks, prefab container houses, wind turbine blades, irrigation systems, etc.
