= Toyota N platform =

Car platform for executive cars

The Toyota N platform is a car platform for executive cars (E-class models) from Toyota, introduced in 2003. It is often called "Mark X platform" and "Crown platform", after its core uses, and, less frequently, "Lexus GS platform". It is used on a variety of sizes of rear- and all-wheel drive automobiles, ranging from compact to full-sized executive.

In 2018, the N platform was replaced by the Toyota New Global Architecture TNGA-L platform.

== Features ==
- The body is monocoque;
- It is a rear-wheel drive platform, with optional four-wheel drive;
- 4WD variants use Toyota's FOUR system, which is full-time with 3 differentials (center, rear and front);
- Engines are mounted longitudinally;
- Front suspension is double wishbone, while the rear is multi-link;
- Disc brakes are used on all wheels.

== N ==
=== Applications ===
- Lexus LF-X concept (2003)
- Toyota Crown/Crown Majesta — S180 (2003–2008), S200 (2008–2012), S210 (2012–2020)
- Toyota Mark X sedan — X120 (2004–2009), X130 (2009–2019)
- Toyota Century — G60 (2018–present)
- Lexus IS — XE20 (2005–2014)
- Lexus GS — S190 (2005–2012)
- Lexus LS — XF40 (2007–2017)
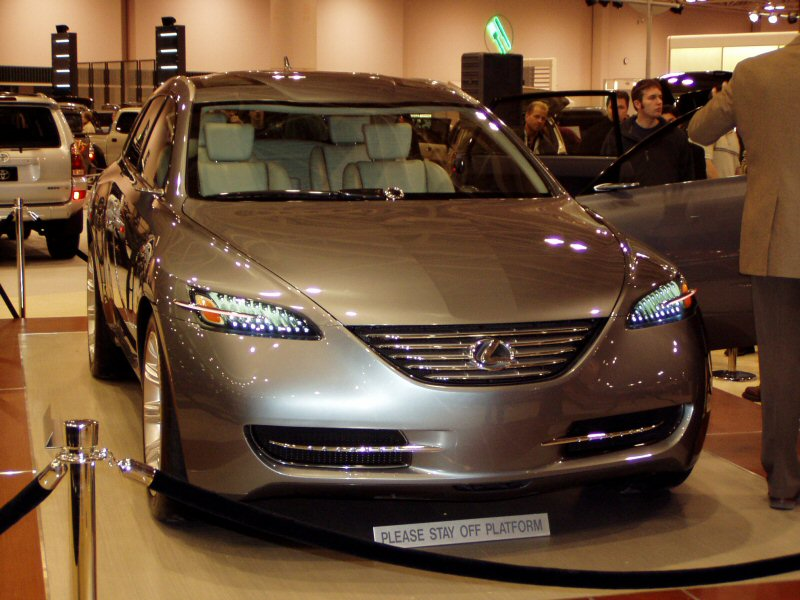
Lexus LF-X concept

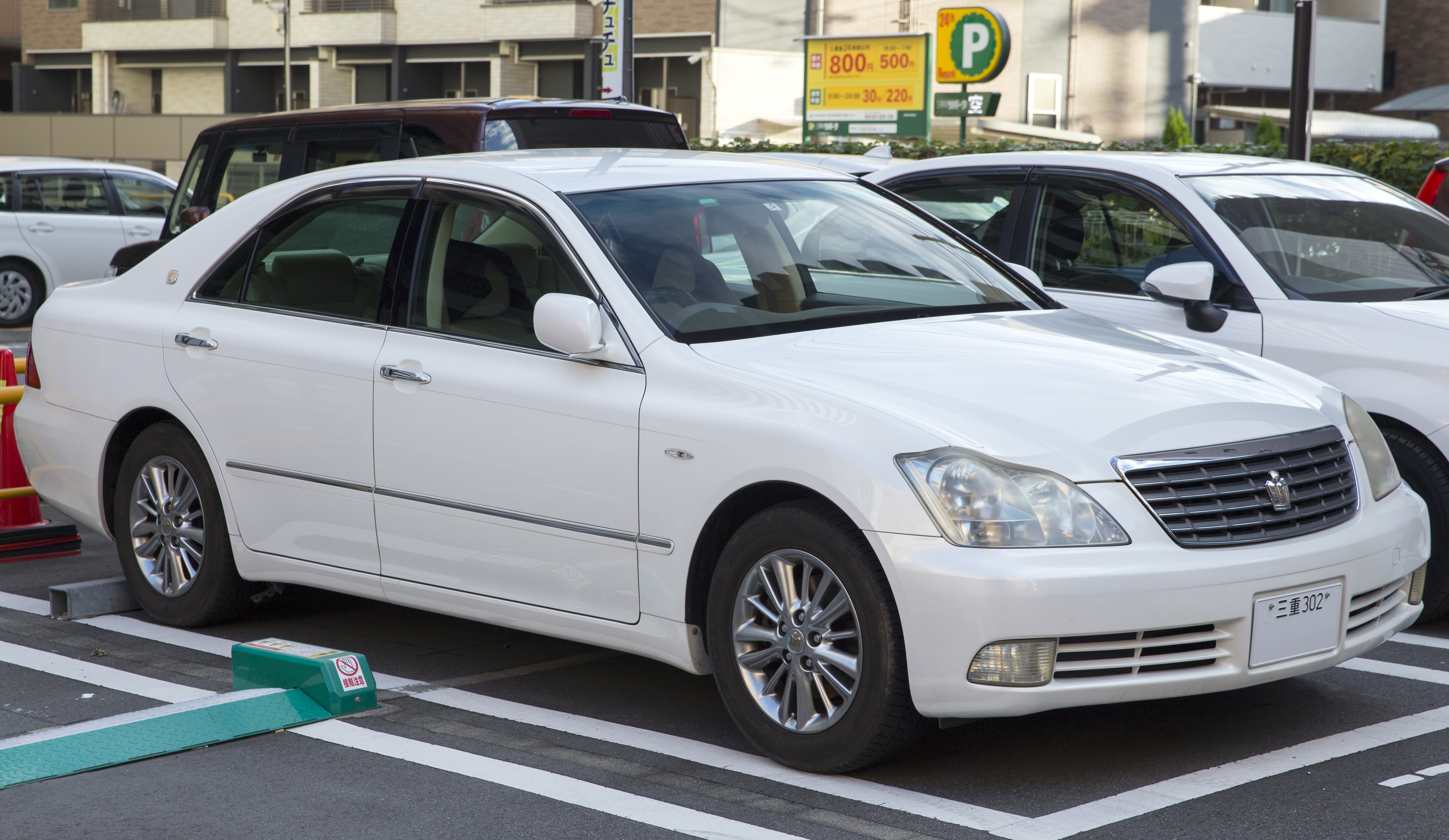
Toyota Crown/Crown Majesta (S180)

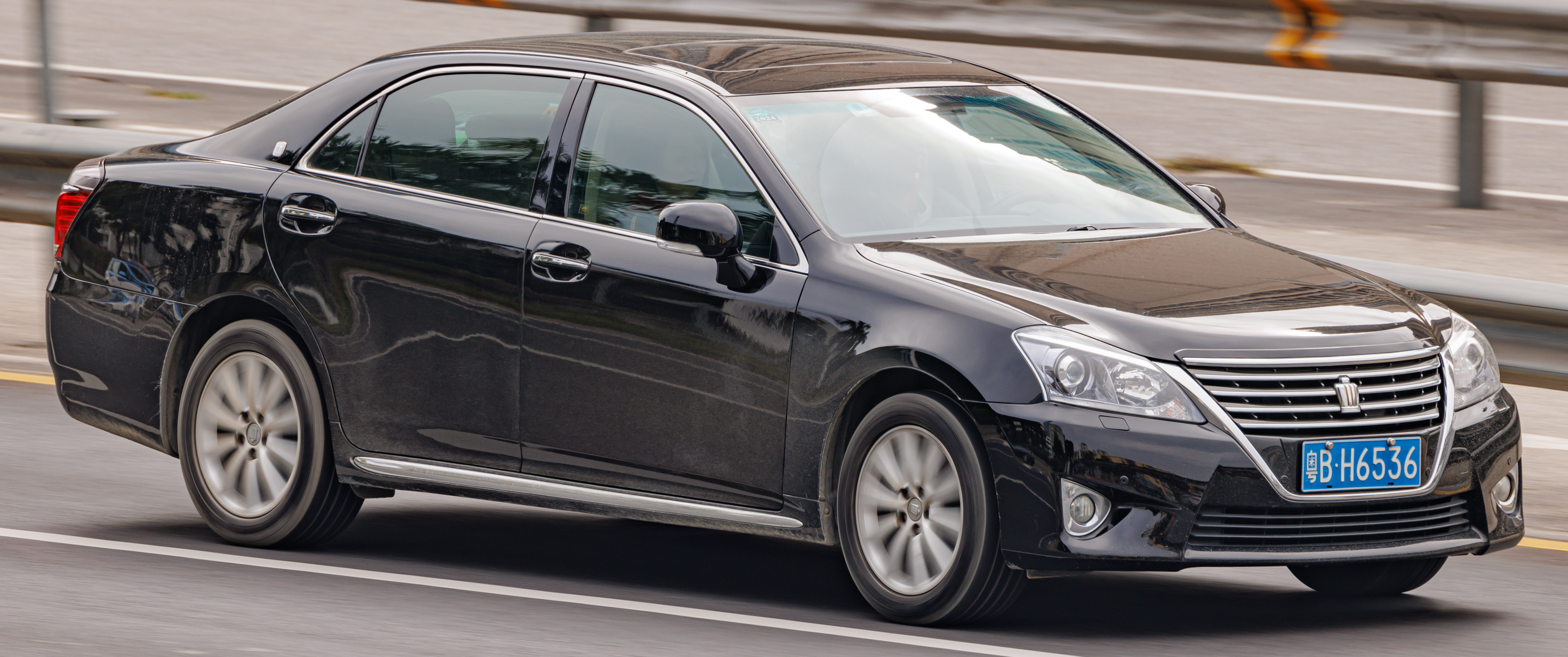
Toyota Crown/Crown Majesta (S200)

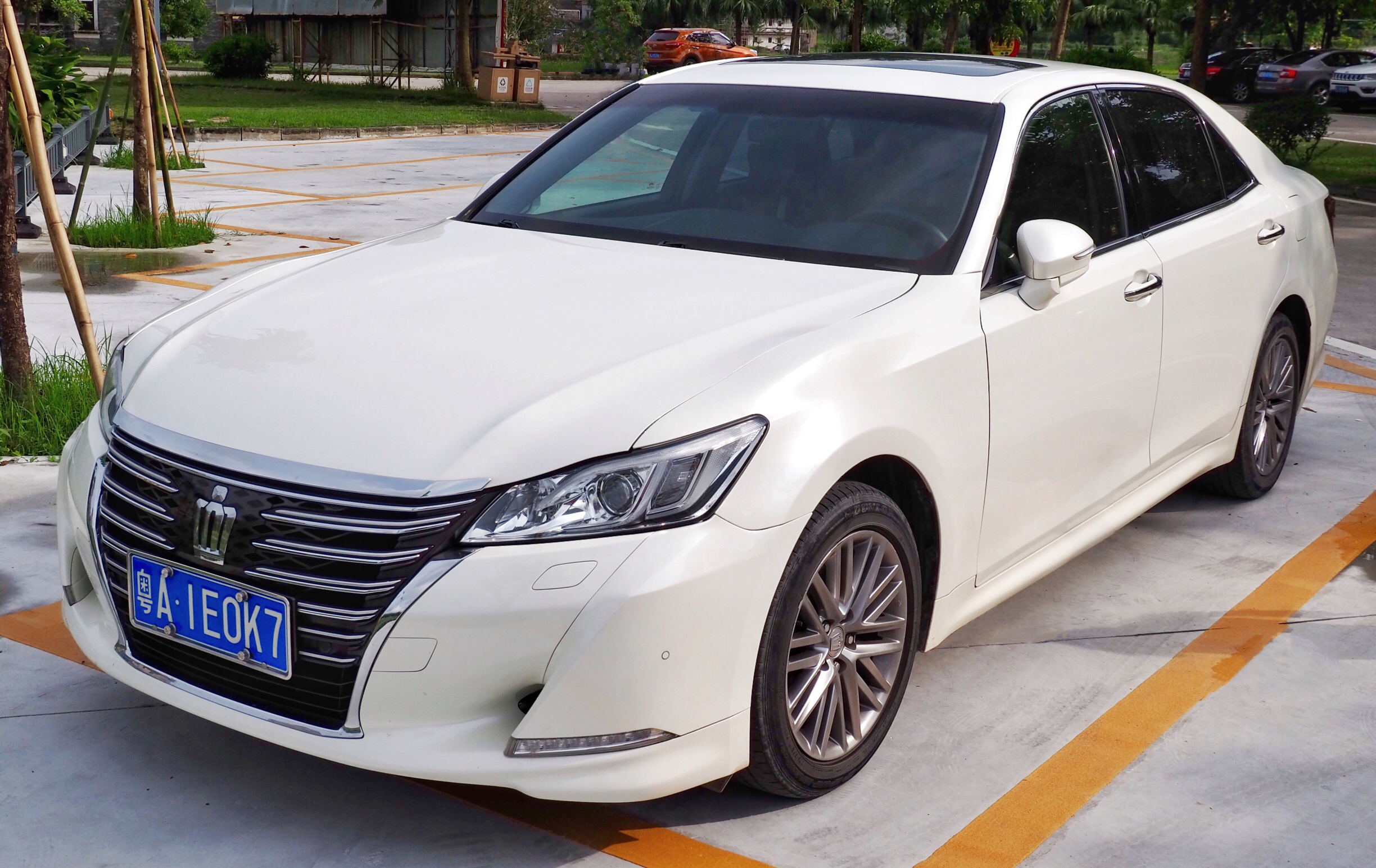
Toyota Crown/Crown Majesta (S210)

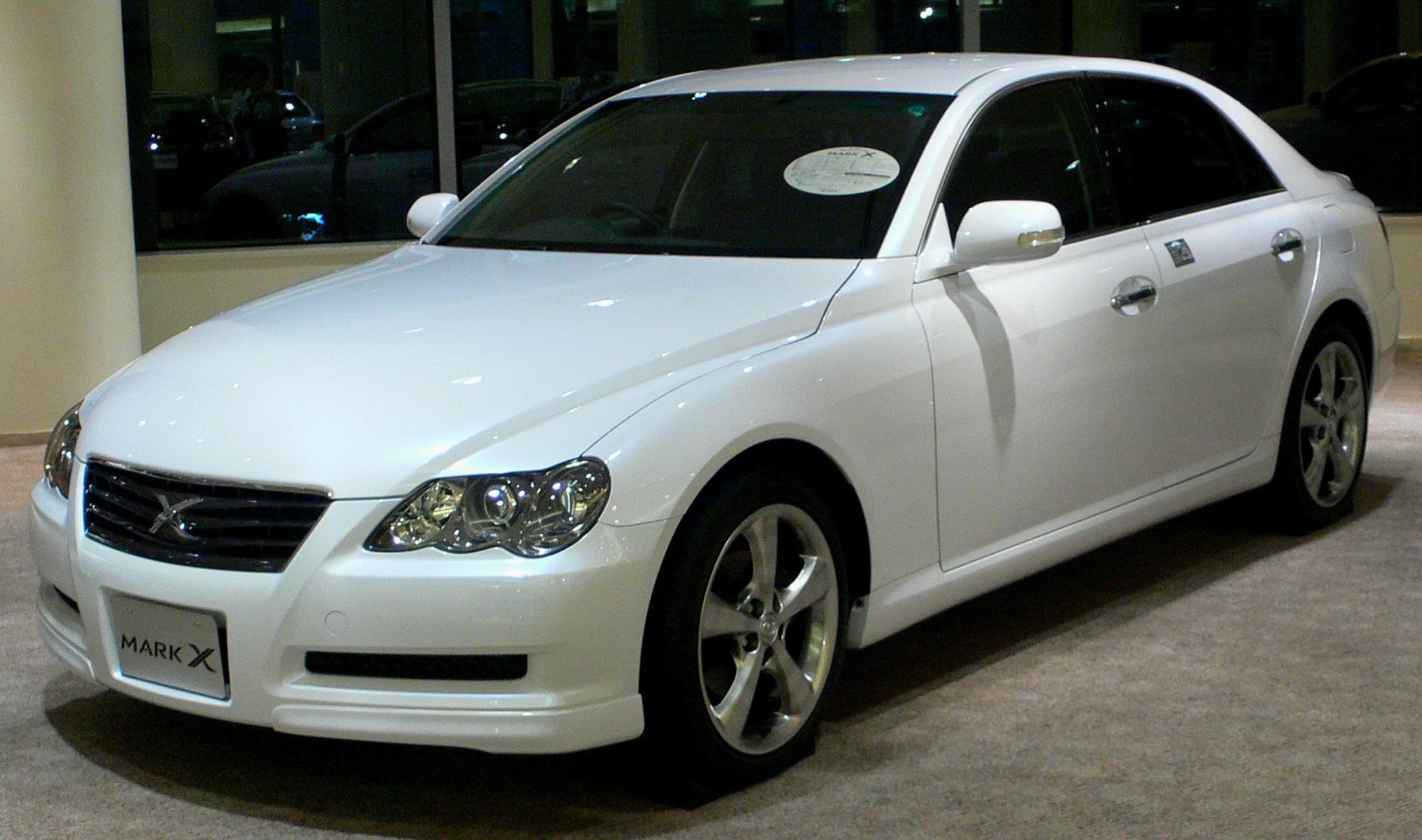
Toyota Mark X/Reiz (X120)

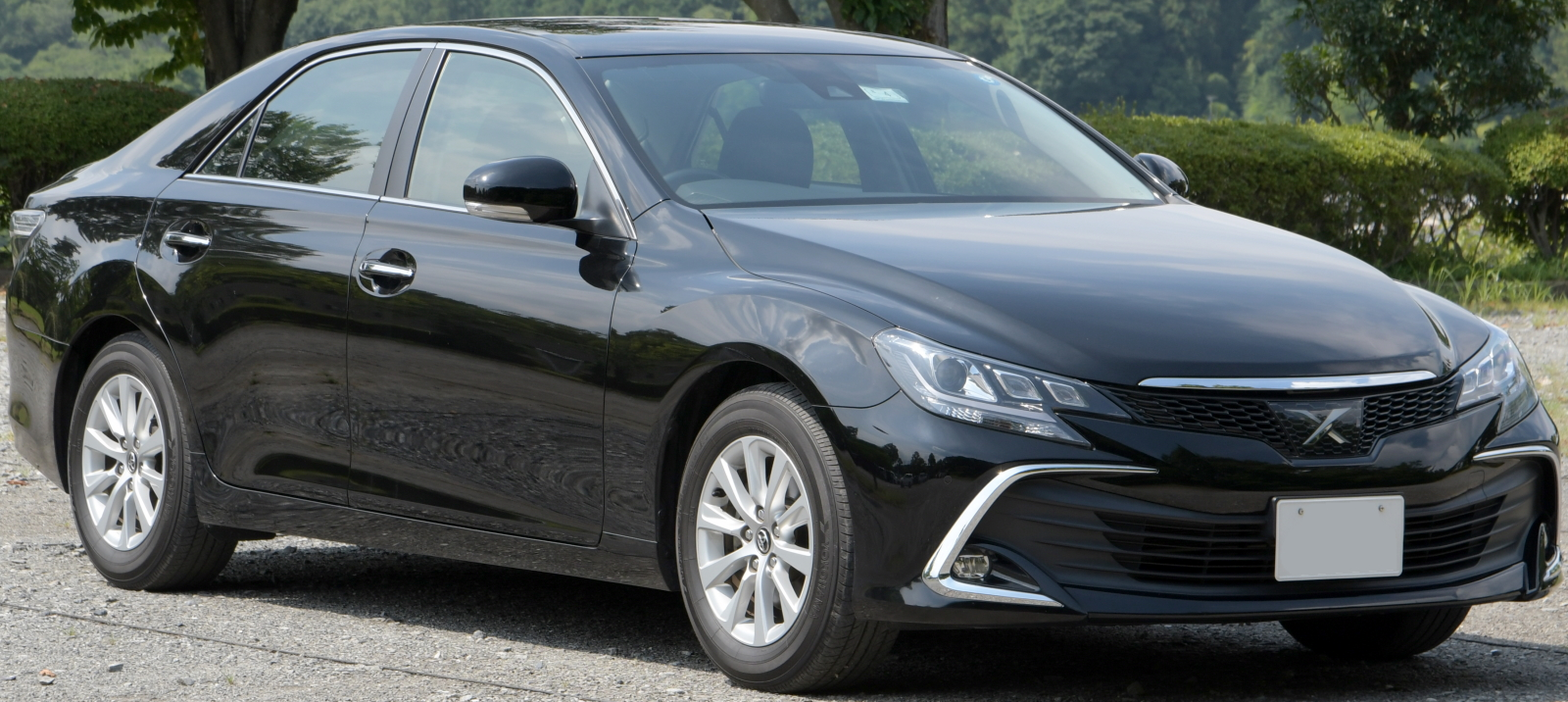
Toyota Mark X/Reiz (X130)

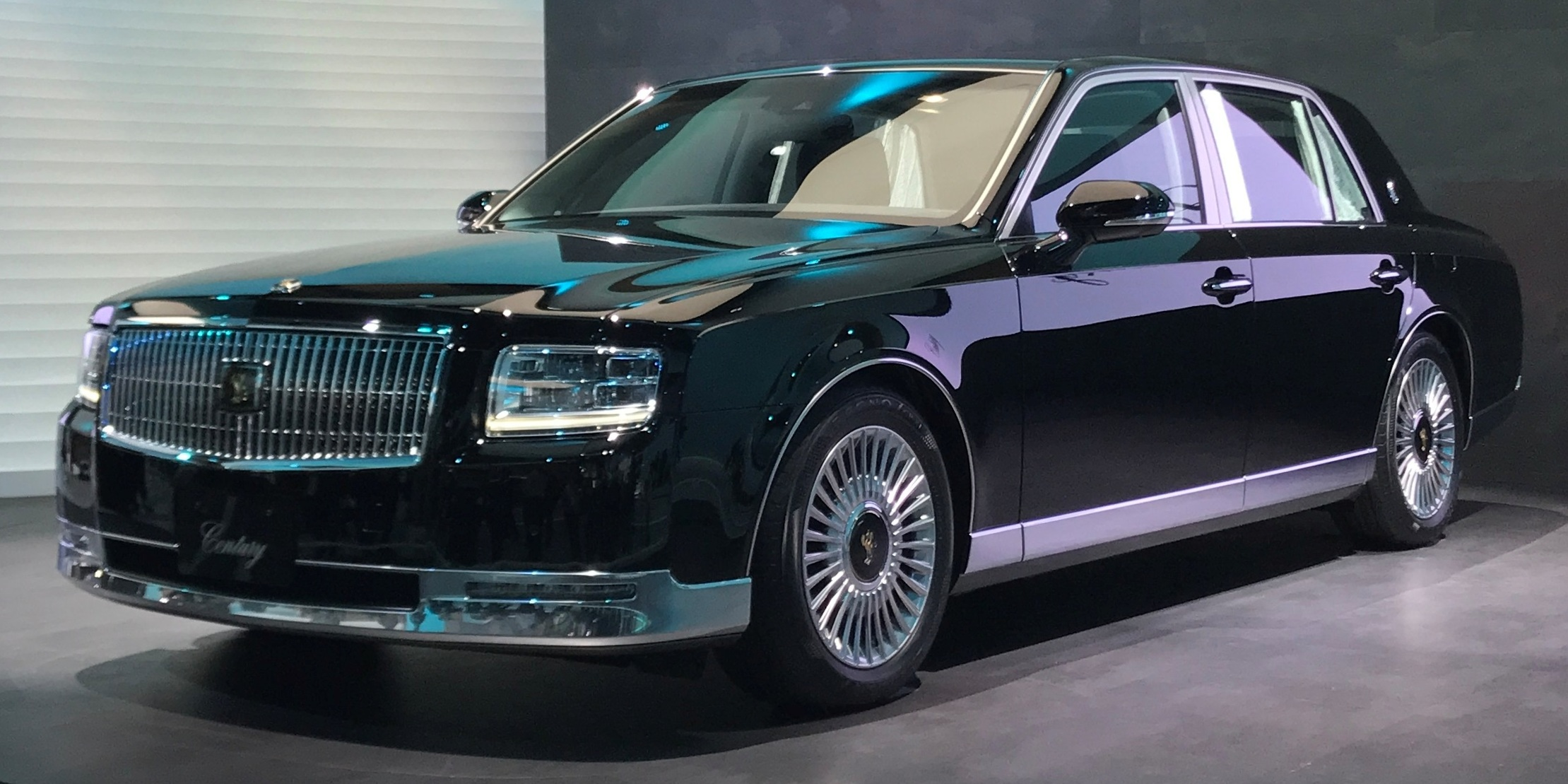
Toyota Century

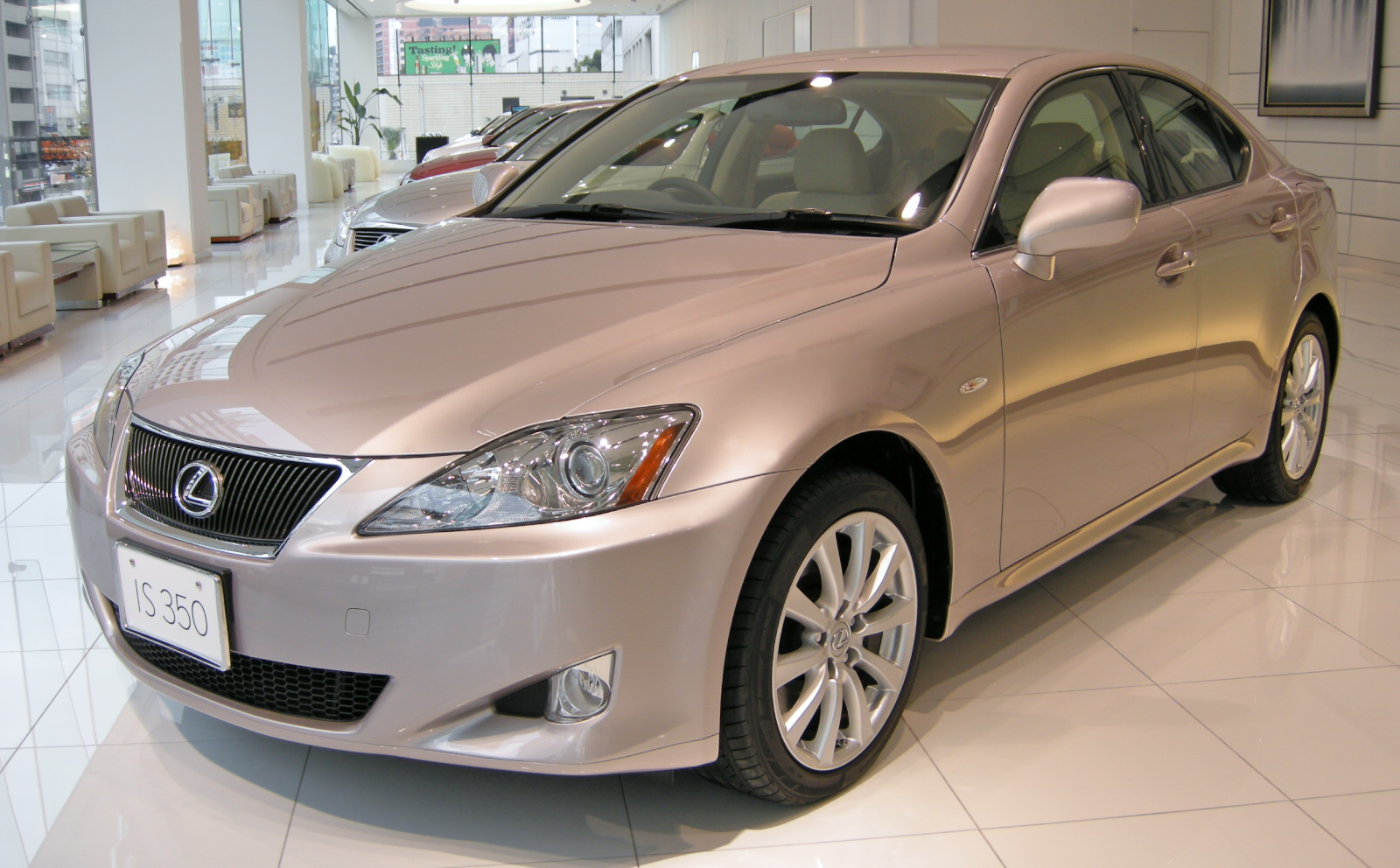
Lexus IS (SE20)

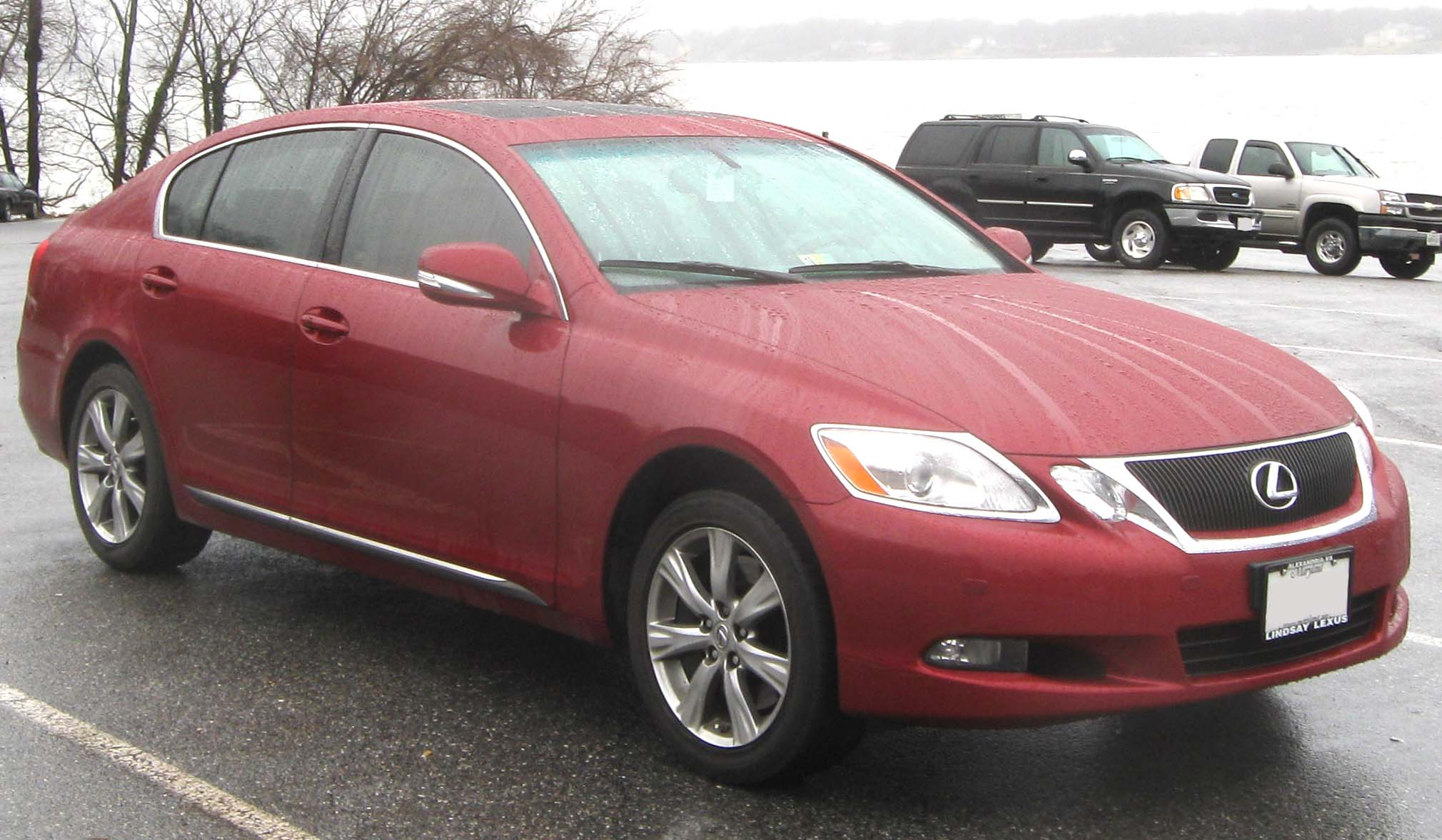
Lexus GS (S190)

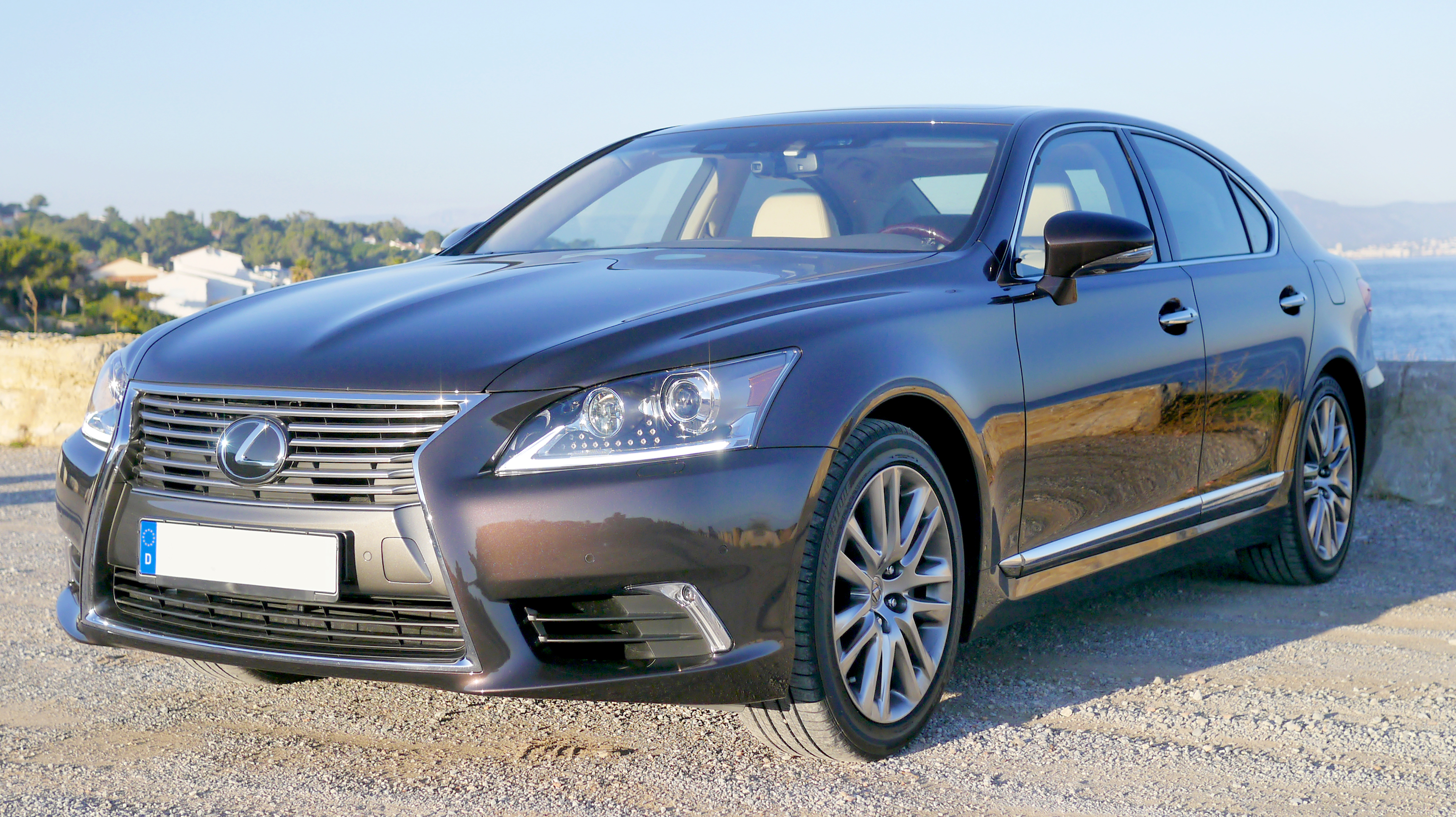
Lexus LS

== New N ==
=== Applications ===
- Lexus GS — L10 (2012–2020)
- Lexus IS — XE30 (2013–present)
- Lexus RC — XC10 (2014–2025)
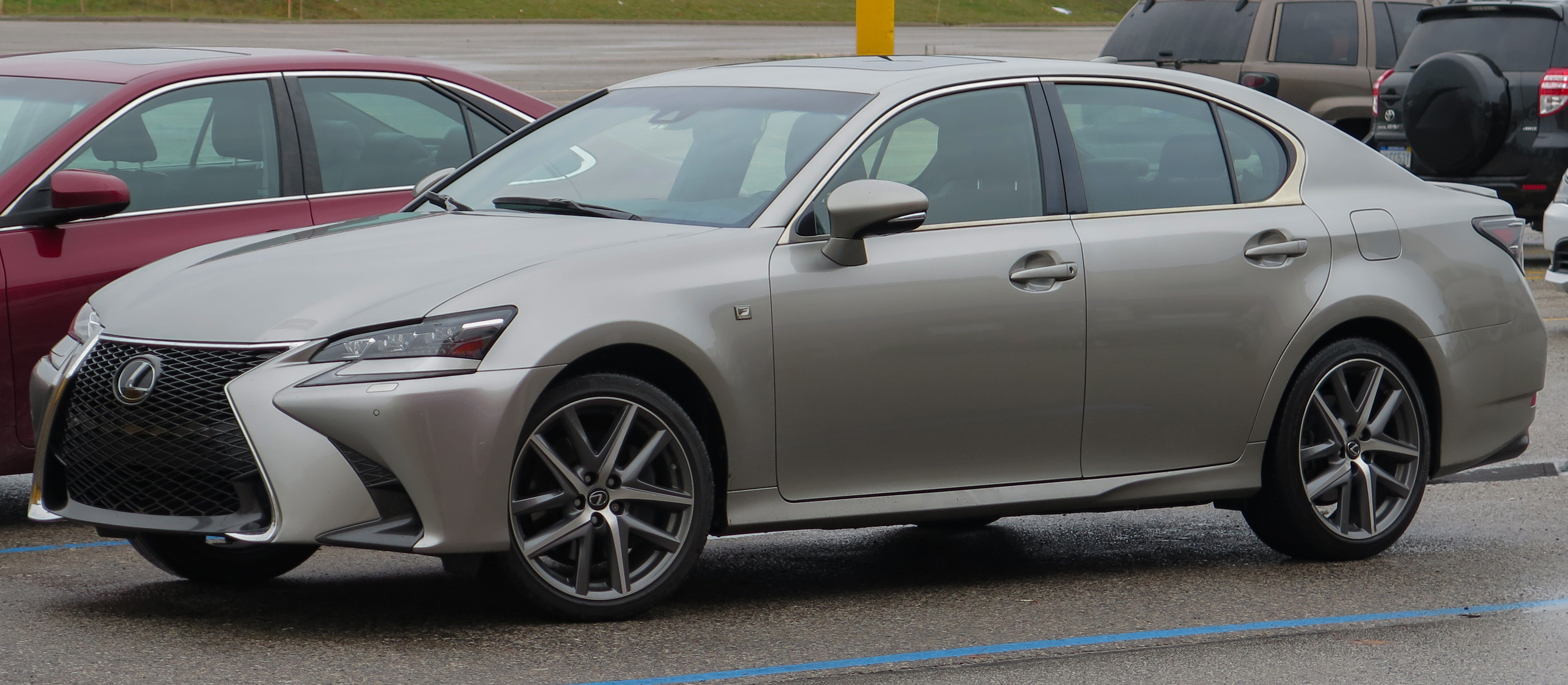
Lexus GS (L10)

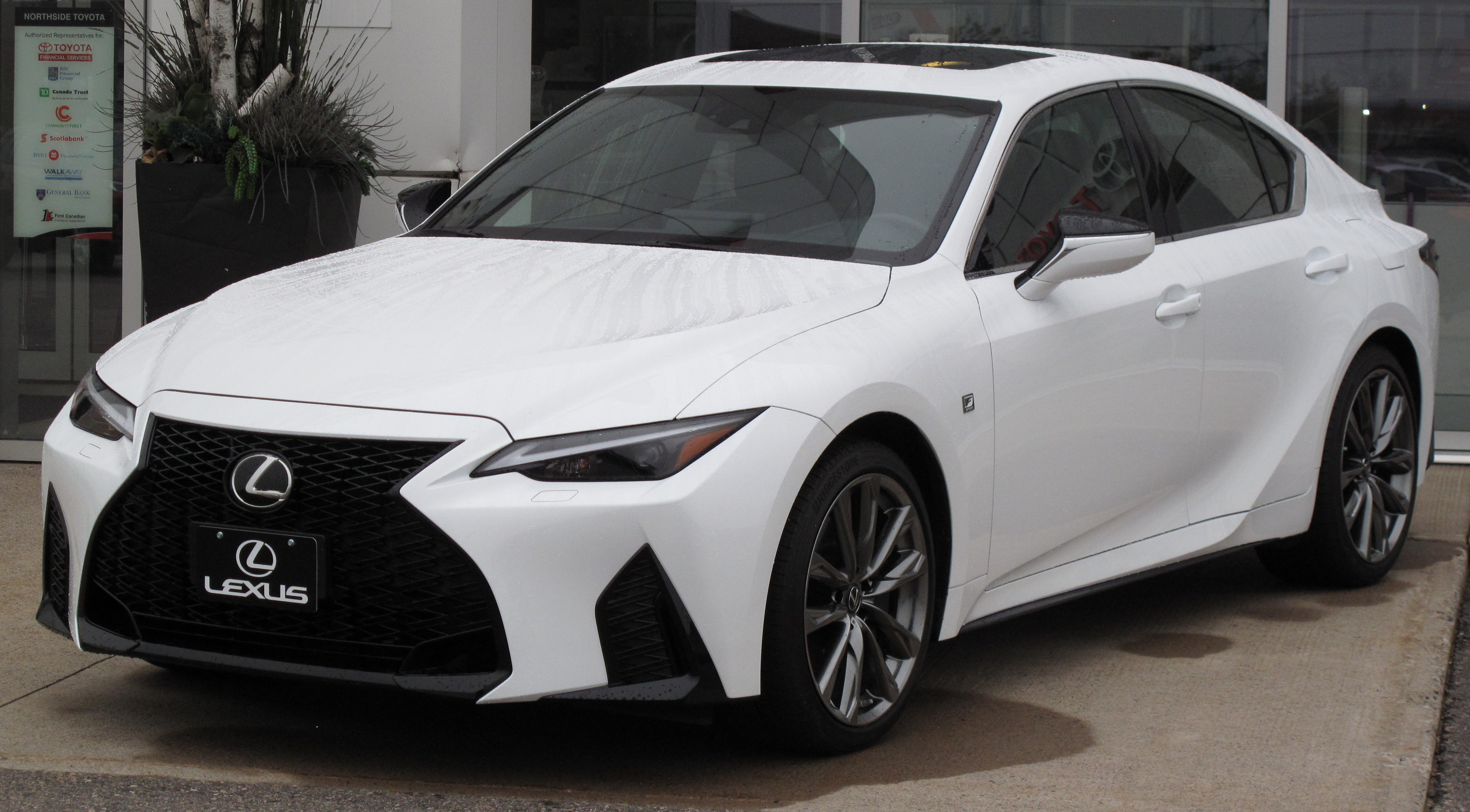
Lexus IS (XE30)

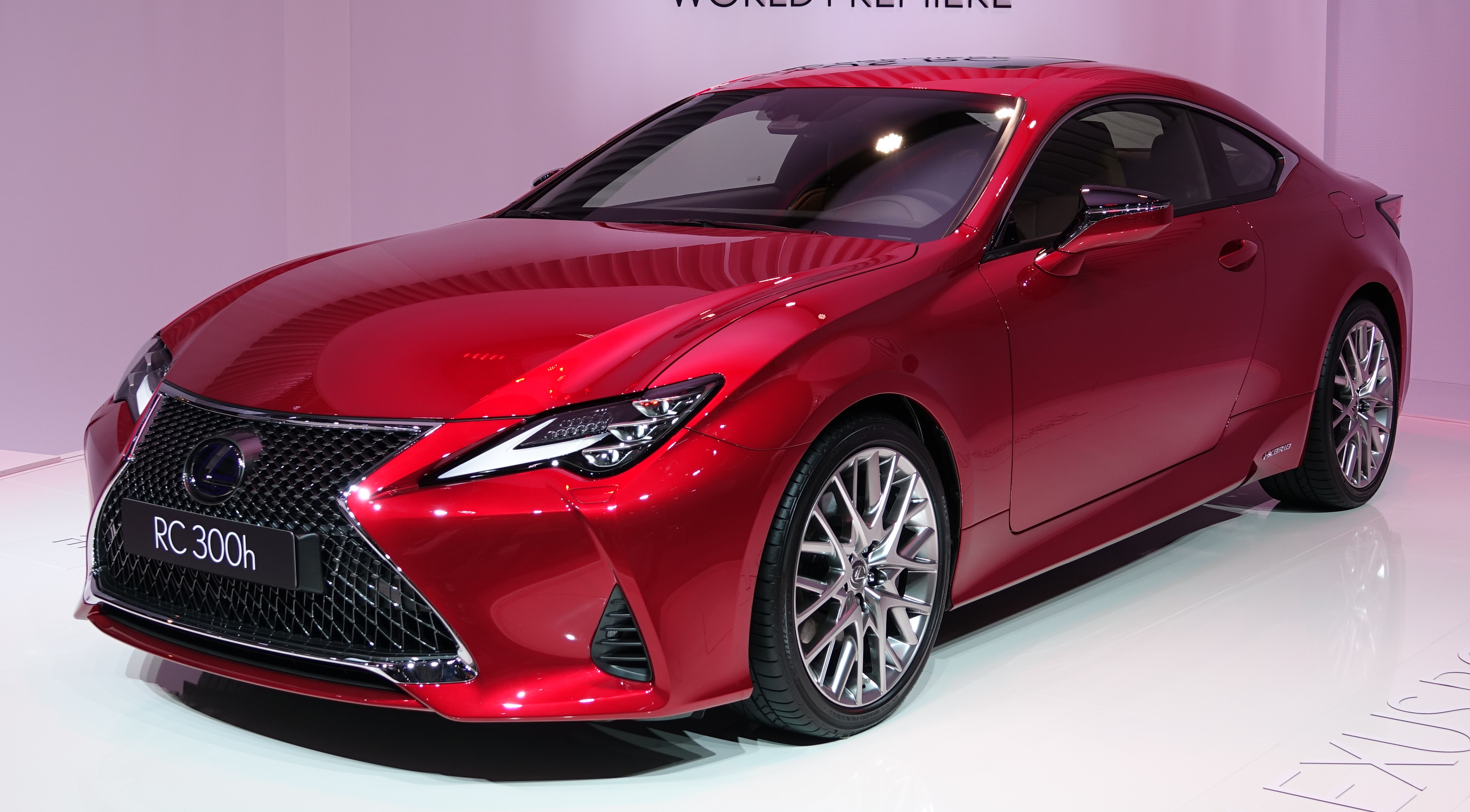
Lexus RC
