= ELAS (disambiguation) =

Greek People's Liberation Army, mostly known by its acronym ELAS, was the military arm of EAM, the largest Greek Resistance organization during World War II Axis occupation of Greece.

ELAS or Elas can also refer to:

- Greek Left Alliance, a Greek political party founded in 2026
- Hellenic Police
- The Equitable Life Assurance Society, a life insurance company in the United Kingdom
- Elas, a planet in the Star Trek episode "Elaan of Troyius"

== See also ==
- Hellas
- Ela (disambiguation)
- Hellenic (disambiguation)
