= MEBEA =

MEBEA was an important Greek vehicle manufacturer, producer of light trucks, passenger automobiles, motorcycles, motorbike engines, agricultural machinery and bicycles.

A classic MEBEA Sport (1961)

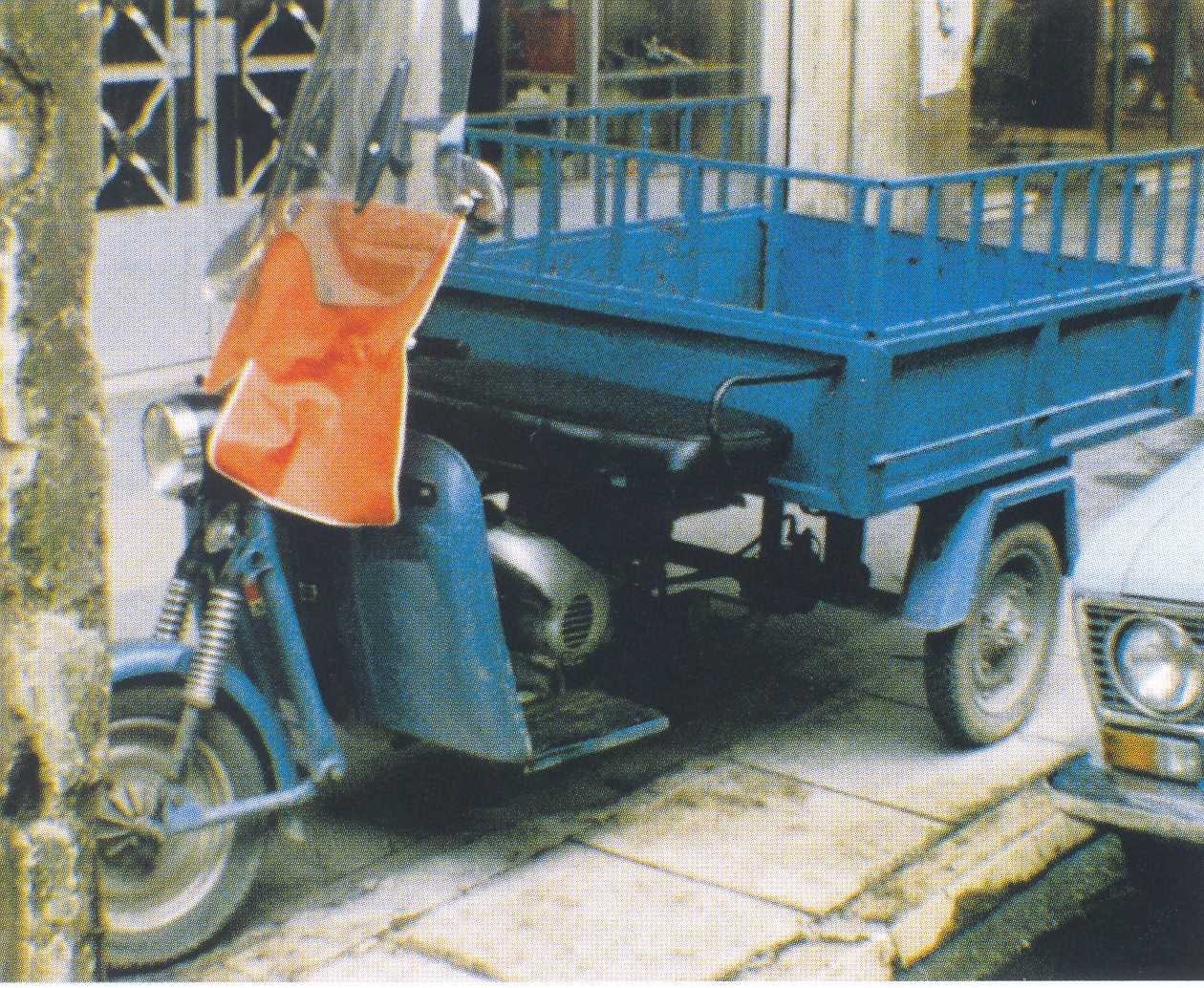
Half-scooter and half-truck: MEBEA flooded Greece with this light pick-up truck type in the 1960s and 1970s (also available with cab). Similar types were produced by other Greek companies.

== Activities ==
MEBEA was founded in Athens in 1960 by the merger of two companies assembling (progressively manufacturing) motorbikes since 1954, and its initials stand for Μεσογειακαί Επιχειρήσεις Βιομηχανίας, Εμπορίου και Αντιπροσωπειών (Messogiakai Epiheiriseis Biomihanias, Emporiou kai Antiprosopeion - Mediterranean Enterprises for Industry, Commerce and Dealerships). It grew to be a significant Greek company with two factories in the north of Athens.

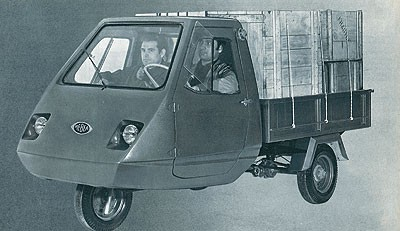
MEBEA ST150 (1970)

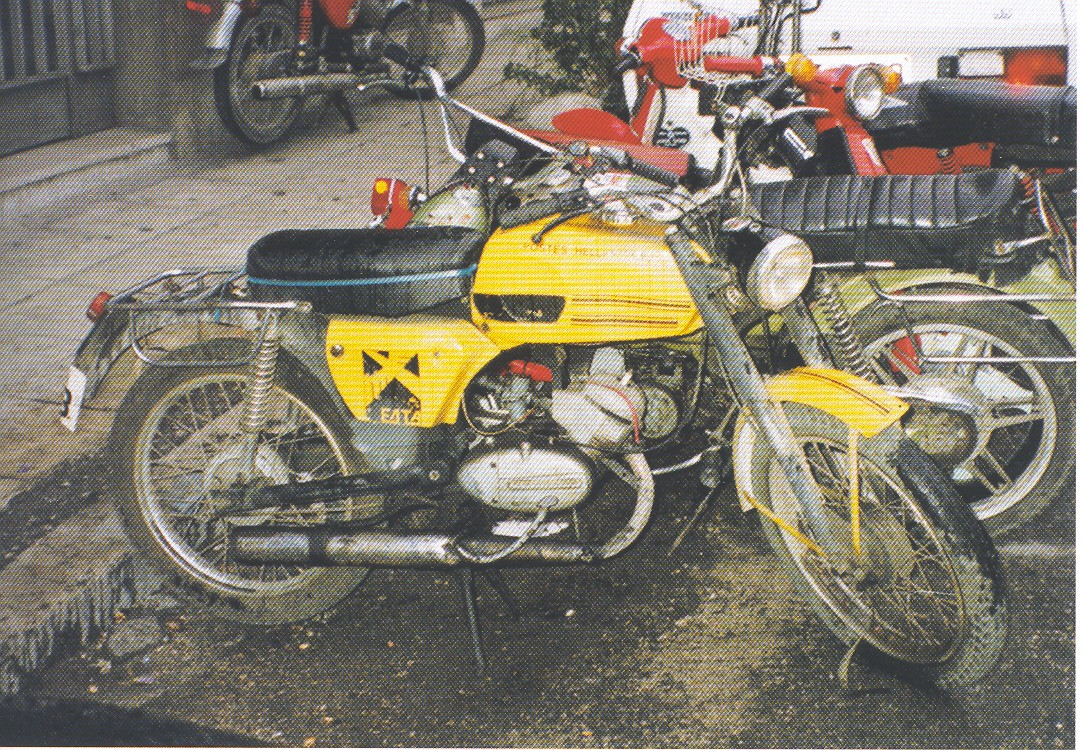
Used by the Hellenic Postal Service: MEBEA Hermes (1970)

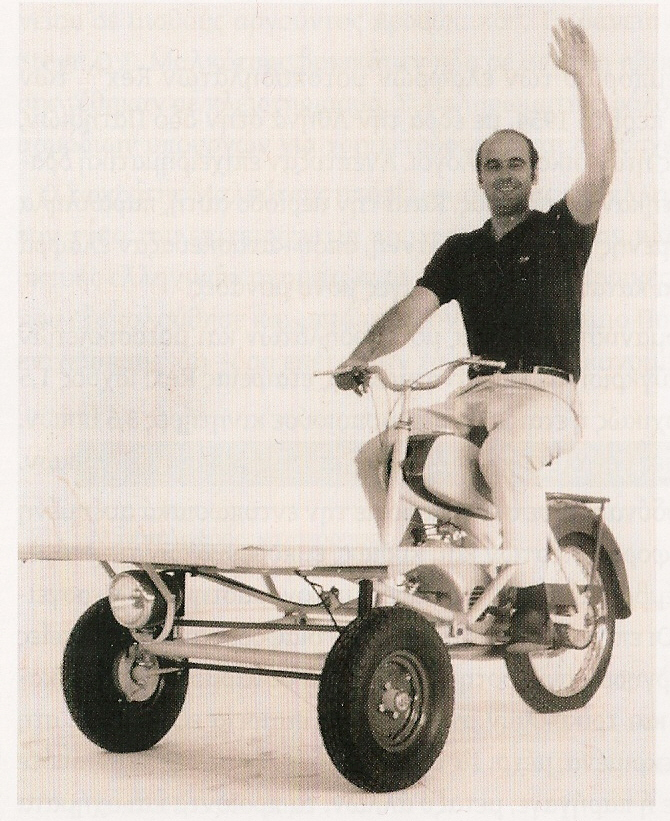
Designed for Asia: MEBEA FL (1971)

Its most successful products were light three-wheeler trucks with 50 cc Zündapp engines, that became a common sight all over the country for almost three decades and were exported (in commercial and passenger variants) to African and Asian markets. Its mopeds and motorcycles (models including the Junior, Apollon and Hermes) mostly used Zündapp engines as well as MEBEA's own (built under Minarelli licence), and some were used, among others, by the Greek Postal Service and the Telecommunications Organization.

Apart from the previously mentioned vehicles that were of its own development (MEBEA technology was also employed by another Greek motorcycle and three-wheeler manufacturer, Mego), the company cooperated with Reliant of Britain, starting licence production of the latter's TW9 heavier three-wheeler truck in 1970 (using a 1.2 L Triumph engine) and Robin three-wheel passenger car in 1974, while the MEBEA Fox automobile was presented as a joint development.

In addition to the motorized vehicle construction mentioned above, other activities during MEBEA history included motorbike engine production (on Italian designs) for use in its lighter models as well as for export, and the operation of the bicycle division producing a range of bicycle models.

== Development and fate of the Fox model ==
In 1979 MEBEA introduced the Fox light utility vehicle, in line with contemporary Greek 'fashion' for such vehicles like the Pony by Namco, the Farma by MAVA-Renault, and others that appeared later. The Fox was originally designed and built in prototype form by MEBEA itself on modified Reliant Kitten basis, but the final development for type certification was done in collaboration with Reliant in order to bypass the difficulties imposed by Greek law for a "passenger car" production permit.

The company faced problems in the early 1980s when certain Asian markets were lost, but the final blow came when Greek law stopped 'favouring' light passenger-utility vehicles, essentially killing the Fox (along with about half a dozen similar Greek automobiles) which until then had accomplished modest sales, reaching about 3000 units. In 1983 production of the Fox was terminated (it then started in Britain, though, by Reliant itself), and soon MEBEA, a company associated with a wide variety of light vehicles that had almost become a part of Greek culture, ceased to exist.

== Models ==
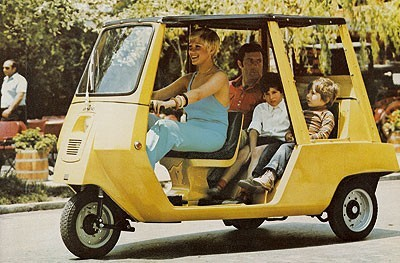
Another model built for Asia: MEBEA Bingo (1972)

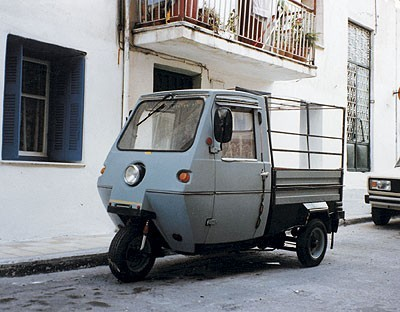
A Greek workhorse: MEBEA 206 (1977)

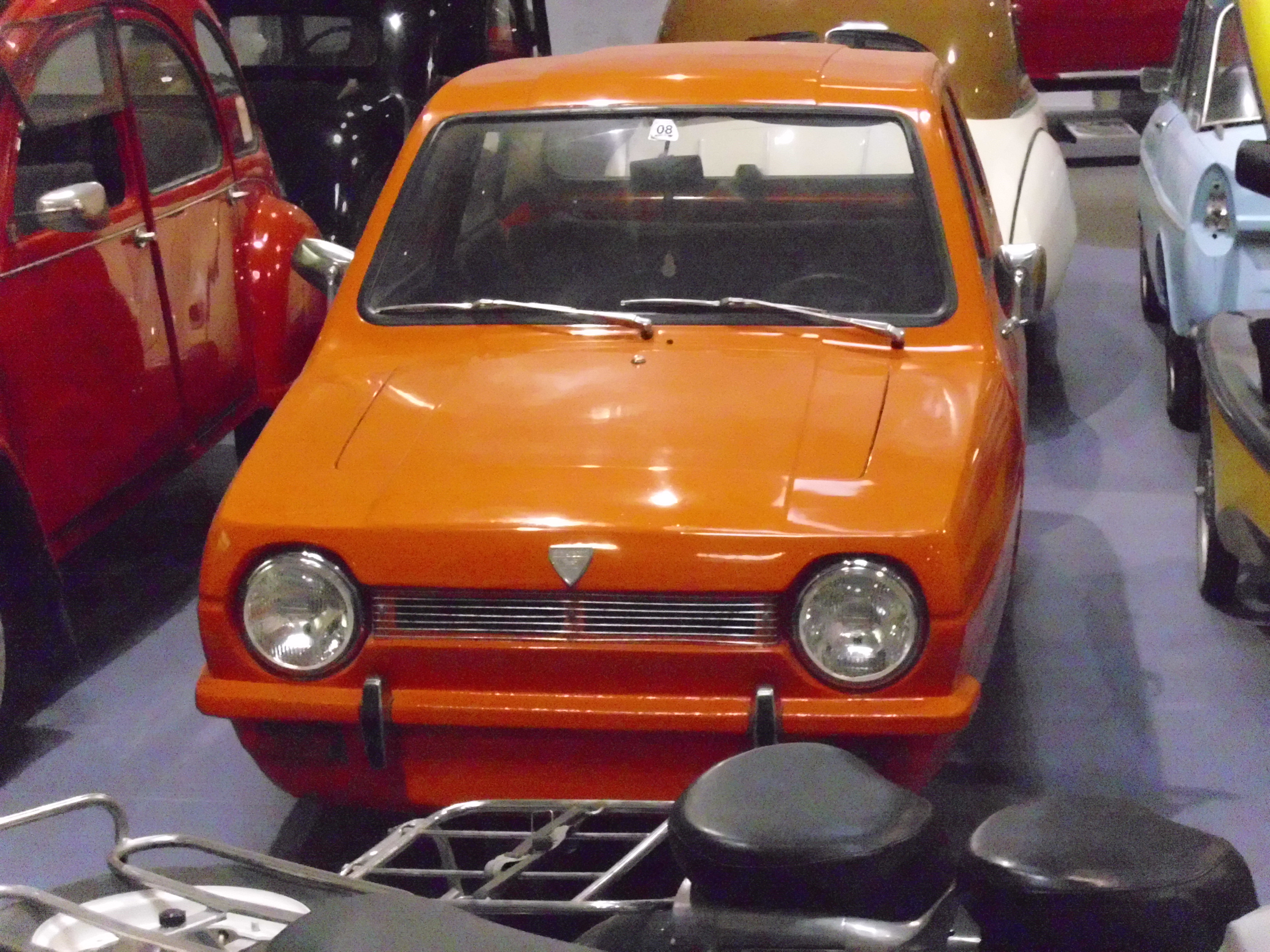
MEBEA Robin model (1974–1978), Thessaloniki Science Center and Technology Museum

This is a list of the main motorized models produced by MEBEA.

=== Agricultural machinery ===
- AT-36 walking tractor with Sachs engine, produced 1965–1967.

=== Motorcycles ===
Several models were produced, including:

- Sport & Super Sport 50 cc motorcycle models, produced between 1961 and 1970.
- 50-Zündapp 50 cc motorcycle (based on Zündapp model), produced from the mid-1960s to the early 1970s.
- Hermes 50 cc motorcycle, produced for a number of years, from 1970.
- Apollon 50 cc motorcycle based on the Hermes, produced for a number of years, from 1970.
- Komet 50 cc motorcycle.
- Junior, one of several 50 cc moped models, produced for a number of years, from 1972.
- Europino series of 50 cc mopeds (Under Italian Motron licence) produced 1974–1982.

=== Light three-wheel trucks (“motorcycle” steering and controls) ===
- First generation, produced in large numbers, available with or without cabin, 1962–1974.
- Second generation, available with or without cabin, 1974–1977.
- Third generation (model 206), produced in large numbers, available with or without cabin, 1977–1983.
- FL, light truck with trunk in the front, produced for export to Asia, 1971.

=== Three-wheel trucks (“automobile” steering and controls) ===
- ST150 light truck with 300 kg payload, 1970–1977.
- Reliant 1200/TW 9B truck with 800 kg payload (Reliant licence), 1970–1976.

=== Light three-wheel passenger vehicles (“motorcycle” steering and controls) ===
- Bingo, produced for export to Asia (assembled in Indonesia and Pakistan), introduced in 1972.

=== Passenger automobiles ===
- Reliant Robin three-wheeler automobile (Reliant licence), 1974–1978.
- Fox passenger-utility automobile (based on a MEBEA prototype and developed jointly with Reliant), 1979–1983.
