= Driver monitoring system =

Vehicle safety system

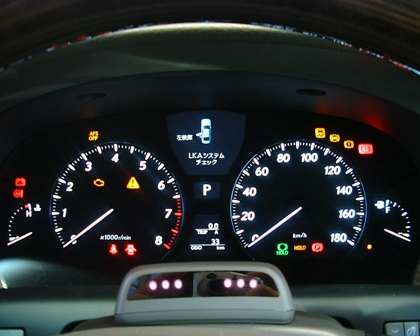
The driver monitoring system on the LS 600h.

The Driver Monitoring System (DMS), also known as driver attention monitor, is a vehicle safety system to assess the driver's alertness and warn the driver if needed and eventually apply the brakes. It was first introduced by Toyota in 2006 for its and Lexus' latest models. It was first offered in Japan on the GS 450h. The system's functions co-operate with the pre-collision system (PCS). The system uses infrared sensors to monitor driver attentiveness. Specifically, the driver monitoring system includes a CCD camera placed on the steering column which tracks the face, via infrared LED detectors. If the driver is not paying attention to the road ahead and a dangerous situation is detected, the system will warn the driver by flashing lights, warning sounds. If no action is taken, the vehicle will apply the brakes (a warning alarm will sound followed by a brief automatic application of the braking system). This system is said to be the first of its kind.

In 2008, the Toyota Crown system went further and can detect if the driver is becoming sleepy by monitoring the eyelids.

In 2017, Cadillac released their Super Cruise system which allowed hands free driving at highway speeds on specially mapped highways. In order to ensure that the driver continued to pay attention to the road, they included Seeing Machines DMS. This was initially available only in the CT6.

In 2019, BMW introduced an Extended Traffic Jam Assistant System in almost its entire range of car models, allowing hands-free and pedal-free driving on highways at speeds up to 37 mph (60 km/h), i.e., when in slow-moving traffic such as during morning or afternoon commutes.

== Vehicles ==
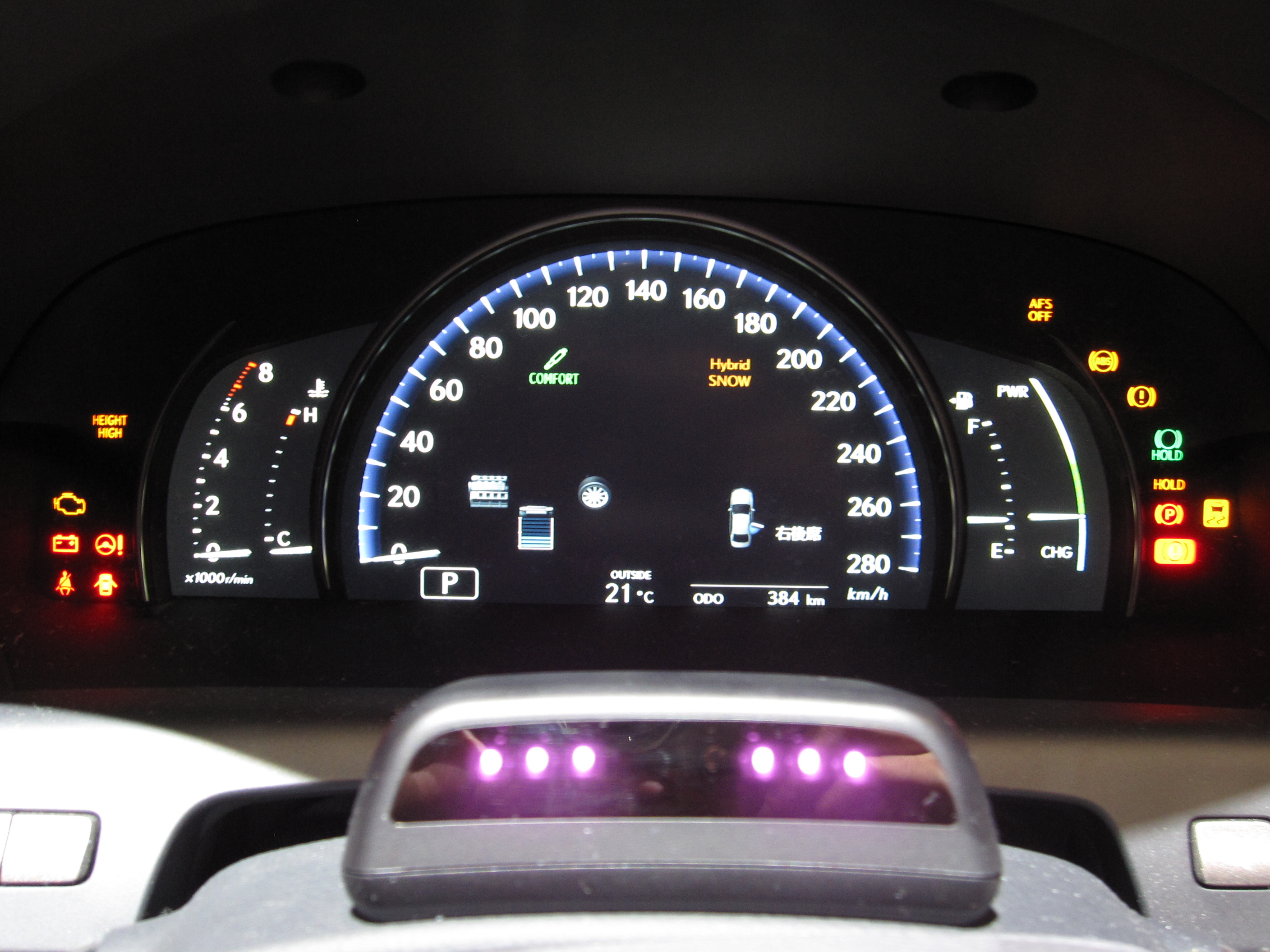
2010 driver monitoring system with LCD night vision cluster

Lexus models that have adopted the Driver Monitoring System to date, listed by model year:

- 2006-2011 Lexus GS 450h (not available as configured in the US market)
- 2010-2017 Lexus LS 460
- 2008-2017 Lexus LS 600h
- 2010 Lexus HS 250h
- 2010-2019 Lexus GX 460

Toyota models that have adopted the Driver Monitoring System:

- 2008 Toyota Crown Hybrid (includes drowsiness detection)

General Motors first demonstrated their Super Cruise hands free driving using Seeing Machines Driver Monitoring System in the Cadillac CT6, soon to be rolled out across 22 models.

- 2017 Cadillac CT6
- 2021 Cadillac Escalade

BMW models have adopted driver monitoring system in 2019 in the optional "BMW Live Cockpit Professional" available in:

- BMW 1 Series (F40)
- BMW 2 Series (F44)
- BMW 3 Series (G20)
- BMW 5 Series (G30)
- BMW 6 Series (G32)
- BMW 7 Series (G11)
- BMW 8 Series (G15)
- BMW X3 (G01)
- BMW X4 (G02)
- BMW X5 (G05)
- BMW X6 (G06)
- BMW X7 (G07)
- BMW Z4 (G29)
- BMW iX
- BMW iX3

The infrared cameras are in the top middle part of the instrument cluster, part of iDrive BMW Live Cockpit and driven by BMW Operating System 7.0.

Ford use the Seeing Machines DMS with infrared LEDs in a module located on the steering column behind the steering wheel as part of their active drive assist hands free driving "BlueCruise" in the 2021 Ford Mustang Mach-E and the 2021 F-150.

- Ford Mustang Mach-E
- Ford F-Series

Mercedes-Benz have integrated the camera from their Seeing Machines driver monitoring system with the 3D instrument display, head-up display, lighting and car controls in the 2021 Mercedes-Benz S-Class (W223) model.

=== Chinese Manufacturers ===
- NIO ET7 and EL7 - infrared cameras and camera near the instrument cluster.
- XPeng P7 with Navigation Guided Pilot (NGP).

== Regulation ==
In European Union, regulation (EU) 2019/2144 regulates the driver monitoring system.

driver drowsiness and attention warning means a system that assesses the driver’s alertness through vehicle systems analysis and warns the driver if needed

— regulation (EU) 2019/2144

Driver drowsiness and attention warning and advanced driver distraction warning systems shall be designed in such a way that those systems do not continuously record nor retain any data other than what is necessary in relation to the purposes for which they were collected or otherwise processed within the closed-loop system. Furthermore, those data shall not be accessible or made available to third parties at any time and shall be immediately deleted after processing. Those systems shall also be designed to avoid overlap and shall not prompt the driver separately and concurrently or in a confusing manner where one action triggers both systems.

— regulation (EU) 2019/2144

== See also ==
- Driver drowsiness detection
