= Sotiris Kovos =

Greek automobile designer (born 1965)

Sotiris Kovos is a Greek automobile designer born in Athens in 1965. He studied in Greece and the United Kingdom and became known after his design of Toyota Yaris, introduced in 1999. He is also responsible for a number of concept cars as well as the Lexus SC 430 (Z40) convertible. Since 2002 he has designed scooters and motorcycles for Nipponia, a motorcycle company based in Athens, Greece.
