= Hellas =

Hellas, or Ellas refers to Greece as a whole, as the main name its modern inhabitants know it by.

Hellas, or Ellas may also refer to:

== Places in Greece ==
- Ἑλλάς (Ellás), genitive Ἑλλάδος (Elládos), an ancient Greek toponym used to refer to:
  - The region of Achaea Phthiotis in Thessaly
  - According to legend, a city in Phthiotis, founded by Hellene.
  - Continental Greece, as opposed to the Peloponnese peninsula and the Greek islands
  - A name for all lands inhabited by Hellenes, i.e. all of ancient Greece, including the Greek colonies
  - Hellas (theme), a Byzantine province in southern Greece

== Sports clubs ==
- Hellas Verona F.C., an Italian football (soccer) club based in Verona
- SoIK Hellas, sports club in Stockholm, Sweden
- South Melbourne FC, a football (soccer) club formerly known as South Melbourne Hellas
- West Adelaide Soccer Club, a football (soccer) club formerly known as West Adelaide Hellas
- Hellas Syros F.C., a football (soccer) club in the island of Syros.

== On Mars ==
- Hellas quadrangle, a region of Mars
- Hellas Planitia, a plain within the impact basin associated with the albedo feature Hellas on Mars
- Hellas Montes, a mountain range on Mars

== Ships ==
- Greek frigate Hellas (1826–1831), the first flagship of the modern Hellenic Navy
- Greek steamship Hellas (1859–1906)
- SS Taroona (1935–1989), an Australian transport ship of World War II; later sold and converted into a cruise ship named the Hellas

== Other uses ==
- Empire of Nicaea, a Byzantine rump state
- Hellas (poem), by Percy Bysshe Shelley
- Ellas (TV series), a Mexican telenovela
- AK Hellas, a Greek truck manufacturer
- Hellas (personification), feminine representation of Greece
- "Ellas", a song by Tini from Un Mechón de Pelo

== See also ==
- ELAS
- ELAS (disambiguation)
- Autokinitoviomihania Ellados
- Greece (disambiguation)
- Helles
- Hellenic (disambiguation)
