= Mego (motorbikes) =

Mego (ΜΕΓΚΟ) was a Greek light vehicle manufacturer, based in Trikala. Its first products, launched in 1947, were utility tricycles. In 1951, it began manufacturing motorized utility tricycles with 50–100cc engines and an unconventional design in which the solo wheel was located at the rear.

== About ==
The company's first products were branded Nigo, a named derived from that of its founder, Nikos Gorgolis. In 1962, it was partly sold to MEBEA and was renamed Mego (from MEBEA and Gorgolis); the change in ownership was accompanied by the introduction of conventional light three-wheel trucks. In 1967, the Gorgolis family regained total ownership of the company but retained the Mego name. Mego subsequently designed and built a large number of 50cc moped and motorcycle types and light 50cc three-wheel trucks, using mainly Sachs engines, as well as bicycles. A 125cc motorcycle was launched in 1968. Mego's moped and motorcycle models, featuring innovative designs, included the 50S series, the EK, the Libra, the Viva and the particularly novel GP50 Carrera.

Mego's products were fairly popular in Greece, where the company's customers included the police, the Hellenic Post and the Hellenic Telecommunications Organization. Mego also exported its products, especially to the Netherlands. The company faced problems in the late 1980s, mainly due to competition by second-hand imports. Motorcycle production ceased in 1988 but the company remained in operation until 1992, servicing its products with parts, etc. Subsequently, it was renamed Gorgolis S.A., focusing on motorcycle import and distribution.

== Nipponia ==
Since 1992 the company also branched in a new venture, creating subsidiaries in Japan, the Dominican Republic, Venezuela, and China, marketing and selling motorcycles. The brand Nipponia was established (as a reference to Japanese-style excellence) for a series of Greek-designed, Chinese-built motorcycles sold in several countries. A world headquarters of Nipponia was subsequently established in Athens responsible for design, engineering, marketing and quality control for motorcycles built in Shanghai, China. Its latest range is designed by Sotiris Kovos (designer of the Toyota Yaris and other Toyota models) and currently marketed in Europe.

== Gallery ==
The Mego 250S 3-wheeler was originally introduced in 1962 and produced, with upgrades (with or without cab), for 25 years

The Mego 50S (1967 model pictured) was Mego's "classic" motorcycle

Mego EK, a popular moped introduced in 1971

Mego 50S (1980 version)

The successor to 50S: Mego GP50 Carrera (1983)

The Mego GT50 (1985)
