= Lexus RX =

Luxury crossover SUV model from Lexus

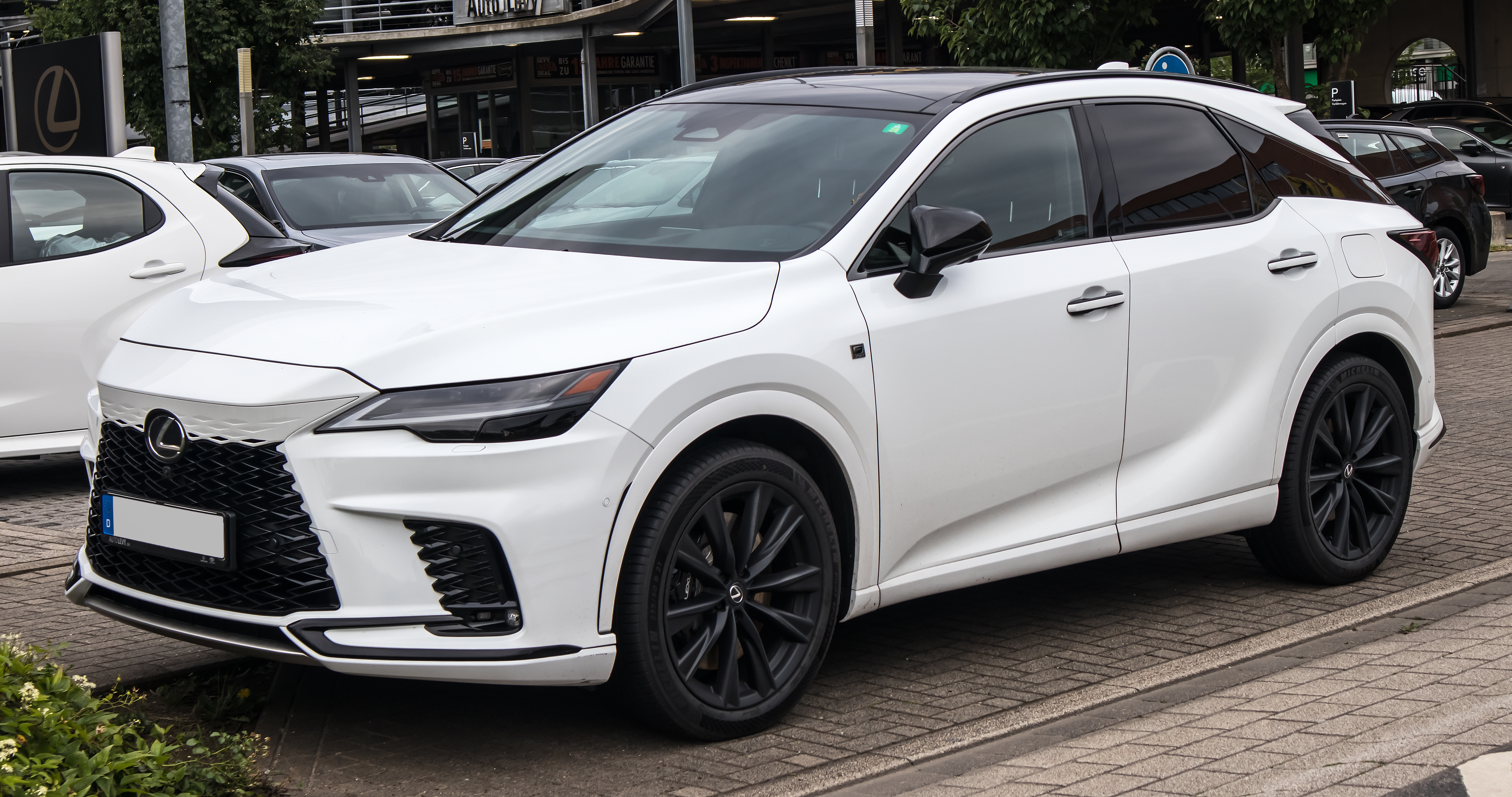
- Lexus RX 500h F Sport Performance (TALH17, Germany)

Overview
- Manufacturer: Toyota
- Also called: Toyota Harrier (Japan, 1997–2013)
- Production: December 1997 – present
- Model years: 1998–present

Body and chassis
- Class: Compact luxury crossover SUV (1997–2003); Mid-size luxury crossover SUV (2003–present)
- Body style: 5-door SUV
- Layout: Front-engine, front-wheel drive; Front-engine, four-wheel drive
- Chassis: Unibody

Chronology
- Successor: Toyota Harrier (XU60) (Japan, for XU30 model); Lexus TX (RX L)

The Lexus RX (Japanese: レクサス・RX, Hepburn: Rekusasu RX) is a luxury crossover SUV sold since 1998 by Lexus, a luxury division of Toyota. Originally released in its home market of Japan in late 1997 as the Toyota Harrier, export sales began in March 1998 as the Lexus RX.

Considered as the first luxury crossover SUV by many sources, five generations of the RX have been produced to date, the first being compact in size, and the latter classified as mid-size. Both front- and four-wheel drive configurations have been used on the RX series, and several gasoline powertrain options, including V6 engines and hybrid systems, have been offered. In the Lexus model lineup, the RX sits below the larger Lexus LX (marketed as the Toyota Land Cruiser body-on-frame SUVs outside North America, respectively), and below the body-on-frame, but also mid-size GX SUV. The name "RX" stands for "Radiant Crossover". It has also been labelled as "Recreational Cross Country" in some markets. The RX's current Toyota counterpart is the Highlander/Kluger; past counterparts included the Harrier and Venza.

The first-generation RX 300, fitted with a 3.0-liter V6 engine, began sales in 1998. The Japanese market Harrier released in 1997 also offered a 2.2-liter inline-four, later uprated to 2.4 liters. The second-generation RX 300 (3.0-liter V6) and RX 330 (3.3-liter V6) models went on sale in 2003, with both variants supplanted by the more powerful RX 350 (3.5-liter V6) in 2006. Like the previous series, a 2.4-liter inline-four engine was sold alongside the 3.0-liter V6 in the Japanese market Harrier. In 2005, a hybridized gasoline-electric version of the 3.3-liter second-generation model was made available as the RX 400h in export markets and as the Harrier Hybrid in Japan. For the third generation released in 2009, both RX 350 (3.5-liter V6) and RX 450h (3.5-liter V6 hybrid) models were initially offered, with an entry-level RX 270 (2.7-liter inline-four) offered by Lexus in some Asian markets, including in Japan, since 2010. Since the release of the third generation, Japanese sales have occurred under the RX name as opposed to Harrier as had been the case previously. In the fourth generation, a turbocharged (2.0-liter inline-four) RX 200t/300 model was introduced to replace the previous 2.7-liter unit.

The RX has been assembled at Toyota Motor Kyushu since launch. The RX and RX Hybrid were the first Lexus models to be built outside Japan, with North American market versions produced at the Toyota Motor Manufacturing Canada plant in Cambridge, Ontario beginning 2003 (RX) and expanded in 2014 (RX Hybrid). Hybrid transaxles are built at the Kokura plant in Kitakyushu, Fukuoka since 2009.

== First generation (XU10; 1998) ==
First generation
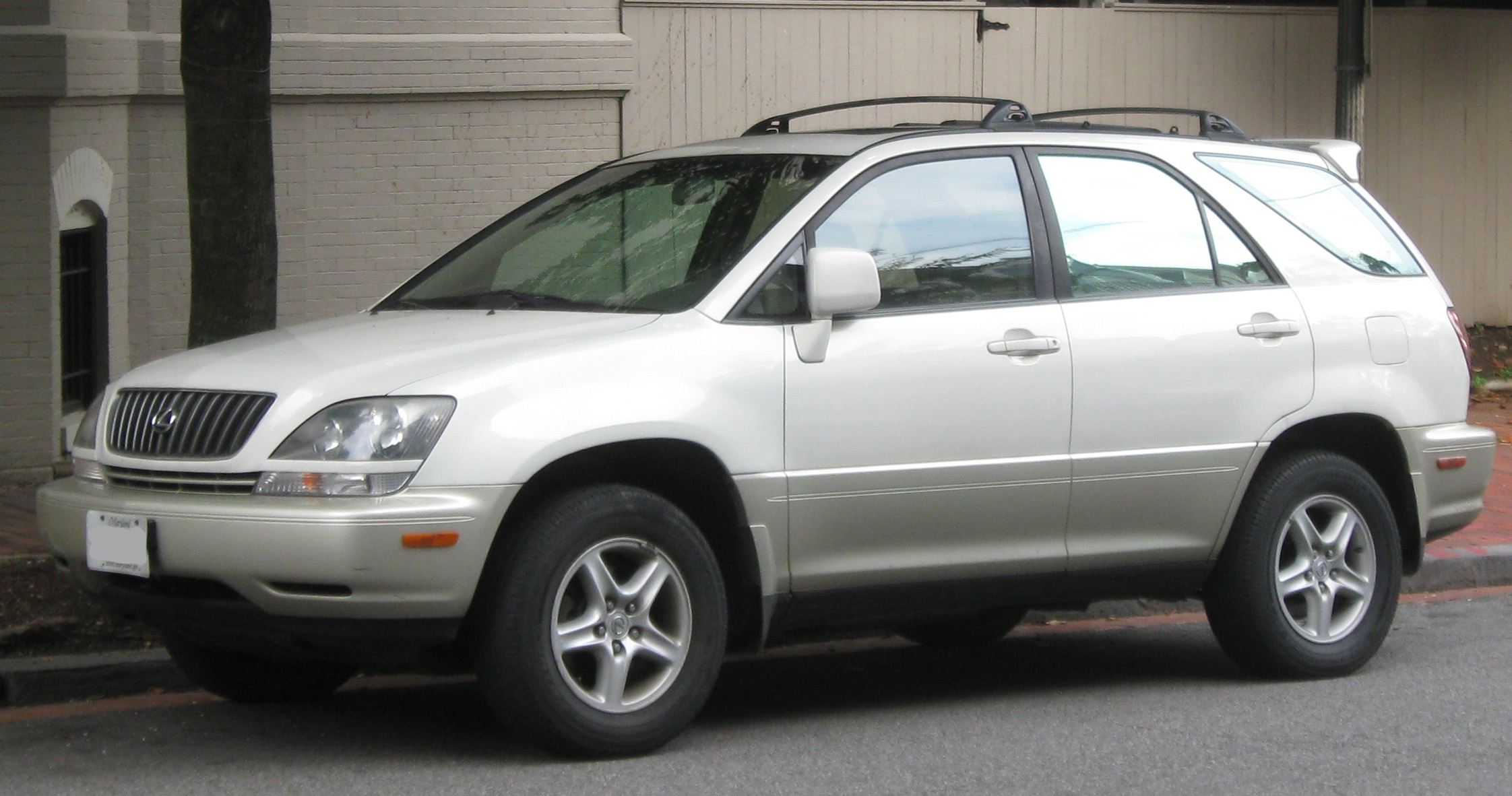
- Pre-facelift Lexus RX 300 (US)

Overview
- Model code: XU10
- Also called: Toyota Harrier (Japan)
- Production: December 1997 – January 2003 (Toyota Harrier); January 1998 – January 2003 (Lexus RX)
- Model years: 1999–2003 (Lexus RX)
- Assembly: Japan: Miyawaka, Fukuoka (TMK)
- Designer: Makoto Oshima (1995)

Body and chassis
- Related: Lexus ES/Toyota Windom (XV20)

Powertrain
- Engine: Gasoline: 2.2 L 5S-FE I4; 2.4 L 2AZ-FE I4; 3.0 L 1MZ-FE V6
- Transmission: 4-speed U140E/F automatic

Dimensions
- Wheelbase: 2,615 mm (103.0 in)
- Length: 4,580 mm (180.3 in)
- Width: 1,815 mm (71.5 in)
- Height: 1,670 mm (65.7 in)

=== 1998–2000 ===
The idea concept behind the RX—a crossover between a luxury sedan and SUV—started in 1993 when it was hypothesized by TMS (Toyota Motor Sales) and Toyota Motor executives during a luncheon in Nagoya. By 1994, that vehicle was officially proposed by TMS executives at product planning meeting in Toyota City, Japan and put into development. In December 1995, the final design directed under designer Makoto Oshima was approved for production, and prototypes later went into testing in 1996. In Japan, the company was selling the Toyota Caldina which offered AWD capability and a spacious interior.

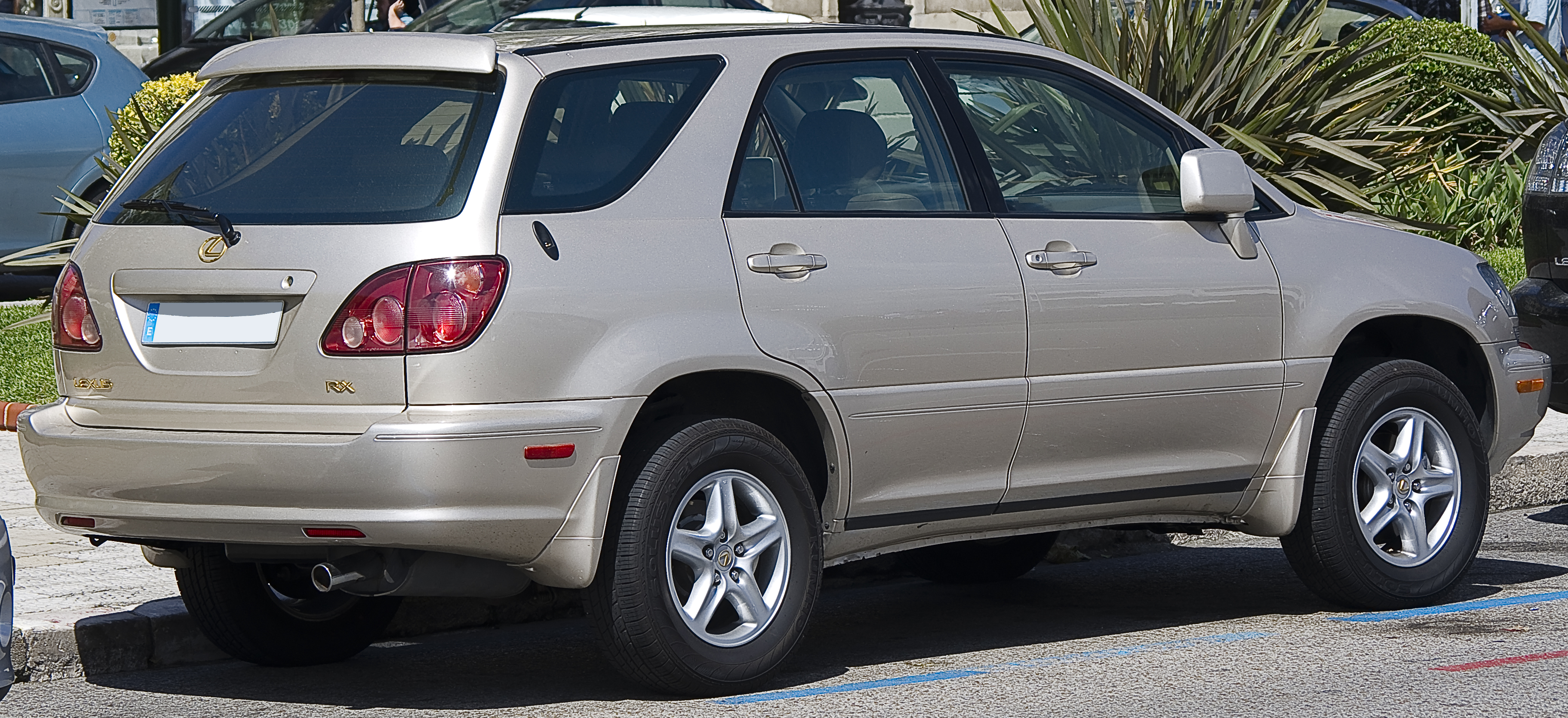
Lexus RX 300 (US spec)

Prior to the RX public debut, a concept sport utility vehicle, the SLV, previewed the model at the Chicago Auto Show on 9 February 1997. The SLV name stood for Sport Luxury Vehicle. The production-ready concept combined the characteristics of an SUV, wagon, and sedan, and featured high-ground clearance and an elevated seating position. The concept's overall design intent was to be commonly used for suburban driving. At the debut of the concept vehicle, it was reported that the crossover was to be based on the ES 300 sedan, and would go into production with an entry-level price of over US$30,000.

The RX was built on a unibody chassis. Its exterior design was not typical of existing four-door vehicles at its introduction. Among design features, the vehicle featured front triangular quarter-windows, door-mounted side mirrors, a rear liftgate with top-mounted spoiler, and translucent front and rear light covers with round lenses. The exterior color scheme was two-tone, with the bumper and lower body-side cladding a grey color. The RX 300 possessed a drag coefficient of Cd=0.36. The first-generation Lexus RX was built in Kyushu, Japan.

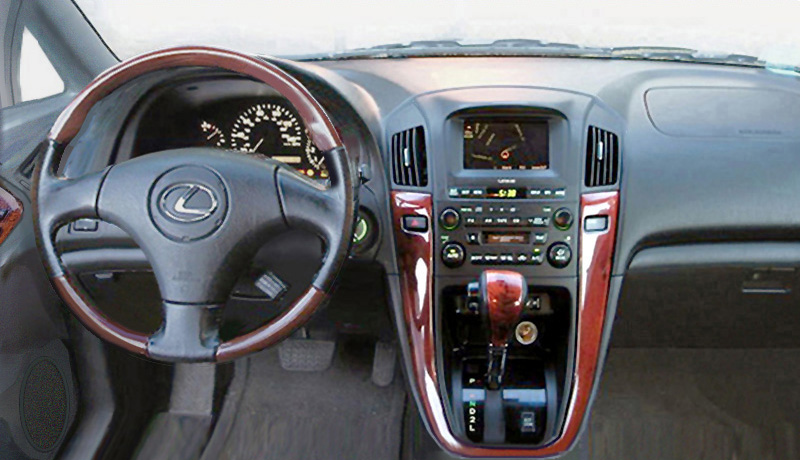
Interior

The V6-powered model was available in front-wheel drive (MCU10) and all-wheel drive (MCU15) form, which comprised all RX 300 sales in export markets from March 1998 to 2003, and Harrier V6 sales in Japan from 1997 to 2003. The 3.0 L 1MZ-FE V6 was rated at 164 kW (220 hp) and 301 N⋅m (222 lb⋅ft). The transmission, a 4-speed automatic unit, offered a "Snow" mode which started the vehicle in second gear for better traction in adverse weather conditions. For the RX 300, a 240-watt, 7-speaker Pioneer sound system was standard, while a premium Nakamichi customized sound system was available as an option. Interior features further included Walnut wood trim and an optional in-dash six-CD changer. The overall RX 300 concept, which directed SUV qualities to an on-road vehicle, was based on market research which found that merely 7 percent of SUV owners drove off-road. The RX 300 interior featured leather trim, two rows of seating, and a rear cargo area which could be concealed beneath a tonneau cover. The center dashboard was dominated by a central liquid crystal display (LCD) multi-information screen for audio, climate, and performance data (including fuel economy), along with a U-shaped wood trim piece and a pair of air conditioning vents. The gear shift was mounted at the base of the center console, thus leaving open space below for additional storage space, legroom, or movement to the passenger-side seat. The rear seats could be adjusted forward and back, as well as fold flat for increased cargo room. Total cargo volume with the seats folded was 130 cu ft (3.68 m^{3}).

Safety features included driver and passenger front airbags, front seat-mounted side torso airbags, anti-lock brakes, side impact door beams, daytime running lights, and five headrests as standard. Vehicle Stability Control, an electronic stability program, was optional at the RX 300's debut, and became standard in 2000. The Insurance Institute for Highway Safety (IIHS) rated the RX 300 "Good" overall in their frontal offset crash test.

=== 2000–2003 ===
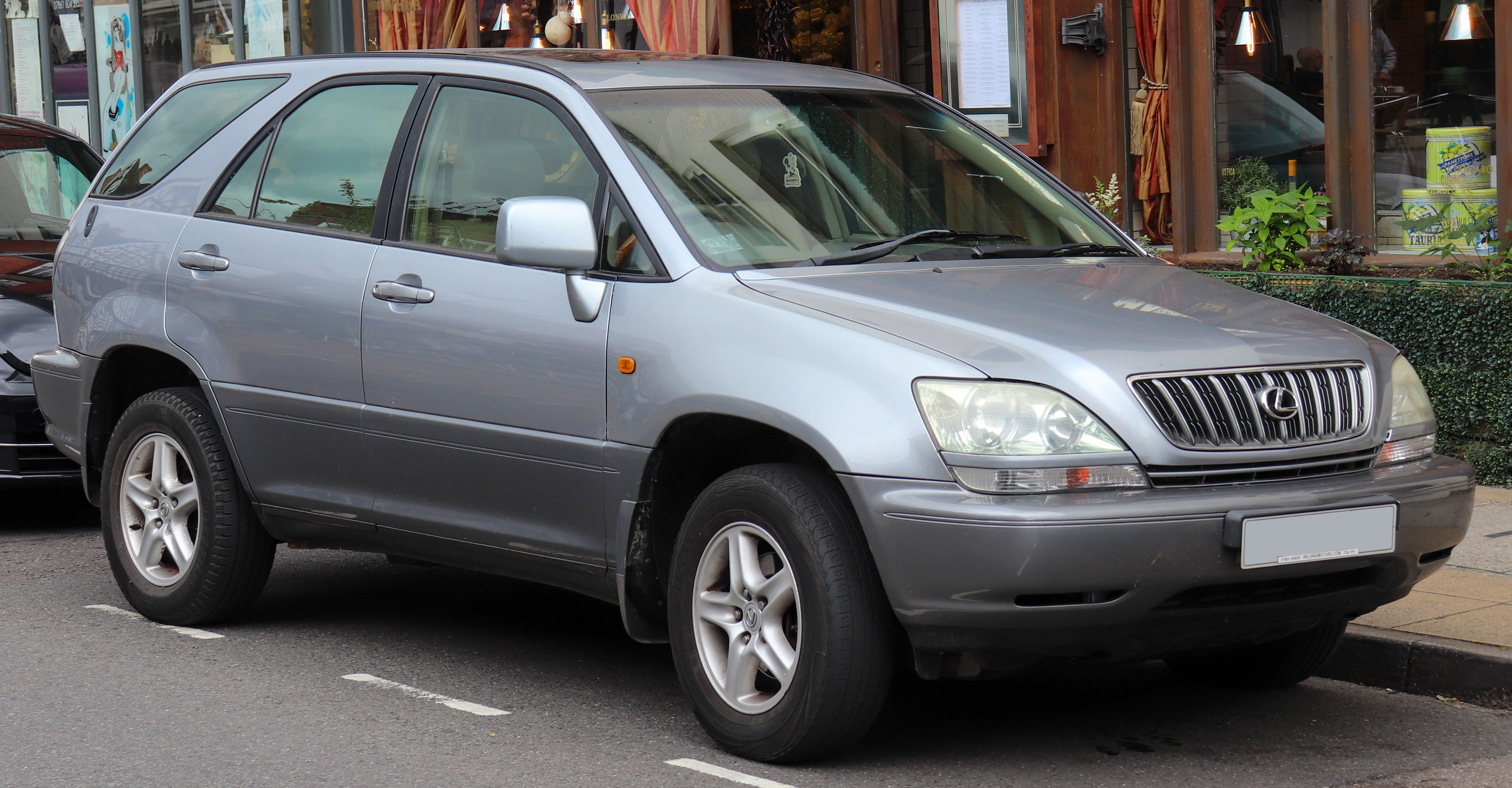

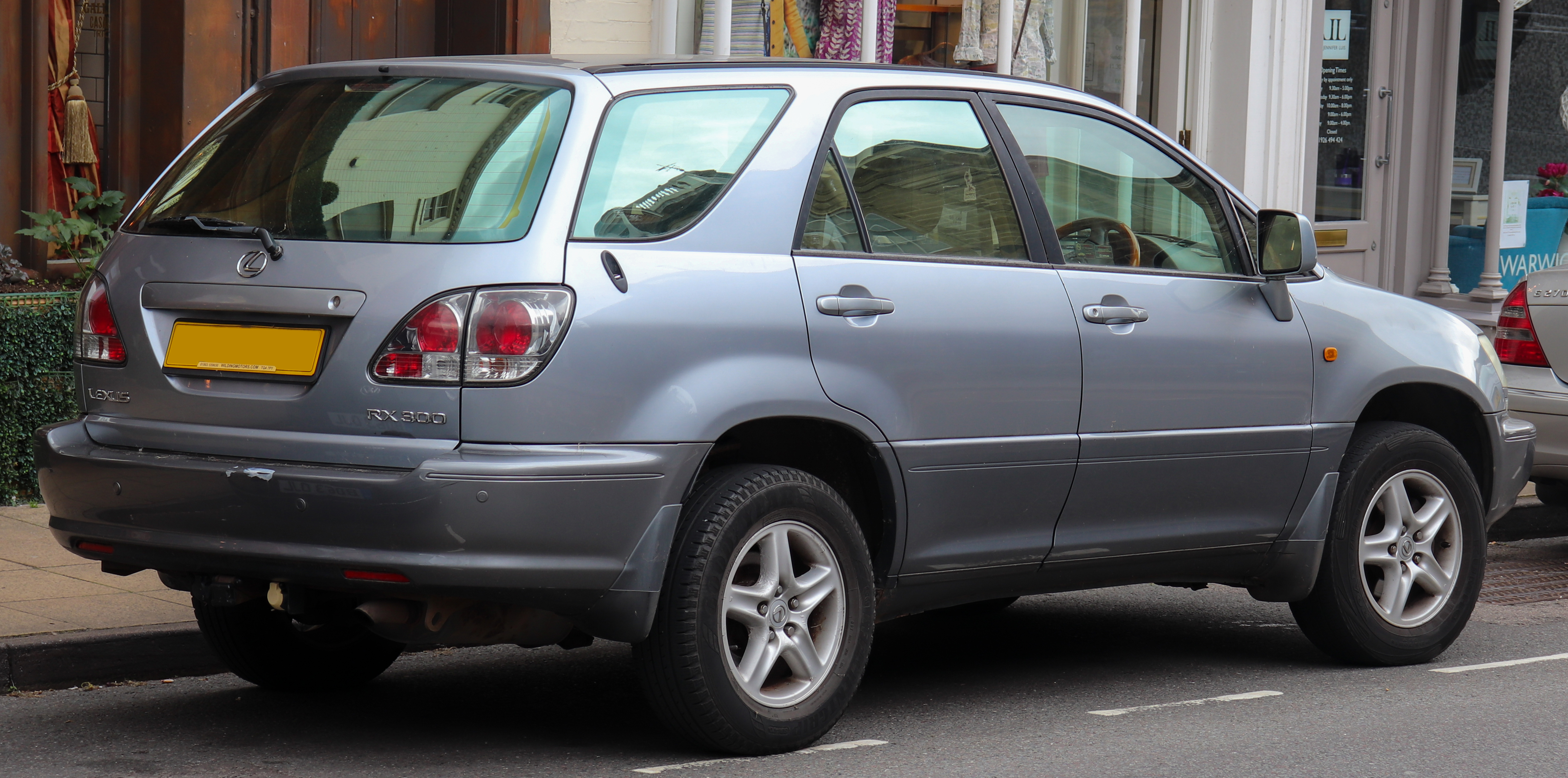
RX 300 (facelift)

In 2000, for the 2001 model year, the RX 300 was refreshed with revised headlights and tail lights, along with the option of high-intensity discharge (HID) headlamps. The interior also gained the option of a DVD-based navigation system. A burgundy exterior color, Venetian Red Pearl, was only offered on 1999–2000 year models.

In 2001, a limited edition "Silversport" was offered that included a monochromatic paint scheme in Millennium Silver or Black with an all black interior and perforated leather seats. Exclusively for 2002, Lexus introduced the limited RX 300 "Coach Edition," featuring perforated leather trim in the interior, honeycomb grille, Coach badging on the exterior and interior, and a set of Coach luggage.

Awards won by the first-generation Lexus RX include most appealing luxury SUV by J.D. Power and Associates in 1998, Motor Trend Sport/Utility of the Year for 1999, Money magazine's Best Deal on the Road in the SUV class in 1999, and Kelley Blue Book's Best to Hold Value Award in 1999, 2000, and 2001.

The RX 300 sold over 370,000 units in its five years on the market. It was successful in terms of sales, and became the best-selling Lexus model shortly after its introduction. Its popularity contributed to the growth of the premium crossover SUV market, with several rival makes launching competing models in response to the RX 300.

=== Toyota Harrier ===
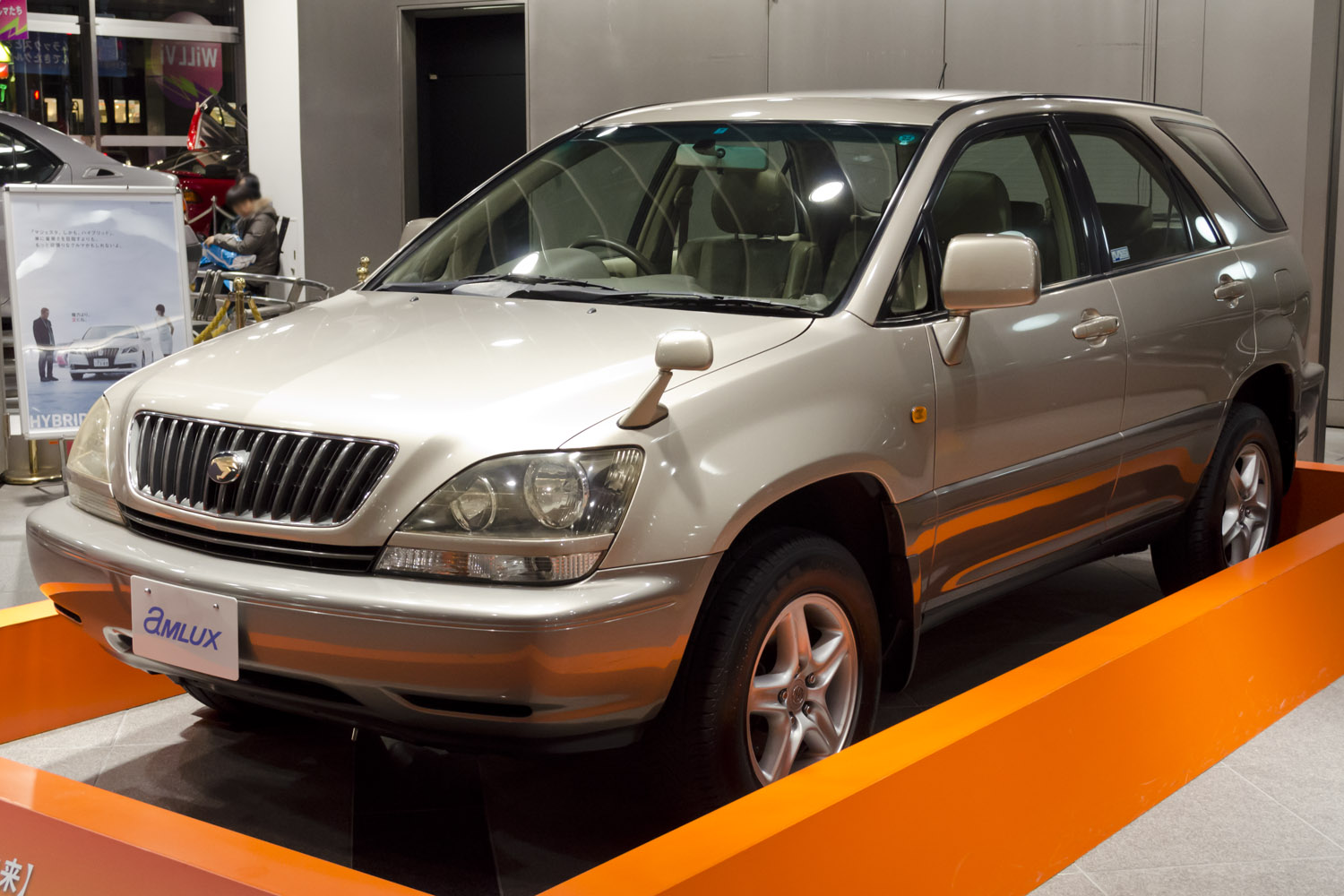

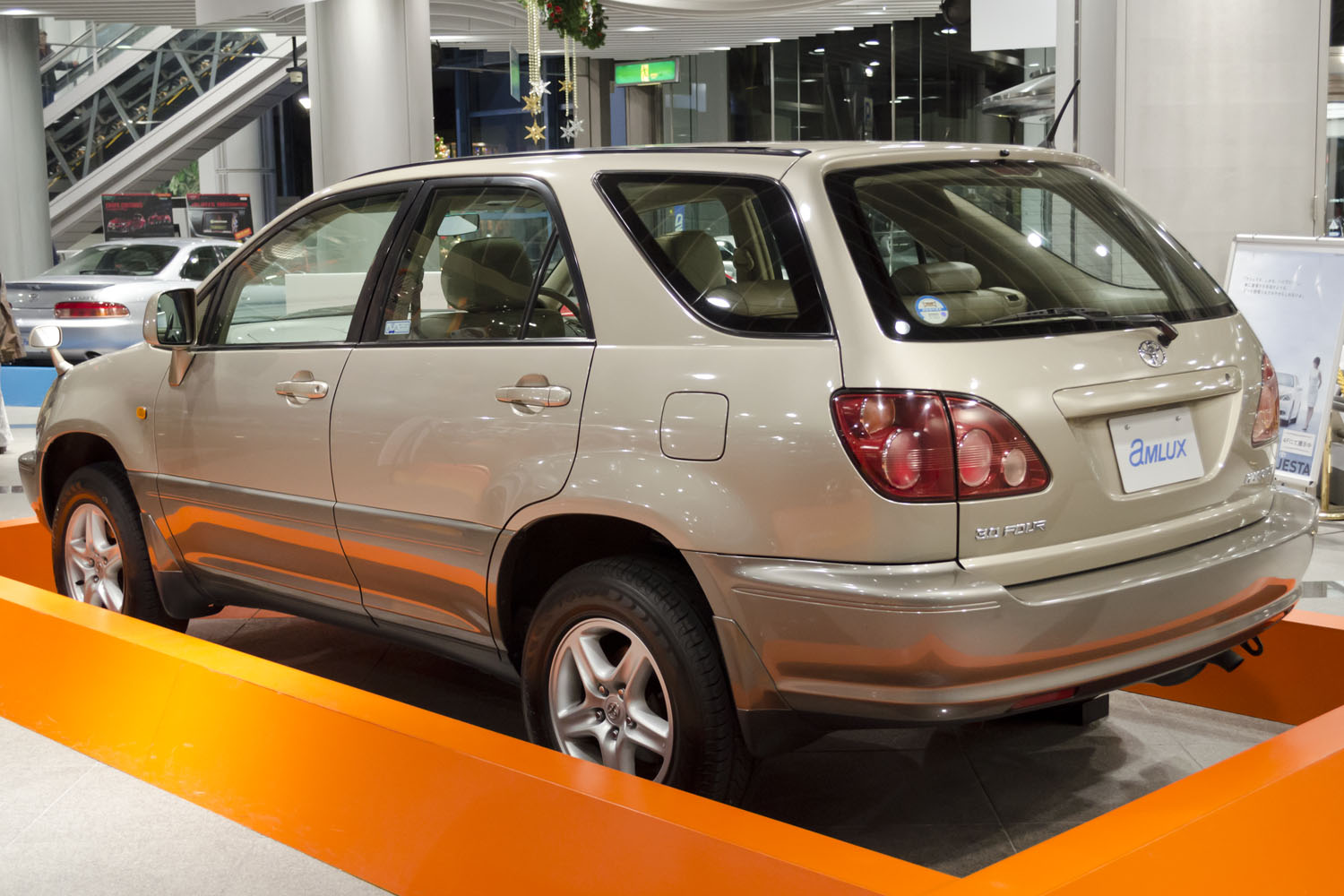
Toyota Harrier (XU10)

Introduced in Japan in December 1997 along with V6 powered versions, the four-cylinder powered Harrier was available in front-wheel drive (SXU10) and all-wheel drive (SXU15) form. The 2.2 L 5S-FE I4 produced 102 kW (137 hp) JIS and 191 N⋅m (141 lb⋅ft) of torque. Both models were fitted with a 4-speed automatic transmission. The Japanese-market Toyota Harrier could be optioned with JBL sound system, sport seats, and a leather steering wheel. The Harrier found success in the Japanese market, and was also shipped as grey imports to right hand drive markets in Asia and Canada.

In June 1998, a special edition "Harrier Zagato" was released. Based on the V6 model, it was equipped with special aluminum wheels and overfenders. This was a collaboration model with the Italian coachbuilder Zagato.

The V6-powered model was available in front-wheel drive (MCU10) and all-wheel drive (MCU15) form, which comprised all RX 300 sales in export markets from March 1998 to 2003, and Harrier V6 sales in Japan from 1997 to 2003.

In November 2000, the 2.2-liter 5S-FE engine in the Harrier was replaced by the 2.4-liter 2AZ-FE four-cylinder engine, producing 117 kW (157 hp) JIS and 221 N⋅m (163 lb⋅ft) of torque. As before, the engine was offered with either front-wheel drive (ACU10) or all-wheel drive (ACU15) versions. A small facelift was also performed on the Harrier. Options included sport-tuned suspension and DVD voice navigation.

== Second generation (XU30; 2003) ==
Second generation
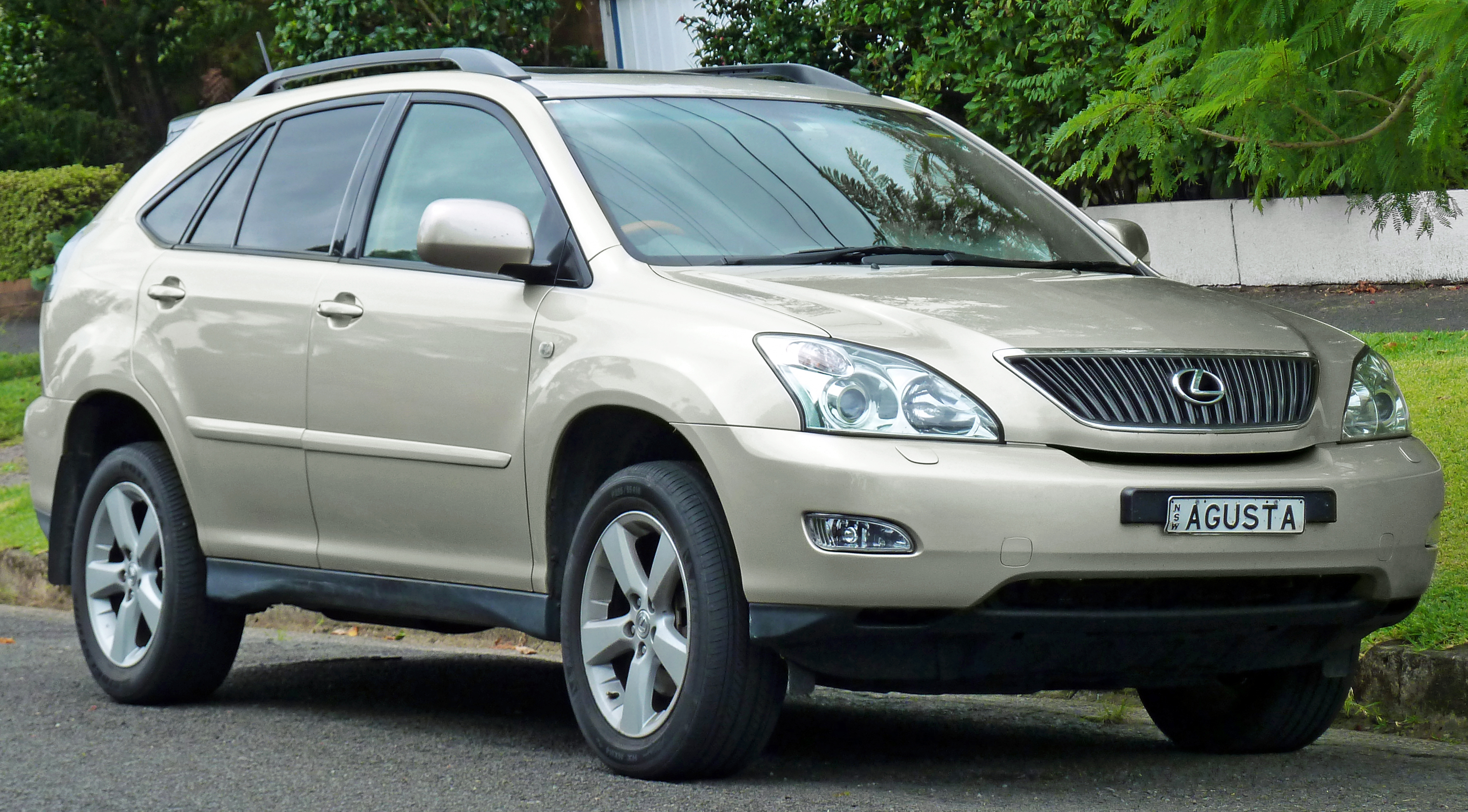
- RX 330 (pre-facelift)

Overview
- Model code: XU30
- Also called: Toyota Harrier (Japan)
- Production: February 2003 – December 2008 (Lexus RX); February 2003 – July 2013 (Toyota Harrier)
- Model years: 2004–2009
- Assembly: Japan: Miyawaka, Fukuoka (TMK); Canada: Cambridge, Ontario (TMMC)
- Designer: Hiroshi Suzuki and Takumi Ichikawa

Body and chassis
- Platform: Toyota K platform
- Related: Lexus ES/Toyota Windom (XV30); Toyota Highlander/Kluger (XU20)

Powertrain
- Engine: Gasoline: 2.4 L 2AZ-FE I4; 3.0 L 1MZ-FE V6; 3.3 L 3MZ-FE V6; 3.5 L 2GR-FE V6; Gasoline hybrid: 3.3 L 3MZ-FE V6
- Transmission: 5-speed U151E/F automatic; CVT (Hybrid)
- Hybrid drivetrain: Power-split (RX400H)

Dimensions
- Wheelbase: 2,715 mm (106.9 in)
- Length: 4,729 mm (186.2 in); 4,755 mm (187.2 in) (hybrid)
- Width: 1,844 mm (72.6 in)
- Height: 2006–07: 1,740 mm (68.5 in); 2008 AWD: 1,687 mm (66.4 in); 2008 FWD: 1,679 mm (66.1 in)

Chronology
- Successor: Toyota Harrier (XU60) (Japan)

=== 2003–2006 ===
In 1999, development began on the XU30 platform under chief engineer Yukihiro Okane. Design work was started under Makoto Oshima and would continue into 2000 when a concept design by Hiroshi Sukuki was approved. By early 2001, the final production design was green-lighted by the executive board, with the first prototypes being tested in 2002. Design patents were filed on 1 April 2002 under No. 794 at the Japanese Patent Office and on 21 April 2003 at the United States Patent and Trademark Office.

The XU30 was previewed in January 2003 at the North American International Auto Show. Featuring a sleeker body style than its predecessor, the XU30 claimed to have a drag coefficient of Cd=0.35 and new LED tailamps. On the inside, the RX 330 interior featured genuine Golden Bird's Eye Maple or Walnut wood trim, a sliding multi-level center storage console, dual-zone climate control, and a power tilt/telescopic steering column. Available options included a 210-watt, 11-speaker Mark Levinson premium sound system, DVD-based navigation system with backup camera, rear seat DVD player with wireless headphones, panoramic three panel moonroof, and heated seats.

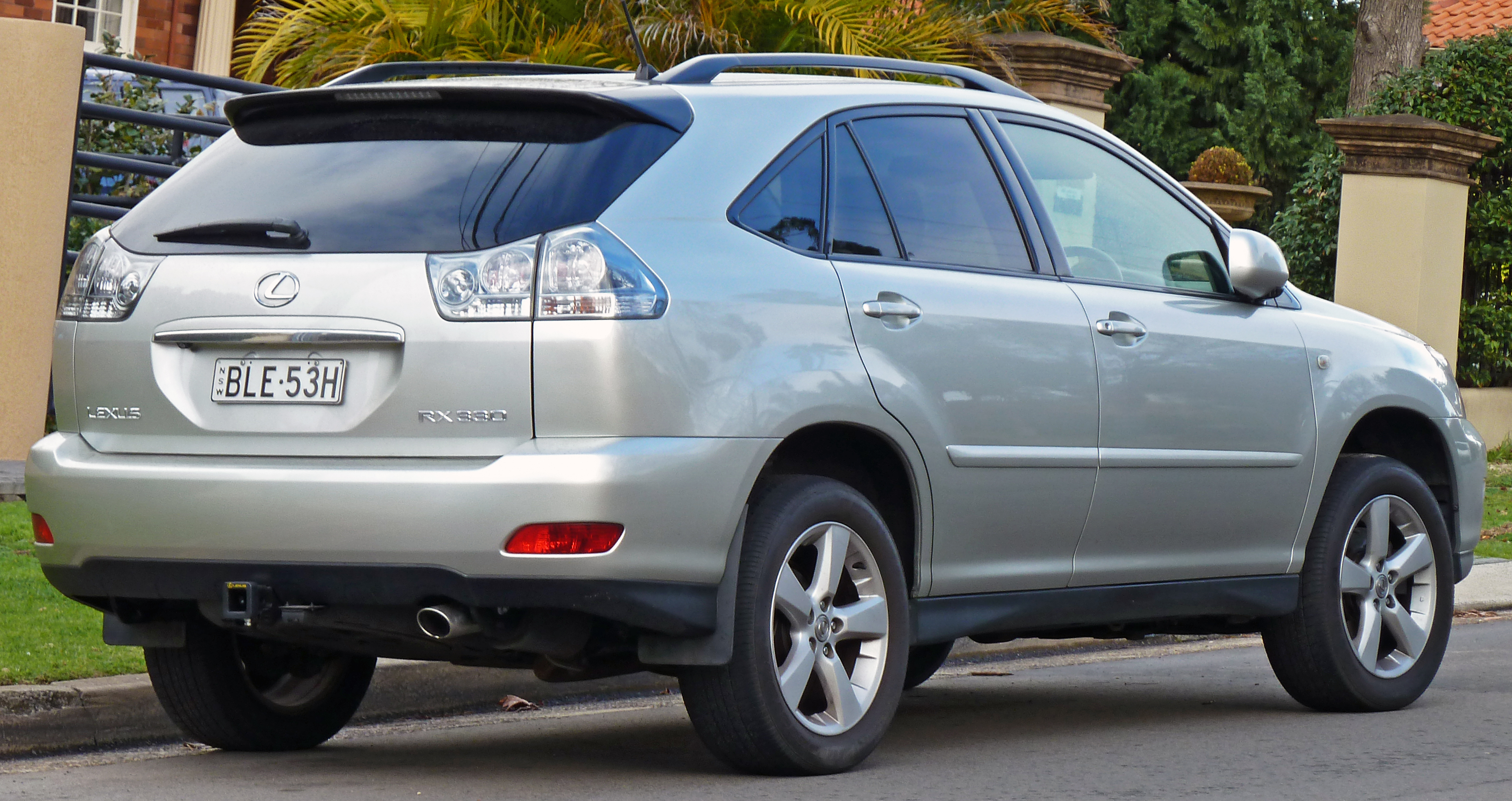
RX 330 (pre-facelift)

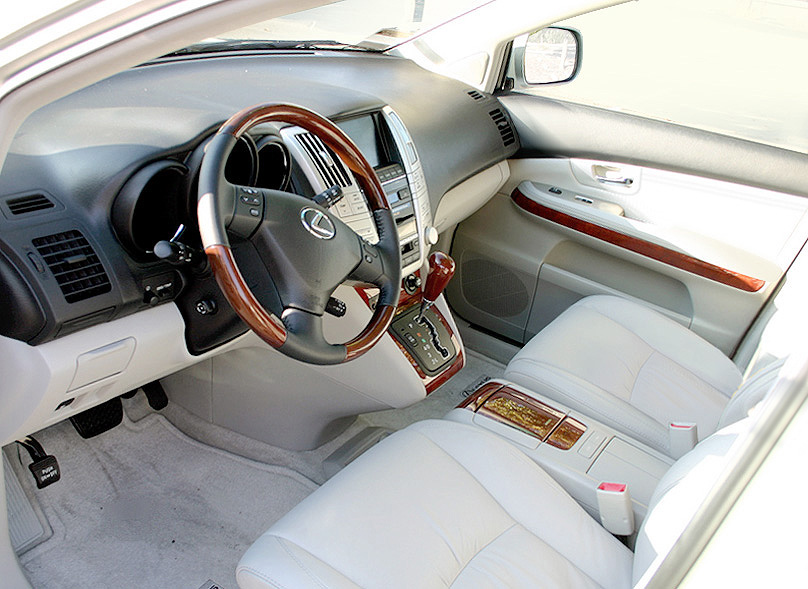
Interior

All RX models came standard with eight airbags, including dual front airbags, front row side torso airbags, side curtain airbags, a driver's knee airbag; Vehicle Stability Control (VDIM on RX 400h) and a tire-pressure monitoring system were standard. An Adaptive Front-lighting System (AFS) with HID headlamps and a backup camera (w/navigation system) were optional. The Lexus RX received a "Good" overall rating in the Insurance Institute for Highway Safety frontal crash test. U.S. National Highway Traffic Safety Administration (NHTSA) crash test results in 2004 rated the RX 330 the maximum five stars in the Frontal Driver, Frontal Passenger, Side Driver, and Side Rear Passenger categories, and four of five stars in the Rollover category.

The new RX launched for European and Asian markets in early 2003, where it was sold as the RX 300 (MCU30/MCU35) and made in Japan. Asian markets included Singapore, where it succeeded the previously sold Harrier, South Korea, and Taiwan. The RX 300 featured a 3.0 L V6, with only the all-wheel drive version available, and air-suspension could be specified.

In North America, the RX 330 series began sales in March 2003 for the 2004 model year. Here, the car was badged RX 330 denoting its larger 3.3-liter V6. The RX 330 (MCU33/MCU38) was powered by a 3.3-liter ULEV certified 3MZ-FE V6, rated at 230 hp (170 kW) SAE and 238 lb⋅ft (323 N⋅m) linked to a 5-speed automatic and was offered in either front or all-wheel drive. New technology features included Adaptive Front-lighting System (AFS) with swivel headlights, height-adjustable air suspension on the all-wheel drive models, Dynamic Laser Cruise Control system, and rain-sensing wipers. All North American models were initially built in Japan until September 2003 when production of the RX 330 began in Cambridge, Ontario, Canada. For each year of the second and third generation RX, a small number of non-hybrid RXs were assembled in Japan.

Lexus debuted the RX 400h (MHU38) at the 2004 North American International Auto Show, with plans to launch the vehicle in the U.S. market. The equivalent Harrier Hybrid debuted in Japan on 22 March 2005, the same day as the Toyota Highlander Hybrid. Hybrid production began in March 2005 at Toyota Motor Kyushu. The Lexus RX 400h made its U.S. sales debut in mid-2005, with over 9,000 pre-orders at launch. The RX 400h's arrival in the U.S. had been delayed by several months; Lexus had announced in November 2004 that the American launch of the hybrid Lexus SUV would occur for the 2006 model year. The RX 400h became the first production premium hybrid vehicle when it went on sale in 2005.

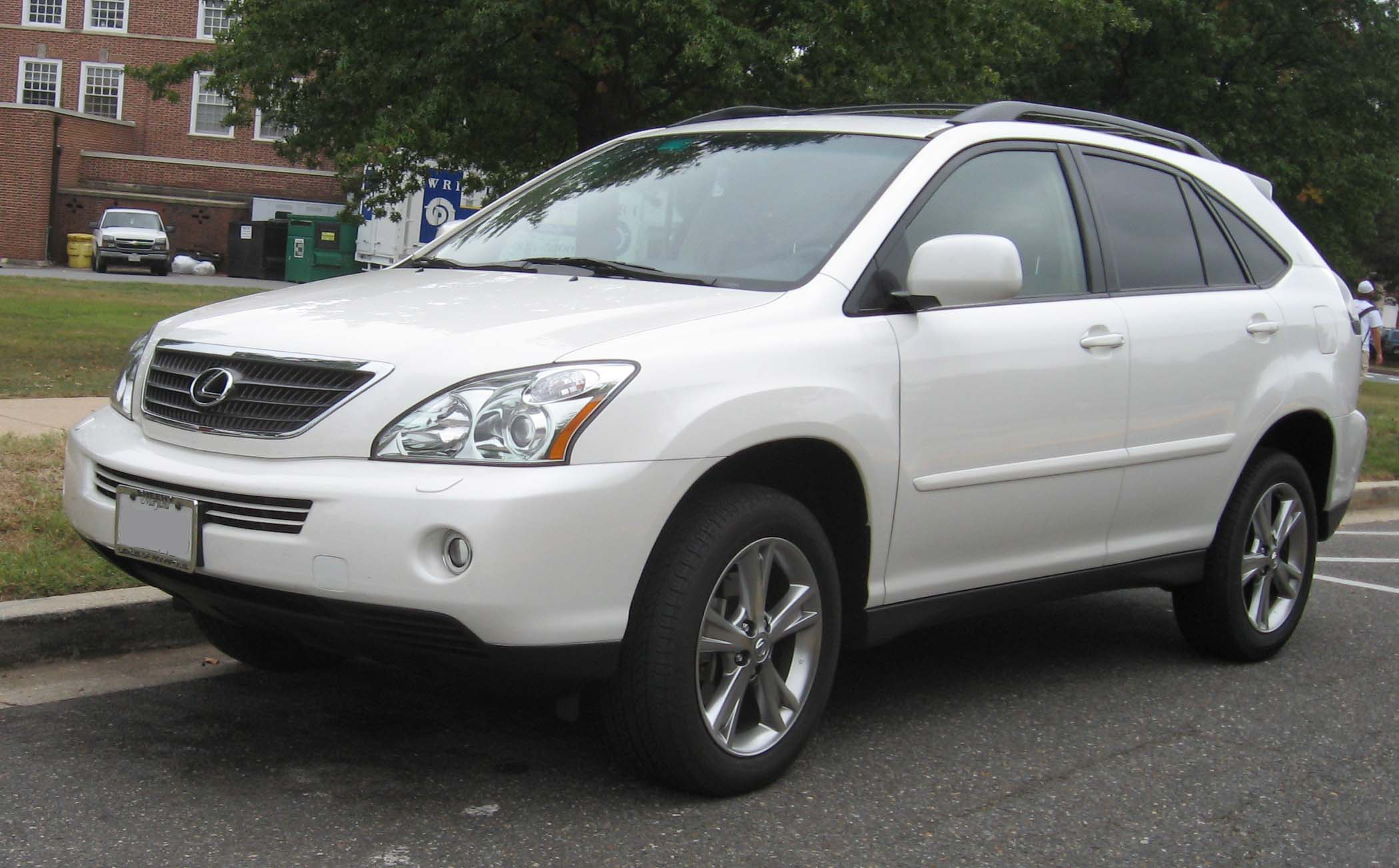

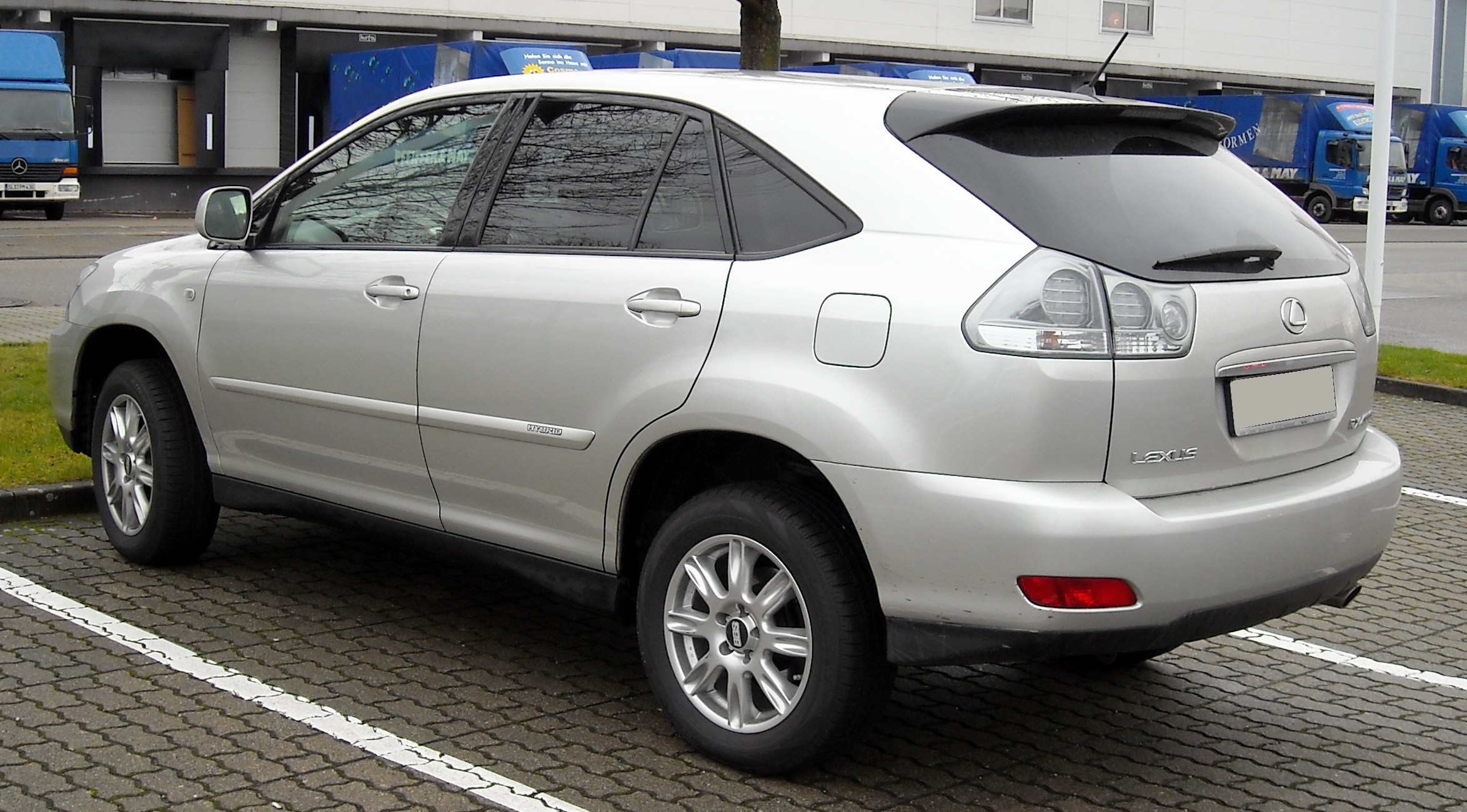
Lexus RX 400h

Compared to the Lexus RX 330 and RX 350, the RX 400h featured a different front grille and round fog lights, and also differently styled LED tail lights in place of the conventional LED ones on the RX 330/RX 350. Different exterior colors were offered. In 2007, Hybrid badging was added to the rear side doors. The RX 400h interior featured a hybrid information display on the navigation screen showing electrical motor, gasoline engine, and regenerative braking activation in real time. Some RX 400h models without navigation screens displayed the information on a small monochrome display on the instrument panel. When launched in 2005, the RX 400h came exclusively with brushed aluminum interior accents, in place of the wood trim offered in the standard RX. This changed in 2006, when the RX 400h became available with Bird's Eye Maple wood trim.

Since its launch, the all-wheel drive RX 400h/Harrier Hybrid was sold at a substantial premium over the non-hybrid RX 300/RX 330/RX 350/Harrier. In the U.S., the initial base price was US$49,185, which was a US$5,600 premium over a similarly equipped RX 330/RX 350. A front-wheel drive version of the RX 400h debuted in 2006, with a base MSRP approximately US$1,400 less than the all-wheel drive RX hybrid. For 2007, along with the reduction of the federal hybrid tax credit for its hybrids, Lexus lowered the base price of the RX 400h to US$42,580 and US$41,180 for the respective all-wheel and front-wheel drive versions. The list price in Japan for the Harrier Hybrid ranged from ¥4.095 million to ¥4.62 million. Based on the 2010 Lexus RX redesign, there was no RX 400h for the 2009 model year. However, the RX 400h did receive a facelift for the 2008 model year, featuring a blue Lexus badge and a rear spoiler that matches the body color.

The gasoline-powered part of the RX 400h engine system was a 3.3-liter 3MZ-FE V6, very similar to the one found in the RX 330. It produced 211 PS (155 kW; 208 hp) and 288 N⋅m (212 lbf⋅ft). The gasoline engine was aided by a maximum of two additional electric motors, one driving the front wheels, producing 167 PS (123 kW; 165 hp) and 333 N⋅m (246 lbf⋅ft) and connected to the CVT gearbox, and the other driving the rear wheels, producing 68 PS (50 kW; 67 hp) and 130 N⋅m (96 lbf⋅ft). The whole system, called Lexus Hybrid Drive (also Hybrid Synergy Drive), produced a maximum of 272 PS (200 kW; 268 hp). With Lexus Hybrid Drive, under normal driving conditions, only the front motor and gasoline engine were used. The rear motor was only used under full-throttle acceleration or when the front wheels lost traction. A Ni-MH battery was responsible for powering the motors, and charged by generators during deceleration or sharp cornering. Standard features included an Electronically Controlled Brake and Vehicle Dynamics Integrated Management stability control system.

The RX 400h gasoline engine switched off automatically and the car ran completely on electricity when either stationary, decelerating, or being driven at slow speeds—less than 60 km/h (40 mph). Not only did the hybrid drive in the RX 400h improve fuel economy, but with the assistance of the electric motor, the RX 400h could reach 0–97 km/h (0–60 mph) in 7.3 seconds, quicker than the gasoline-only RX. Despite the increased performance, the RX 400h/Harrier Hybrid consumed roughly the same amount of gasoline as a compact four-cylinder sedan and it qualified as a Super Ultra Low Emission Vehicle (SULEV) in the US. Passing power at lower and mid engine rpm's was noticeably improved due to the electric motor. The water pump for the gasoline engine is driven by the camshaft belt. To improve efficiency, and because the gasoline engine shuts down during electric-only operation, the alternator, power steering pump, and air conditioner compressor are beltless; rather than being tied to engine output, these components are powered by electric motors via the battery instead.

The RX 400h served as the launch vehicle of the Lexus hybrid lineup, which later expanded to include hybrid versions of other Lexus vehicles, including the GS 450h and LS 600h/LS 600h L, and in 2009, the first ever designated-hybrid (no gasoline model available) Lexus, the HS 250h.

In January 2005, Lexus introduced the RX 330 "Thundercloud Edition" for the U.S. market, featuring a chrome horizontal-slatted grille, unique 5-spoke 18" alloy wheels, black Bird's Eye Maple wood trim, Thundercloud badges and carpeted floor mats, and two special exterior colors (Thundercloud Metallic and Thundercloud Flint Mica). Production was limited to 6,500 units.

=== 2006–2008 ===
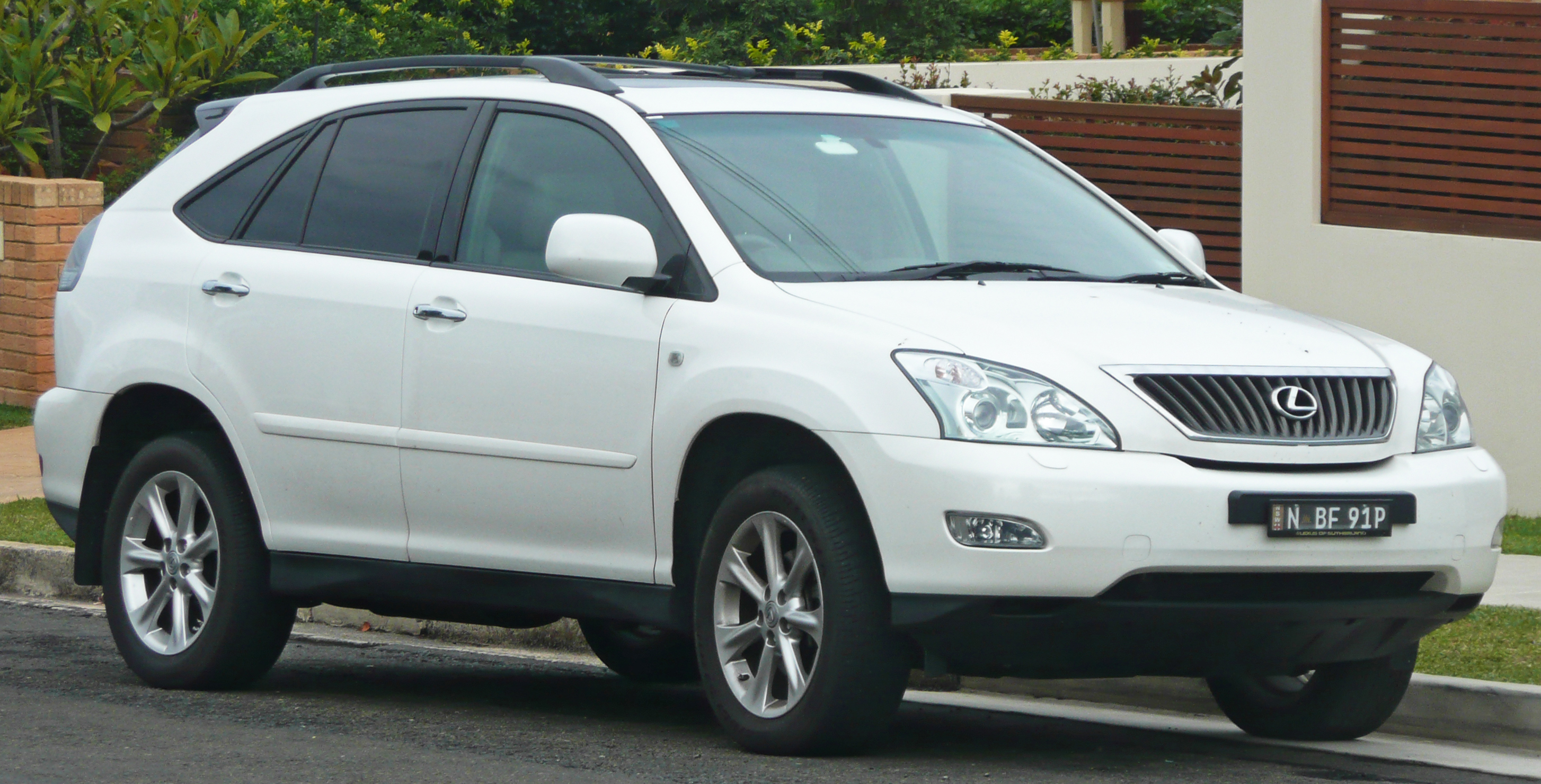

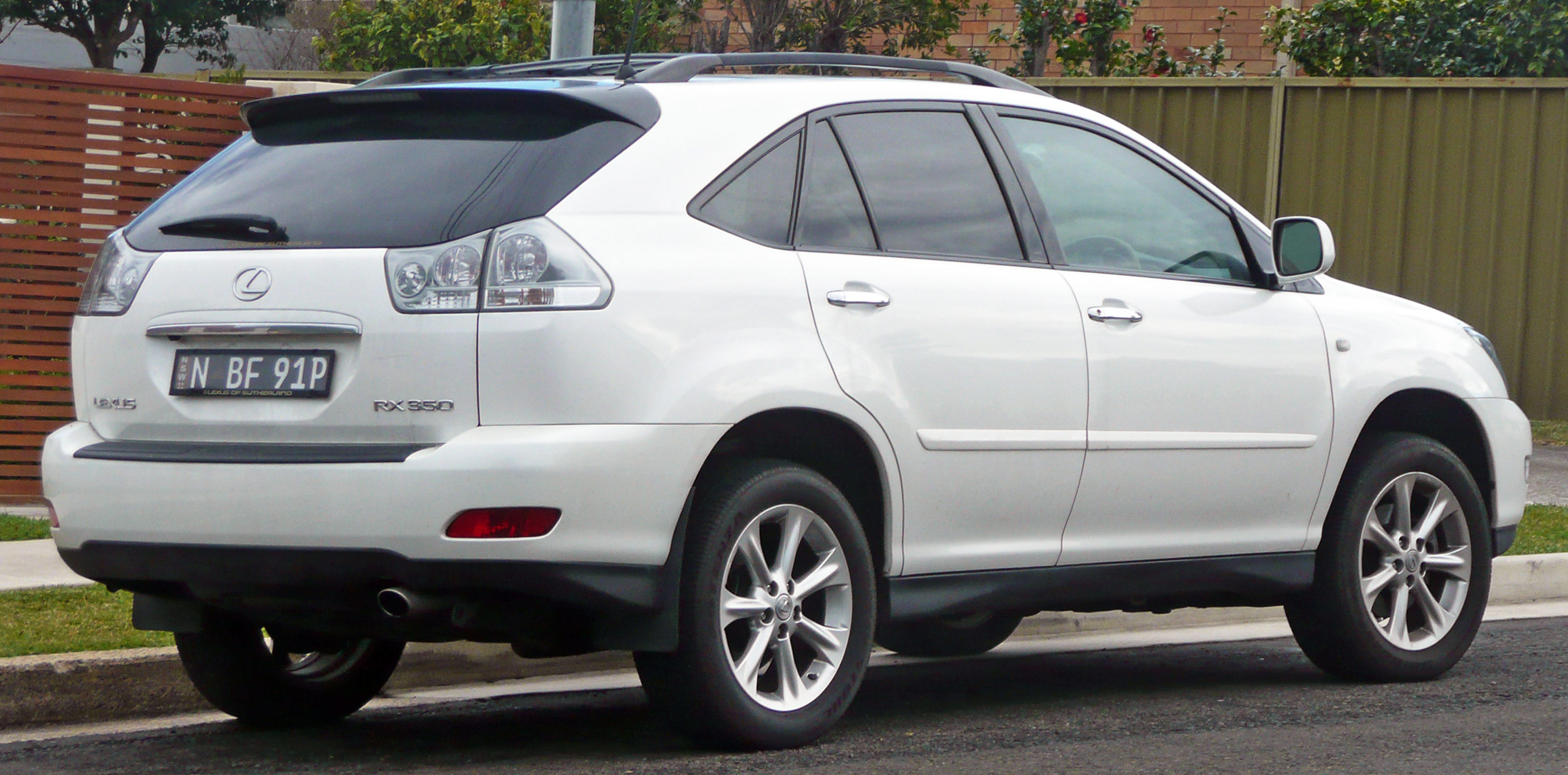
Facelift Lexus RX 350

In 2006 for the 2007 model year, the RX received a mid-cycle refresh consisting of a new 3.5-liter 2GR-FE V6 replacing the 3.3-liter 3MZ-FE V6 engine on non-hybrid models, updating the vehicle's name from RX 330 to RX 350, with new model codes GSU30 and GSU35. The RX 350 also featured an updated, Lexus Generation V DVD navigation system with improved graphics, voice controlled destination inputs, and a new feature called "bread crumbs." Bread crumbs will enable drivers to retrace their steps. The new navigation system also featured voice dial systems and the ability to enter destinations by voice address while driving.

In 2007 for the 2008 model year, the RX received a revised grille, chrome door handles, available new seven-spoke 18-inch alloy wheels with a liquid graphite finish, and Brandy Wine Mica or Desert Sage Metallic were new exterior choices. Black Bird's Eye Maple wood with grey interior was a new interior option for that year.

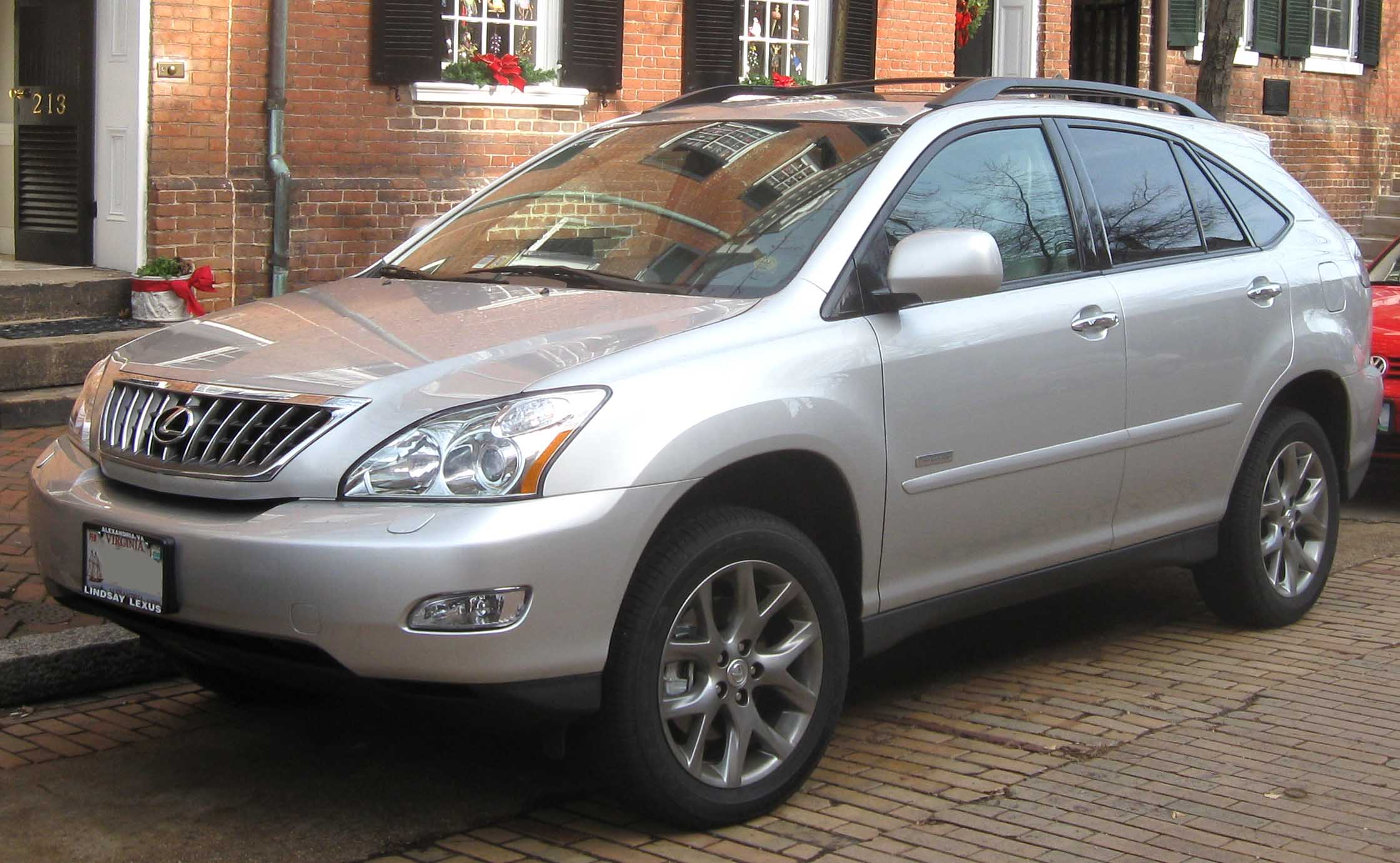
Lexus RX 350 Pebble Beach Edition

In February 2008 for the 2009 model year, Lexus added a new Pebble Beach Edition, limited to 6,000 units, with a base MSRP of US$41,580 – US$42,980. These limited production models have "Pebble Beach" badges on front fenders and embroidered front floor mats, were available in Black Onyx and Truffle Mica color, and came equipped with limited-edition 18-inch alloy wheels, a color-keyed rear spoiler, and a chrome-finished grille. Buyers also received a choice of custom amenities designed to complement the Pebble Beach lifestyle. RX 350, RX 400h, and Harrier 350G's Production ended in December 2008.

The RX 330 was named most appealing luxury SUV by J.D. Power and Associates in 2004. It was also the Best Overall Value in the SUV market over US$30,000 in 2003, 2004, and 2005 according to Intellichoice. The Lexus RX 400h was one of only four SUVs to achieve recognition on J.D. Power and Associates' 2006 Automotive Environmental Index of the top 30 most environmentally friendly vehicles. J.D. Power also awarded the RX 400h the top spot for entry-luxury SUVs in its 2005 Automotive Performance, Execution and Layout Study on owners' attitudes towards new vehicle designs. At the 2005 GreenFleet Awards in the United Kingdom, recognizing environmentally friendly transportation, Lexus was recognized for introducing the RX 400h with the 4x4 Manufacturer of the Year title. The RX 400h was named SUV of Texas at the 2005 Texas Truck Rodeo awards, and was awarded recognition as a CNET editor's choice vehicle in 2005.

=== Toyota Harrier ===
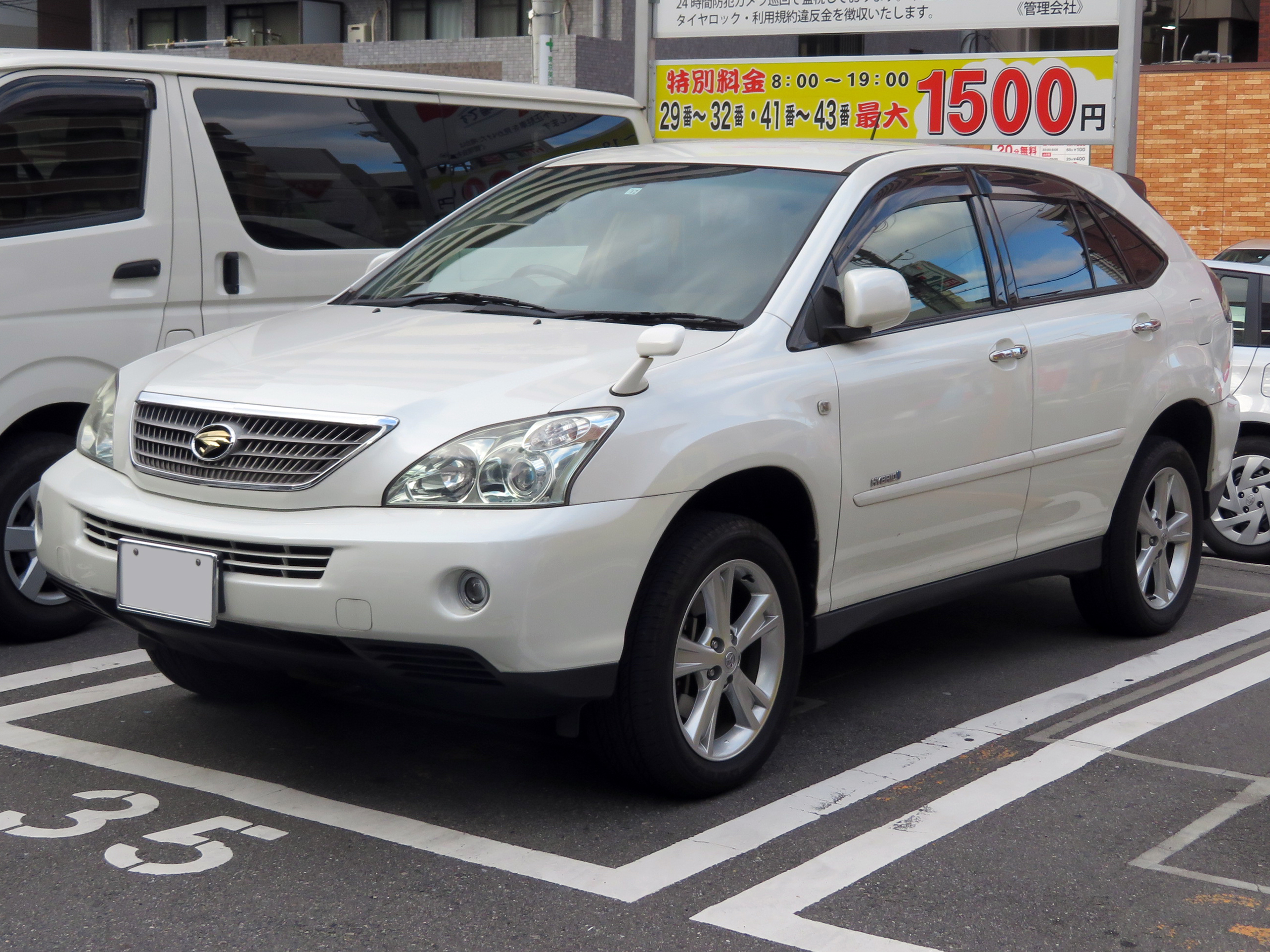
Front

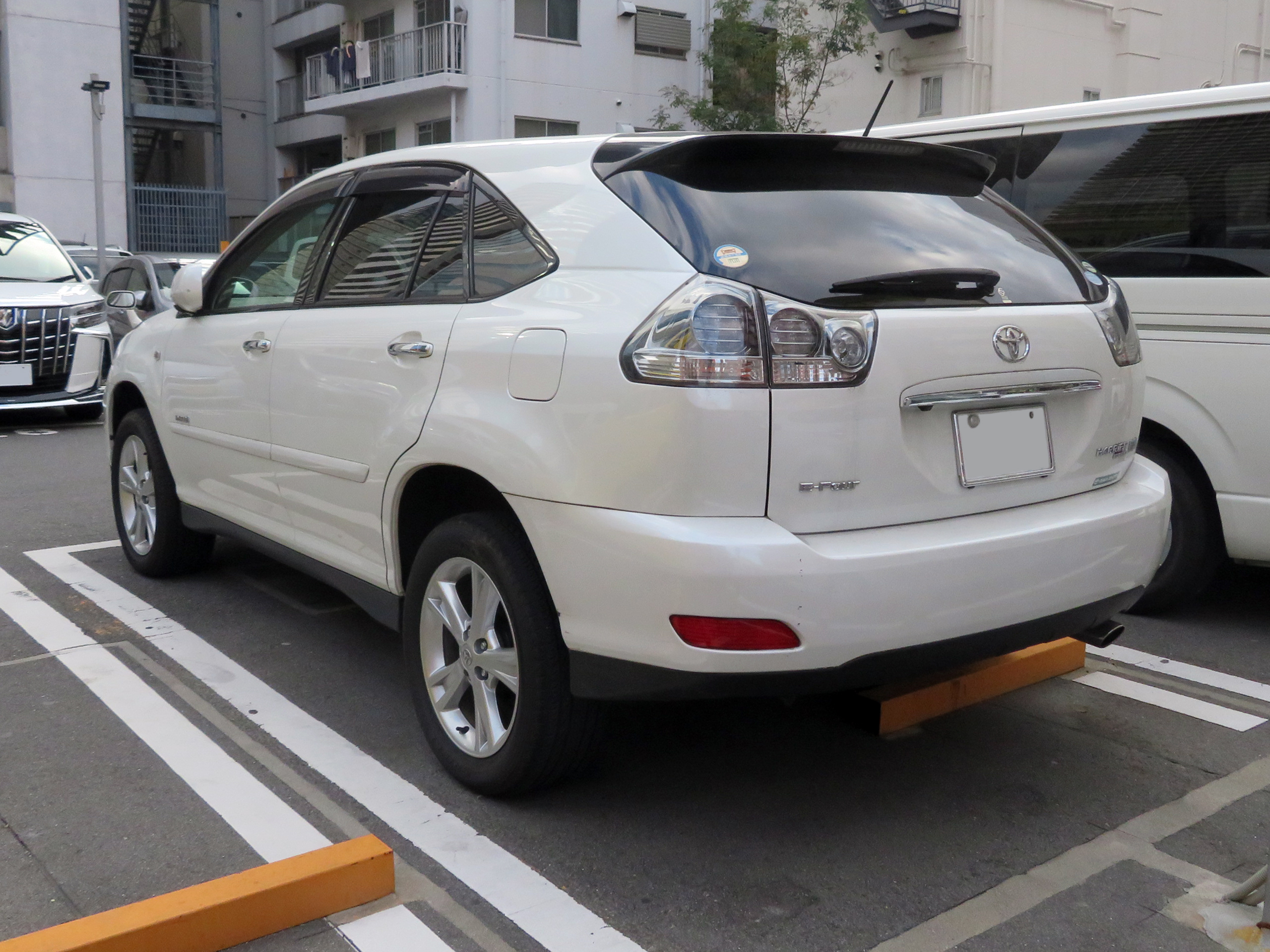
Rear

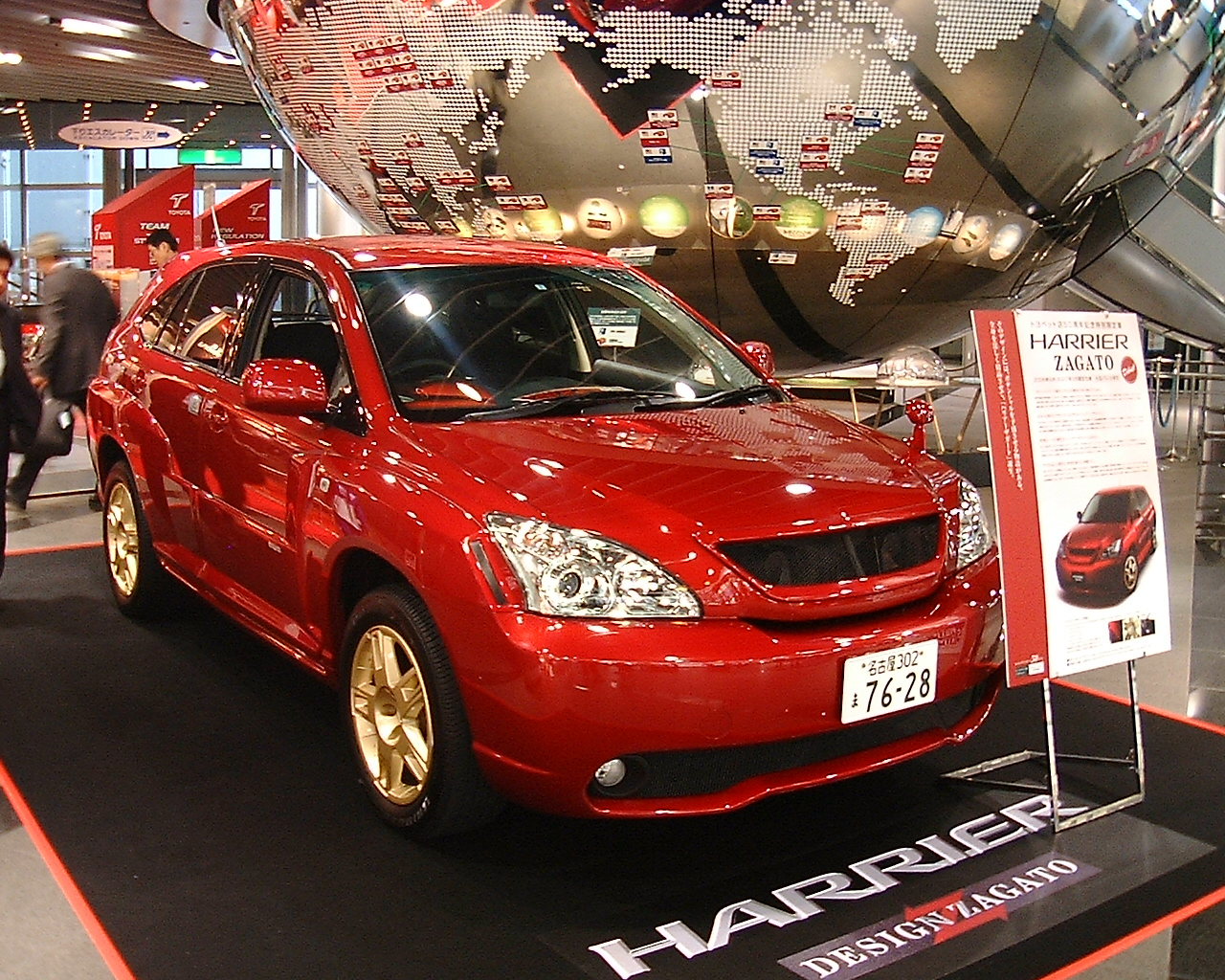
Harrier Zagato

The Harrier (codename ACU30 and MCU30 for the front-wheel drive models, and ACU35 and MCU35 for the all-wheel drive models) was released on 17 February 2003. The engine was a 3,000 cc V6 or a 2,400 cc inline 4-cylinder. The transmission was a 5-speed automatic or a 4-speed automatic. The drivetrain was the same as the first generation, with two options: 4WD and FWD. In Japan, the Toyota Harrier was the first worldwide production car with optional radar-assisted Pre-Collision System (PCS) (Forward collision warning only, no autonomous braking). The front and side view monitoring and cornering assist monitor with threat monitor.

It was offered in: 240G, 300G, and AIRS. Both variants are also offered in the L Package and Premium Package. The Harrier is sold exclusively at the Toyopet Store. It was only equipped with the 2AZ-FE I4 and 1MZ-FE V6 engine. The "AIRS" air-suspension was available on the 3.0 L V6 models.

On 28 July 2006, a special edition "Harrier Zagato" was released to commemorate the 50th anniversary of the Toyopet Store, with a limited run of 250 units. Like its predecessor, it was a collaboration model with Zagato, and the improvements were almost identical to those of the previous model. Red Mica Metallic was an exclusive color (also available in White Pearl Crystal Shine and Black). This time, in addition to the V6, an inline-4 was also available.

While the Lexus RX ended production in 2008, the Harrier remained in production until July 2013 and was replaced by the Toyota Harrier (XU60) in November 2013.

=== Safety ===
ANCAP test results* Lexus RX330 (2003)
Test	Score
Overall	4 /5 stars
Frontal offset	13.64/16
Side impact	16/16
Pole	0/2
Seat belt reminders	0/3
Whiplash protection	Not Assessed
Pedestrian protection	Poor
Electronic stability control	Standard

== Third generation (AL10; 2008) ==
Third generation
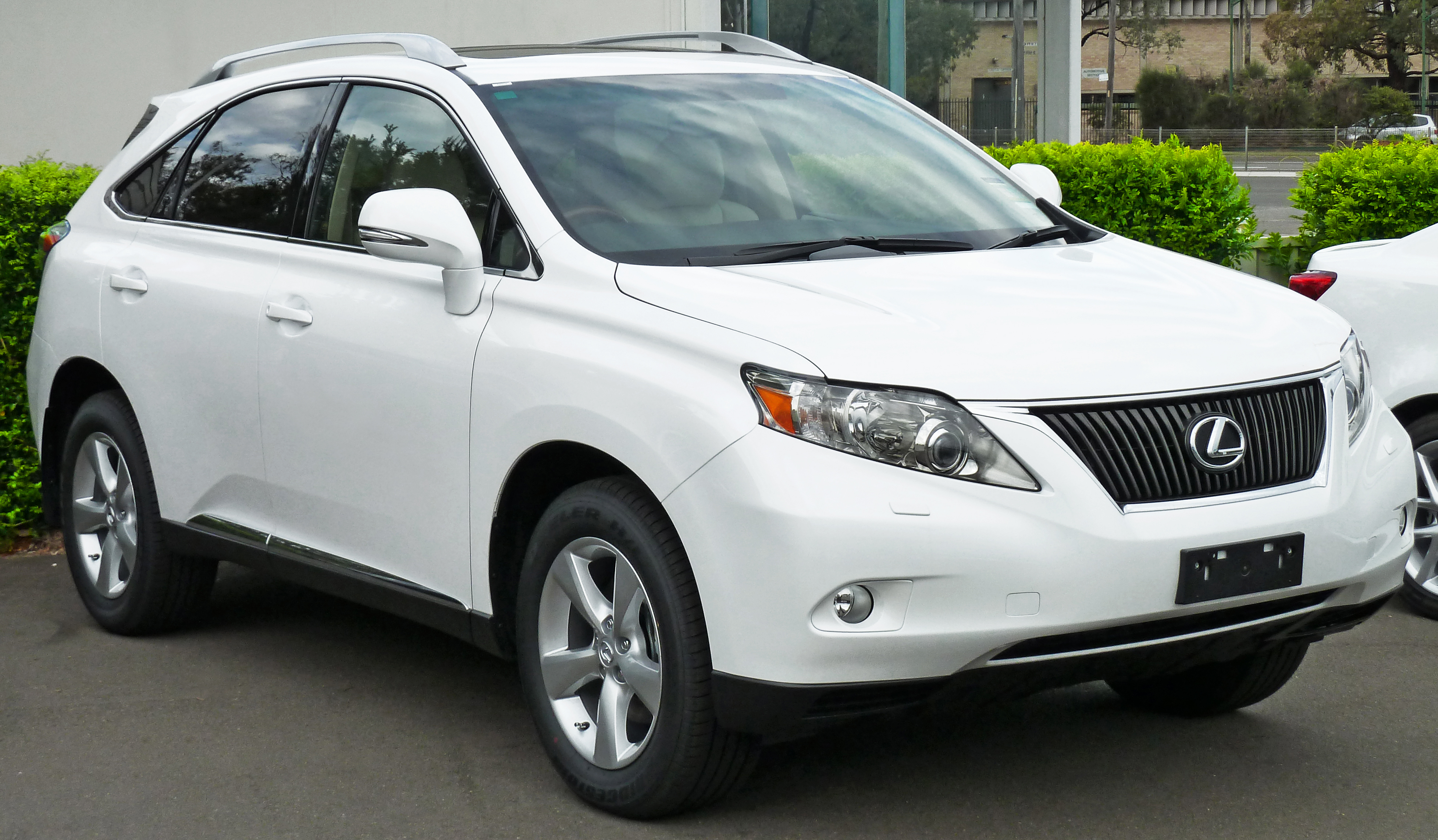
- RX 350 (pre-facelift)

Overview
- Model code: AL10
- Production: November 2008 – September 2015
- Model years: 2010–2015
- Assembly: Japan: Miyawaka, Fukuoka (TMK); Canada: Cambridge, Ontario (TMMC)
- Designer: Masanari Sakae, Hiroyuki Tada, Shinno Kato and Tokiko Gamou

Body and chassis
- Platform: Toyota K platform
- Related: Lexus ES (XV40); Toyota Highlander/Kluger (XU40); Toyota Venza (AV10)

Powertrain
- Engine: Gasoline: 2.7 L 1AR-FE I4 (2010–2015); 3.5 L 2GR-FE V6; Gasoline hybrid: 3.5 L 2GR-FXE V6
- Transmission: 6-speed automatic U660E/F; CVT; 8-speed automatic (F Sport, N.America)
- Hybrid drivetrain: Power-split (450h)

Dimensions
- Wheelbase: 2,741 mm (107.9 in)
- Length: 4,770 mm (187.8 in)
- Width: 1,885 mm (74.2 in)
- Height: AWD: 1,684 mm (66.3 in); FWD: 1,720 mm (67.7 in)

=== 2008–2012 ===
Development of the third-generation RX began in 2004. Chief engineer Takayuki Katsuda headed development, with design being conducted from 2005. In late 2006, design work by Masanari Sakae was chosen, with the final designs that were presented as 1:1 scale models being green-lighted for production in the first half of 2007. On 9 October 2007, design patents were filed at the Japanese Patent Office (7 April 2008 in the U.S.) for both a conceptual variant and two production variants (RX and RX 450h). The first North American pre-production prototypes were sent to Cambridge, Canada in early 2008 for testing prior to the first RX 350 rolling off the production line on 28 November 2008. A hybrid concept vehicle, the LF-Xh, previewed the third-generation RX's design direction at international auto shows a year prior to the production model's debut. The LF-Xh, which stands for Lexus Future-Crossover(X) hybrid, was first shown at the 2007 Tokyo Motor Show. The LF-Xh featured a V6 engine with electric motors, LED headlights and taillights, and a concept interior.

Lexus debuted the third-generation RX on 19 November 2008. The AL10 series is built in Japan and Canada, with North American models primarily built in Cambridge, Ontario, Canada.

Japanese RX sales began on 19 January 2009 initially only offered in sole variant: RX350. RX450h sales began in April 2009. A front-wheel drive variant of the RX450h was added in September 2009. Each trim level is equipped with the "Version L" (Luxury) which is luxury-oriented, while the "Version S" (Sport) is a sportier version of the RX. A lower variant was released in August 2010, the RX270 was added. The RX 270 features a revised 2.7-litre 1AR-FE I4 which produces maximum power 188 hp (140 kW).

American RX 350 sales began in February 2009 as a 2010 model. For 2009, the front-wheel drive RX 350 starts at US$36,800 while the all-wheel drive version starts at US$38,200. EPA-estimated fuel economy is improved at city/highway/combined 18/25/21 mpg for the FWD RX 350 and 18/24/20 mpg for the AWD model. The RX 350 (GGL10/GGL15) features a revised 3.5-liter 2GR-FE V6 engine producing 275 hp (205 kW) with a wider power curve, it remains ULEV-II certified and now uses a six-speed automatic transmission with sequential shift.

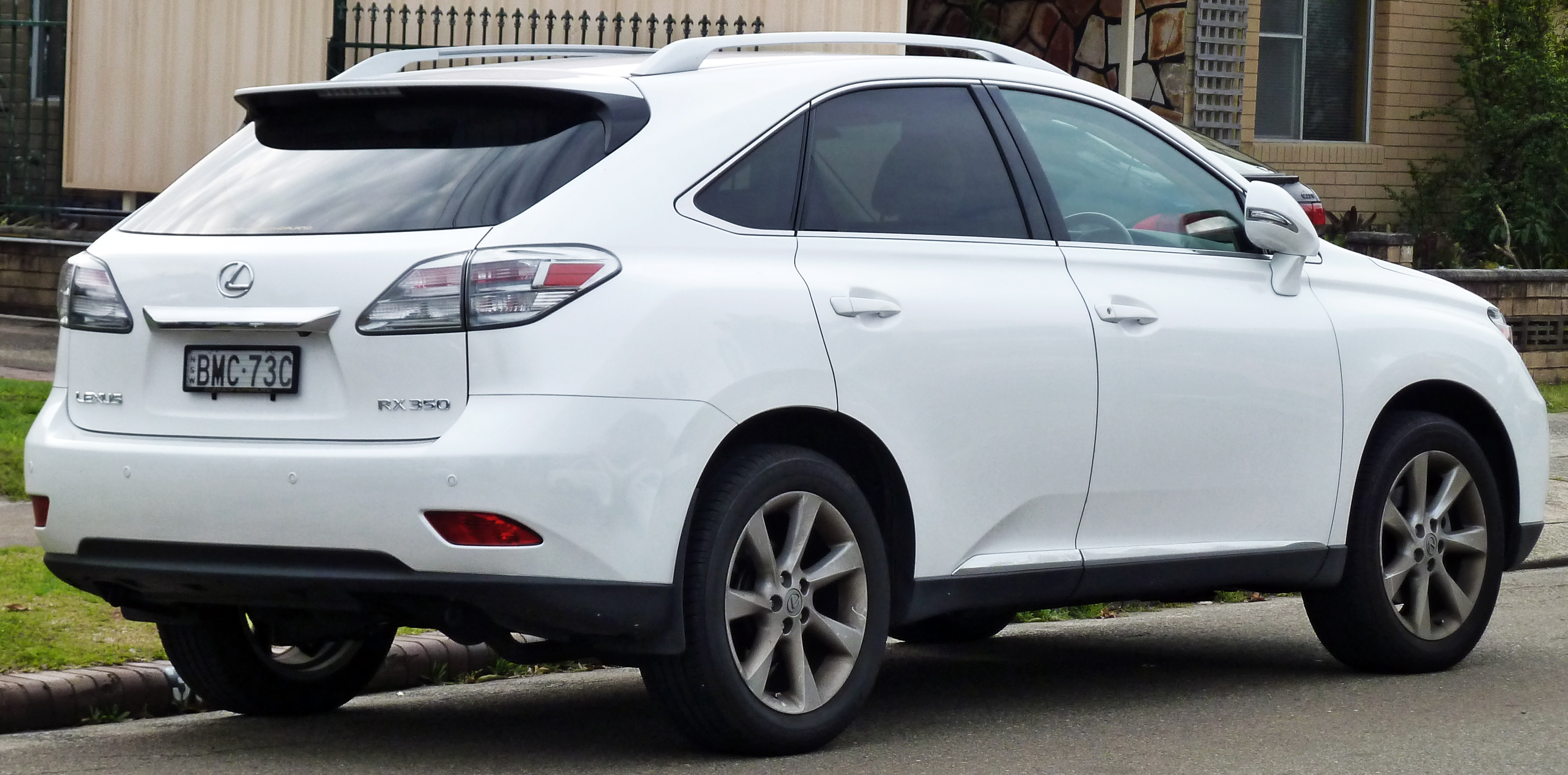
Pre-facelift Lexus RX 350

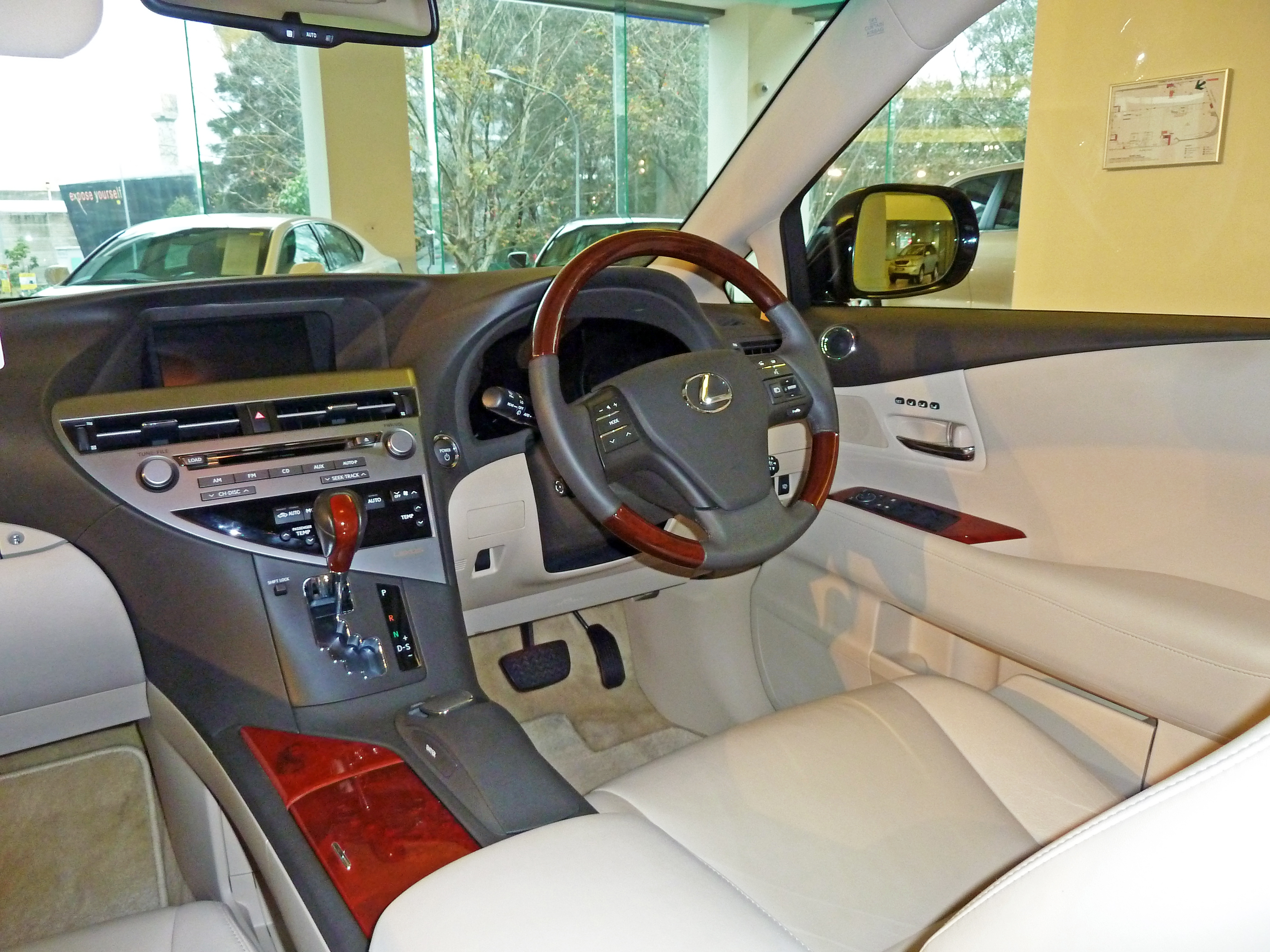
Interior

The third-generation RX's new transmission can lock-up its torque converter from 2nd through 6th gears to improve fuel economy. By dropping the center locking differential, a new Active Torque Control all-wheel drive system diverts anywhere from 50% or up to 100% power to the front wheels for reduced drivetrain associated efficiency losses which in turn increases fuel efficiency. An Electric Power Steering (EPS) system replaces the previous belt-driven hydraulic pump. A double wishbone rear suspension setup replaces the previous MacPherson strut design for improved handling and greater cargo space, while an optional Sports Package adds a performance-tuned suspension.

The AL10 RX's new exterior styling adopts the L-finesse design language, and outer features include a rear spoiler which hides the rear window wiper and radio antenna creating a less cluttered appearance. The drag coefficient on the latest RX 350 has been reduced to Cd=0.33. Exterior dimensions are increased, with cargo room increased by five percent over the prior generation. For the interior, major standard features include SmartAccess, a keyless entry and start system, electrochromic heated side mirrors, UV reducing exterior glass, Bluetooth, power tilt/telescoping steering wheel, power 10-way driver and passenger seats, sliding and reclining rear seats and a power rear hatch. The instrument cluster's multi-function display uses an organic light-emitting diode (OLED) display instead of a thin film transistor (TFT-LCD) display. New cabin technologies include VoiceBox Technologies conversational speech voice recognition system, the first of its kind in the U.S., which can recognize general speech commands. The new hard disk drive HDD-based navigation system no longer uses a touchscreen, instead replacing it with Lexus' Remote Touch controller, similar in function to a computer mouse, with haptic feedback. Optional accessory features include XM Satellite Radio, a 15-speaker 330-watt Mark Levinson Surround Sound audio system, a dual-screen Rear Seat Entertainment System (RSES), 19-inch wheels, heated and ventilated front seats, power front seat cushion extender, perforated and semi-aniline leather seats, a smog sensor for the HVAC system, power folding side view mirrors, and navigation system. With XM subscription the navigation adds real-time NavTraffic and NavWeather updates.

The third-generation RX comes standard with a twin-chamber front passenger airbags, side torso airbags for the front row, side curtain airbags for front and rear rows, and knee airbags for the front row. Active headrests become standard to help reduce whiplash injuries. Vehicle Stability Control (VSC) and Hill Assist Control (HAC) which helps prevent the vehicle from rolling backwards on inclines are standard while a more advanced Vehicle Dynamics Integrated Management (VDIM) system is optional. VDIM is designed to be more subtle and less intrusive in performance than VSC alone, VDIM can also engage prior to an actual skid taking place acting as a preventative measure. The Adaptive Front-lighting System (AFS) remains optional, while a new bi-xenon optional Intelligent Highbeam feature is added, this system can dim the high-beams automatically whenever traffic is detected. Other optional safety features include a Pre-Collision System (PCS) and a Head-up Display (HUD) which helps the driver keep attention on the road ahead by displaying navigation, speed, and audio information on the windshield; the HUD uses high-intensity LEDs displaying high contrast white figures on the windshield allowing it to be read in direct sunlight. The optional navigation system offers a backup camera and a Wide-View Side Monitor utilizes a camera on the passenger side view mirror to help eliminate blind spots on the passenger side at low speeds, this system does not include the 180° wide-angle front camera found in the LX 570. To further help improve visibility, water-repellent glass is used on the front doors.

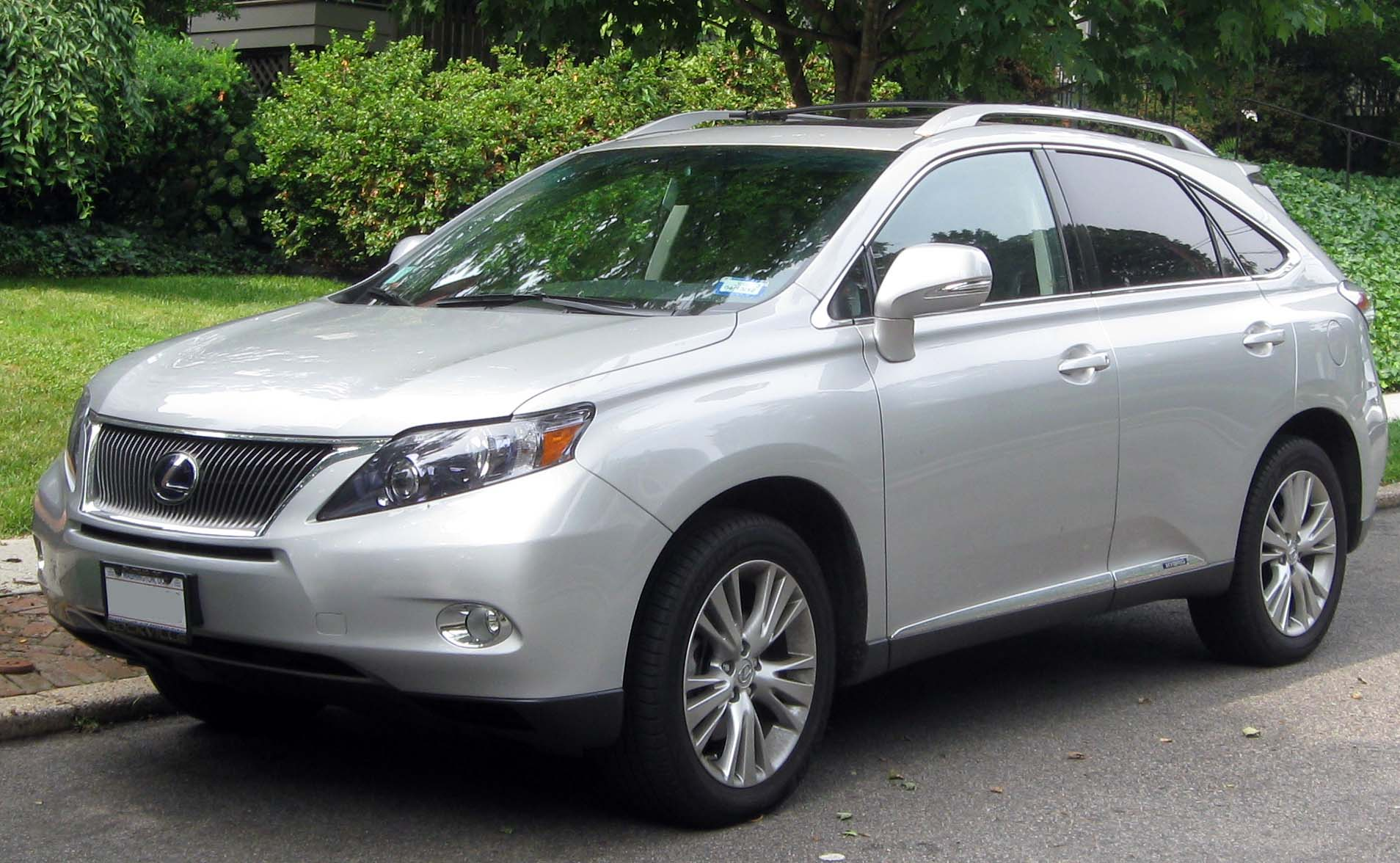

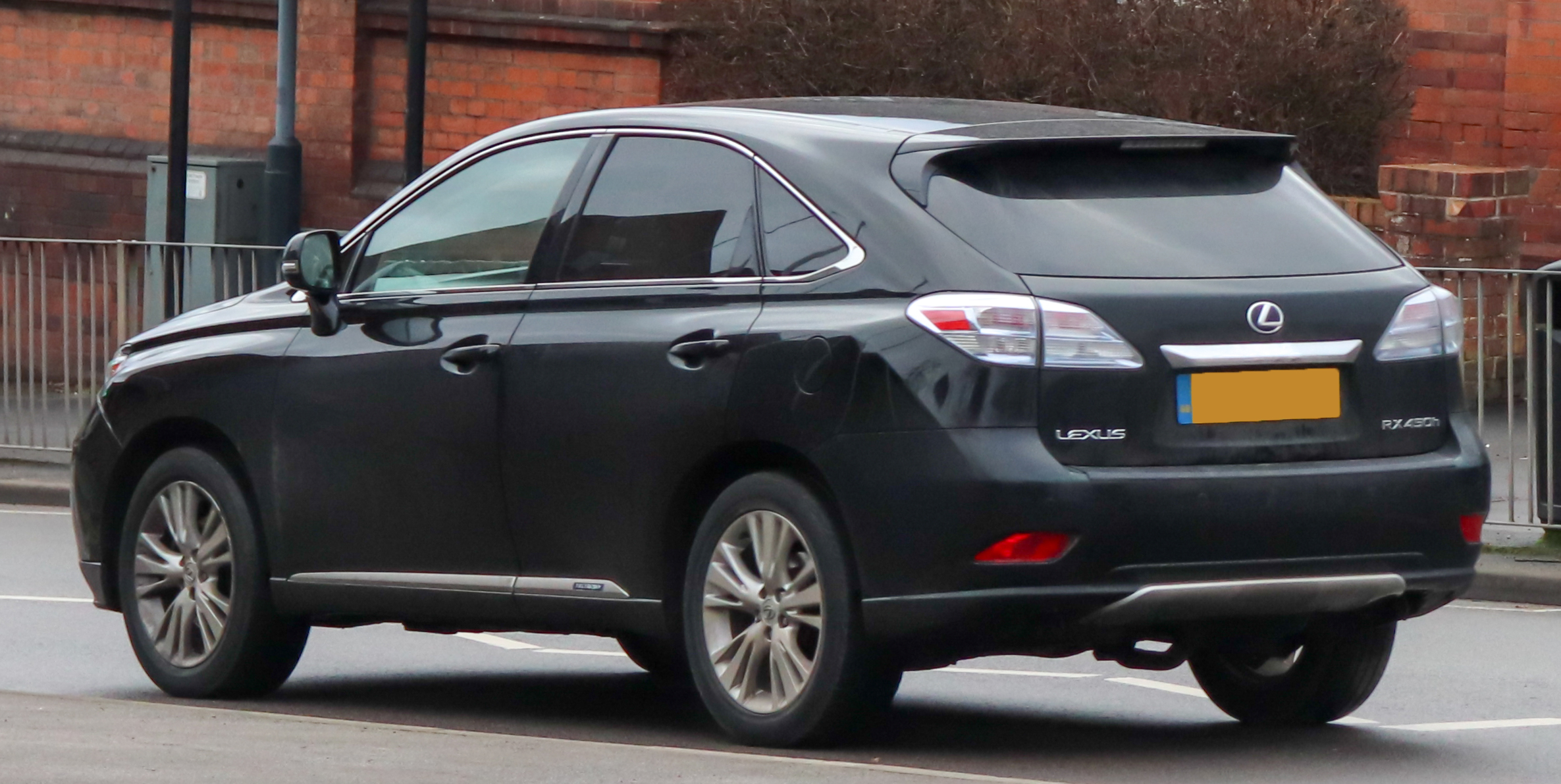
Pre-facelift Lexus RX 450h

Introduced in 2009 as a 2010 model year vehicle, the RX 450h (GLV10/GLV15) premiered alongside its non-hybrid counterpart, the RX 350. Manufacturer's specifications indicated largely identical outward dimensions for the RX 450h with the RX 350. The RX 450h was scheduled to go on sale in the U.S. in mid to late 2009, with sales introductions for the RX 450h in Asia (including Japan) and Europe in the same year. The RX 450h features an upgraded 3.5 L 2GR-FXE V6 engine (shared with the RX 350) which produces 245 hp (183 kW) at 6000 rpm, along with a new inverter which boosts total horsepower to 297 hp (221 kW) (with the electric motors providing an added 22 hp (16 kW)). The new inverter is 8 kg lighter, and more efficient. Up to three electric motors are used in the hybrid system, including two dual motors for the forward wheels (123 kW output), and a third for the rear wheels on the AWD model (50 kW; engages when slippage is detected or the throttle pressed firmly). The RX 450h V6 engine now runs on the Atkinson cycle for added efficiency. Compared to the prior Otto cycle system, the Atkinson cycle has a lower compression ratio, along with higher expansion ratio inside engine cylinders. This system uses less energy to form fuel-air mixtures, and releases more energy. A lighter, more free-flowing oil (0W-20) is also used, reducing friction energy loss and oil pump power requirements. Two additional systems are added to the RX 450h's Lexus Hybrid Drive powertrain, an exhaust heat recovery system to reduce engine warm-up periods (optimizing engine start-stop times, particularly in cold conditions), and a cooled exhaust gas-recirculation system to reduce fuel pumping loss. The electric motors use the first automotive application of liquid cooling on both sides of the high-current transistors, allowing greater contribution from the electric motors versus the gasoline engine.

Fuel efficiency for the RX 450h, according to EPA testing, is increased by twenty percent over the previous RX 400h. Initial manufacturer data pointed to an increase of at least eight percent over the prior model. In the U.S., the RX 450h is certified with a 2009 EPA fuel economy rating of 32 mpg city, 28 highway for the FWD model, and 30 mpg city, 28 highway for the AWD model. This 30 mpg combined rating compares with the 20 mpg combined rating of the non-hybrid RX model. The powertrain is linked to an instrument panel Eco light indicator, which enables drivers to monitor their fuel efficiency as it correlates with accelerator modulation.

In August 2010, Lexus began offering the RX 270 (AGL10), a front-wheel drive model with a 2.7-liter 1AR-FE inline-four engine, in Japan, China, and Russia. The RX 270 was a new entry-level offering for the RX lineup, produced with a lower base price and fewer emissions. It was introduced at the 2010 Moscow Auto Show, and aimed to circumvent the additional taxes applied to automobiles with large engine displacements and higher emissions; import cars in China over 3.0 L are subject to additional fees.

In July 2010, Bloomberg reported that an all-electric Lexus RX had been developed in partnership with Tesla Motors. The RX was fitted with a Tesla-designed battery pack, and is to be used as a test mule for electric vehicle development.

=== 2012–2015 ===
A facelift was designed through late 2010 and patented on 7 January 2011 under European design registration number 001845801-0004. The facelift was unveiled at the March 2012 Geneva Motor Show with new wheels, interior colors, new head and tail lamps and new grilles. New LED running lights were introduced as well. The F Sport was introduced, with a honeycomb grille, 8-speed automatic transmission, and a unique sportier interior. In the US, the new model uses the Lexus Enform telematics system, which includes the Safety Connect SOS system and Shazam tagging. Sales began worldwide in April 2012 for the RX 350 and RX 450h, with sales for the F-Sport variants starting in July of the same year.

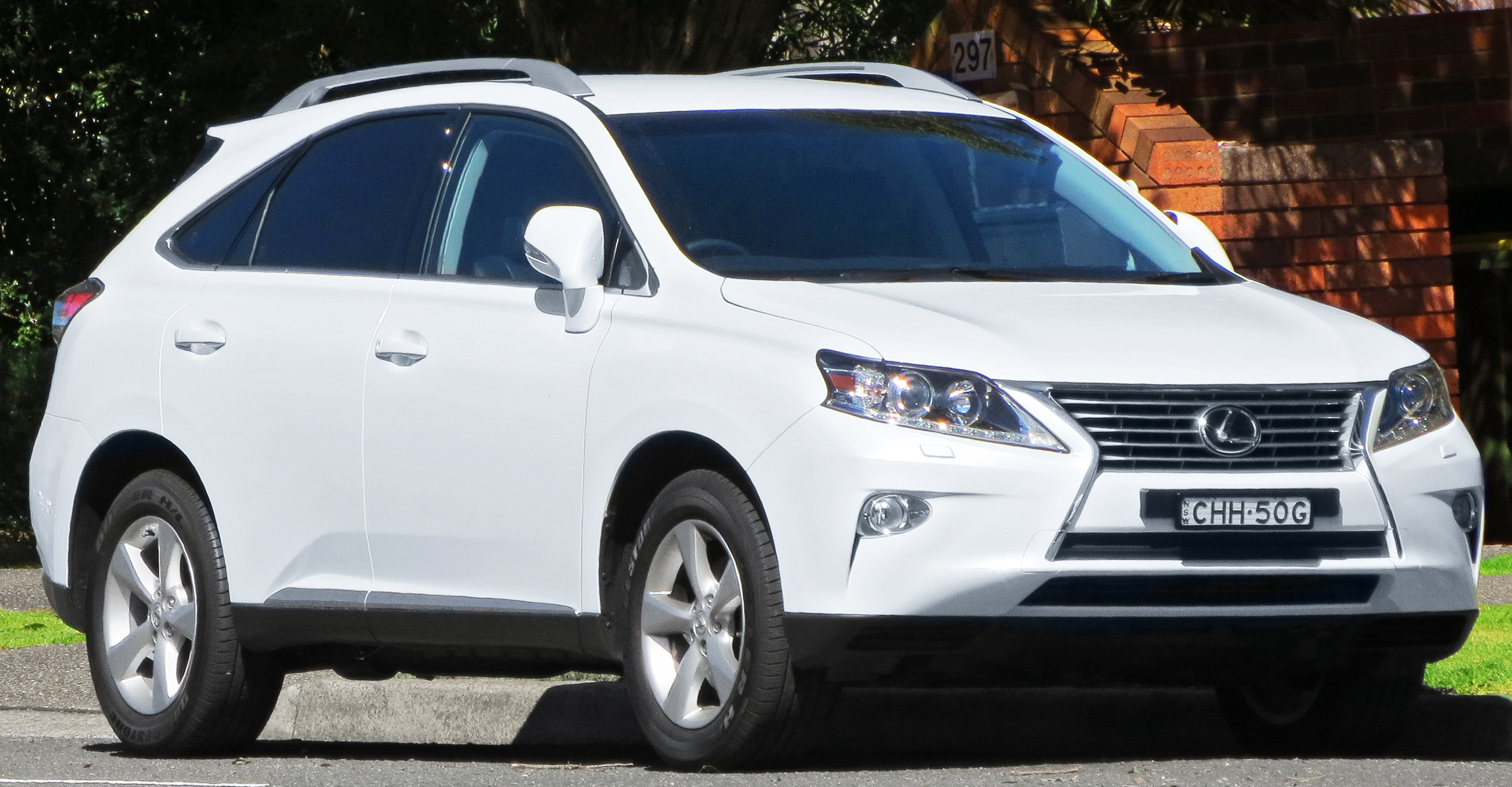
RX 350 (facelift)

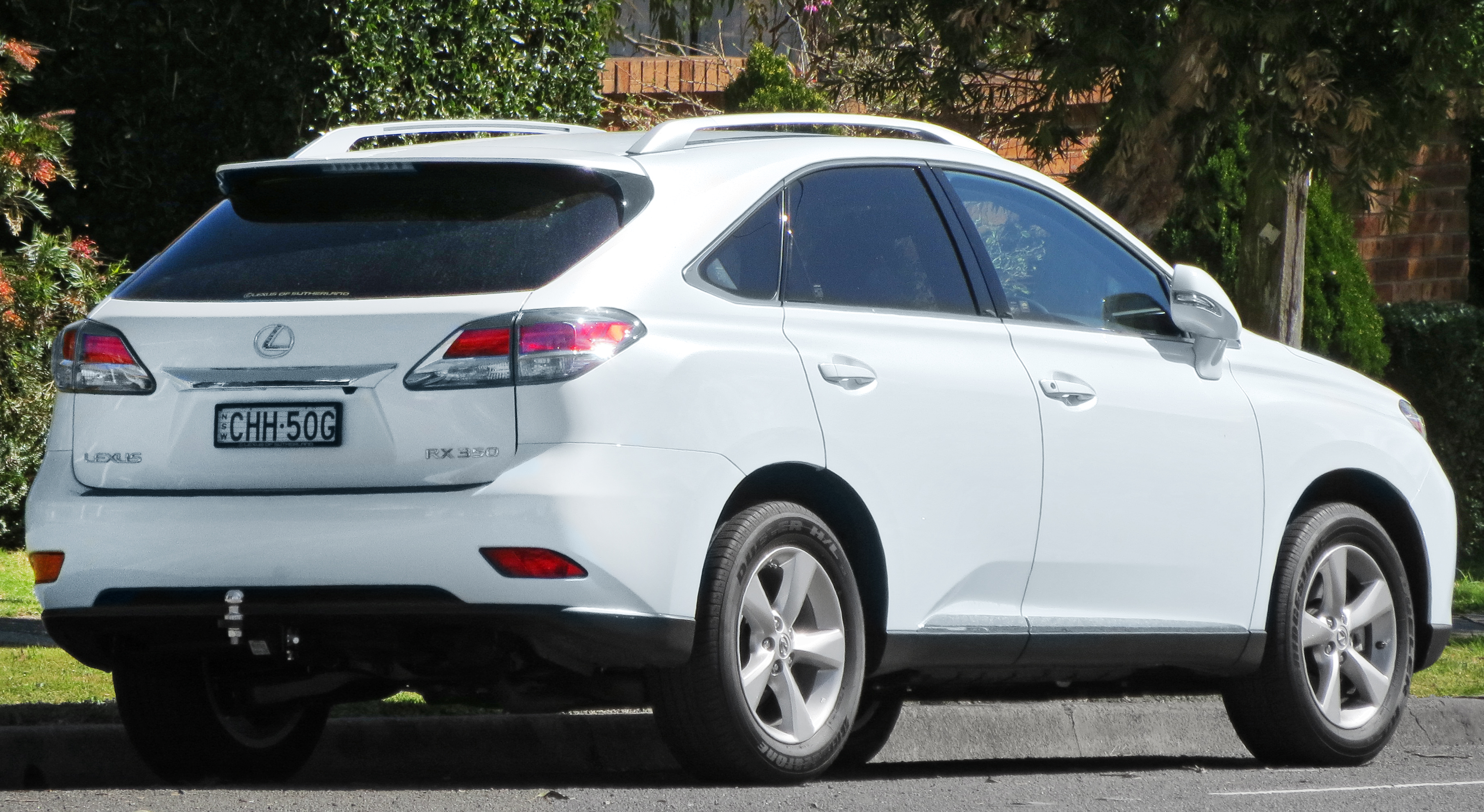
RX 350 (facelift)

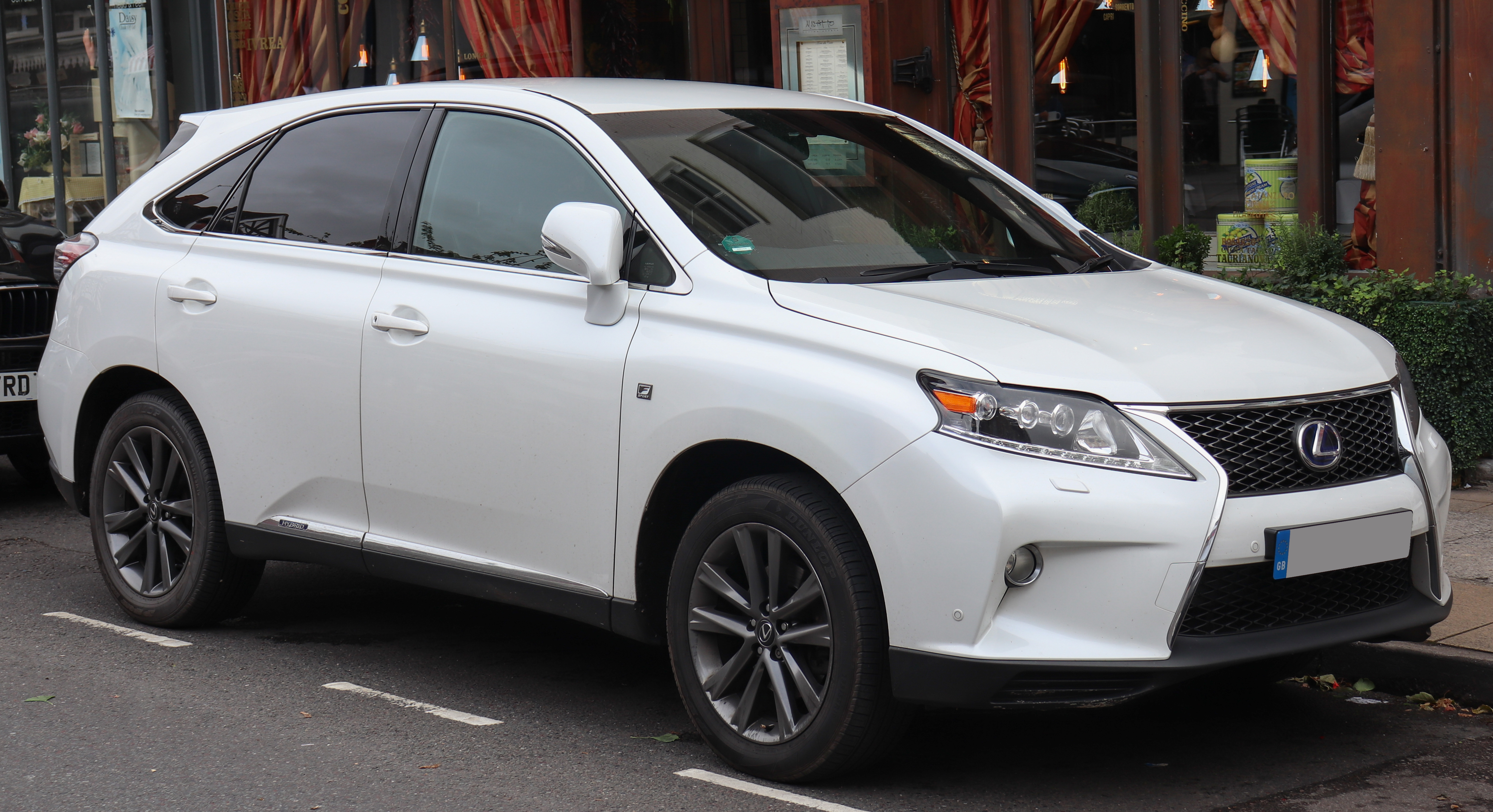
RX 450h (facelift)

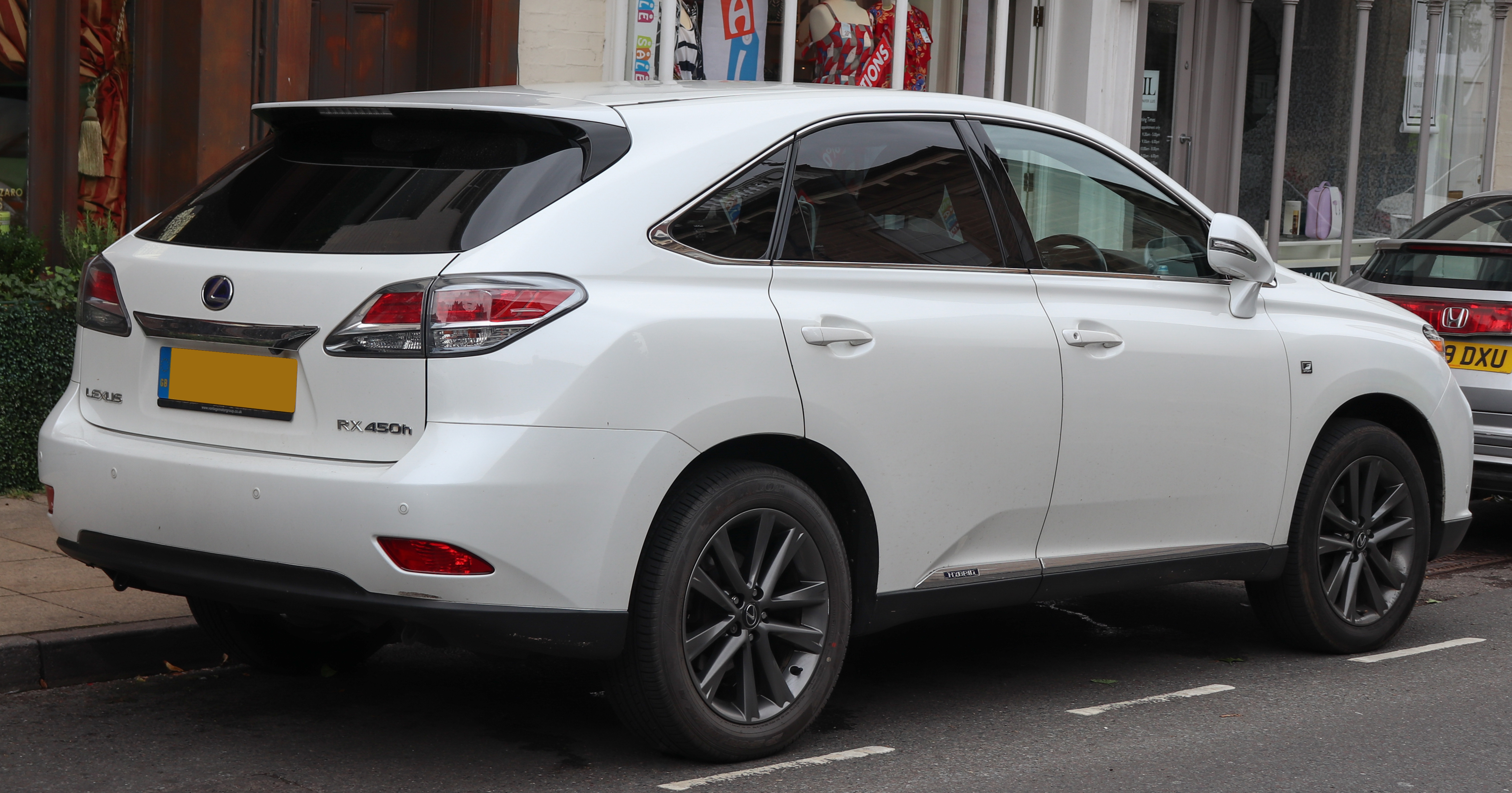
RX 450h (facelift)

Several awards won by the third-generation Lexus RX include AutoPacific Vehicle Satisfaction Award for Luxury Crossover SUV, Kelley Blue Book Best Resale Value Award for Luxury Utility Vehicle, and Residual Value Award for Near Luxury SUV from Automotive Lease Guide. The Insurance Institute for Highway Safety (IIHS) has awarded the RX 350 its Top Safety Pick accolade. In 2013, J.D. Power and Associates named the RX as the most dependable vehicle in the U.S.; it was the first time a SUV/crossover had ever been listed as such.

The U.S. National Highway Traffic Safety Administration (NHTSA) crash test results has given the RX 350 the maximum five star rating in the Frontal Driver, Frontal Passenger, Side Driver, and Side Rear Passenger categories, and four of five stars in the Rollover category at a risk of 16.4%. The Insurance Institute for Highway Safety rated the RX 350 a Top Safety Pick given "Good" overall ratings in both frontal offset and side crash tests, the RX also received "Good" ratings in all 14 measured categories. In 2014 (for the 2015 U.S. model year), the North American Lexus RX 350 gains new standard equipment such as the popular display audio package and LED front fog lamps. Navigation equipped models receive an upgraded 19 inch wheel finish as well as an easier to use remote touch controller. The 2015 model year F-Sport models now have the option of a cabernet red interior.

=== Safety ===
2015 Lexus RX350 SUV AWD NHTSA
Overall:	5/5 stars
Frontal driver:	4/5 stars
Frontal passenger:	4/5 stars
Side driver:	5/5 stars
Side passenger:	5/5 stars
Side pole driver:	5/5 stars
Rollover AWD:	16.4%

IIHS
Category	Rating
Moderate overlap frontal offset	Good
Side impact	Good
Roof strength	Good^{1}

^{1} strength-to-weight ratio: 4.27

== Fourth generation (AL20; 2015) ==
Fourth generation
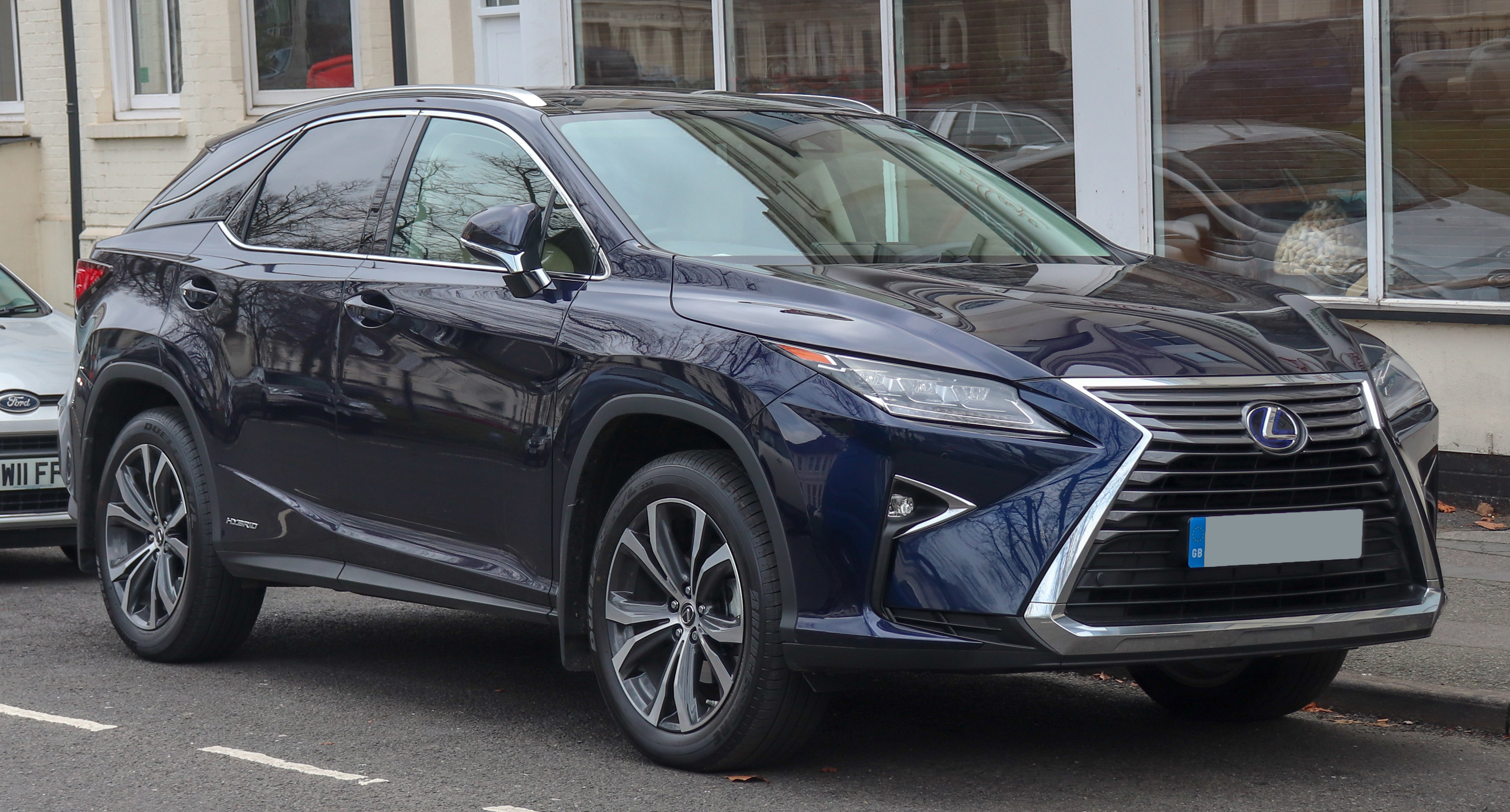
- 2018 Lexus RX 450h Luxury pre-facelift (GYL20, UK)

Overview
- Model code: AL20
- Production: October 2015 – September 2022
- Model years: 2016–2022
- Assembly: Japan: Miyawaka, Fukuoka (TMK); Canada: Cambridge, Ontario (TMMC)
- Designer: Gen Ikeda

Body and chassis
- Body style: 5-door SUV
- Platform: Toyota K platform
- Related: Lexus ES (XV60); Toyota Highlander/Kluger (XU50)

Powertrain
- Engine: Gasoline: 2.0 L 8AR-FTS turbo I4 (RX 200t/300); 3.5 L 2GR-FKS V6 (RX 350); Gasoline hybrid: 3.5 L 2GR-FXS V6 (RX 450h)
- Power output: List: 175 kW (235 hp; 238 PS) (RX 200t/300); 220 kW (295 hp; 299 PS) (RX 350); 193 kW (259 hp; 262 PS) (RX 450h, gasoline engine only); 230 kW (308 hp; 313 PS) (RX 450h, combined system output)
- Transmission: 6-speed automatic Toyota U661 E/F (RX 200t/300); 8-speed automatic Aisin AWF8F35 (RX 350); eCVT P313/Q211 (RX 450h)
- Hybrid drivetrain: Power-split (450h)

Dimensions
- Wheelbase: 2,790 mm (109.8 in)
- Length: 4,890 mm (192.5 in); L: 5,000 mm (196.9 in)
- Width: 1,895 mm (74.6 in)
- Height: 1,685–1,720 mm (66.3–67.7 in)
- Curb weight: 1,915–2,210 kg (4,222–4,872 lb)

Chronology
- Successor: Lexus TX (for RX L)

=== 2015–2019 ===
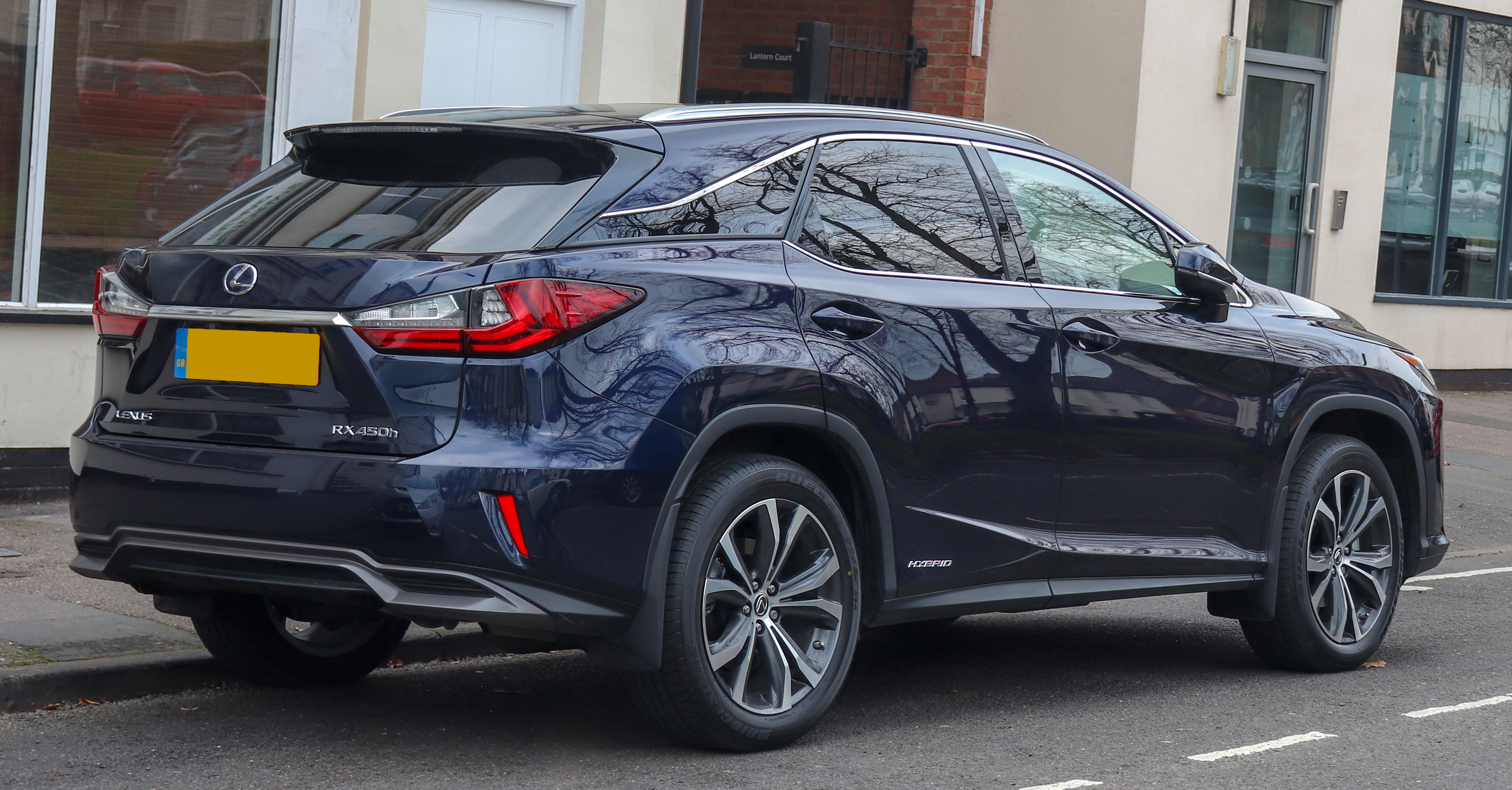
2018 Lexus RX 450h Luxury pre-facelift (GYL20, UK)

The fourth generation of the RX was presented at the April 2015 New York International Auto Show and the September 2015 Frankfurt Motor Show and released in late 2015. Departing from the clear taillight design, the RX continues in the design way of the RC (XC10), the IS (XE30), and the NX (AZ10) which were recently introduced at the time. The front features the brand's "Spindle Grille", which was introduced on the LF-Gh (GS Mk4 Concept) in 2011. The first production vehicle it was introduced on was the CT hatchback in 2011. On the grille is a chrome-plated border, and the headlights feature triple L-shape LEDs. Two headlight designs are available, consisting of a compact Bi-LED which comes standard, or an L-shape LED, accompanied by 18 separate LEDs. The "Intelligent High Beam" (IHB) is a system that automatically switches between high and low beams, depending on driving situation. The rear also features what the brand calls the "spindle design" theme, with rear L-shaped taillights which wrap around the rear fender section to enhance functionality. The C-pillar is blacked out which are to give a floating roof effect. General exterior features include flush-fitting headlight washers, dual exhausts, an optional panoramic sunroof, aluminum roof rails, redesigned door handles which include the SmartAccess card key, and a door handle illumination. The drag coefficient on the fourth-generation RX had reached 0.33 C_{d}. The aerodynamic enhancements not only improve the drag coefficient, but also help with stability and cabin noise.

Retaining a few of its exterior colors from the previous generation, the new colors include the Caviar, Autumn Shimmer and Nightfall Mica. The paint features a scratch-resistant coat that restores itself if scratched using a high-performance macromolecular polymer. The paint also features significant gloss retention to help maintain the gloss and color over a long period of time. The vehicle is larger than the previous generation, with a 50 mm (2 in) increase in wheelbase, providing more interior room throughout. To counter issues with the previous version's F-Sport ride quality being too firm, in the pursuit of sporty handling, the new generation features an Adaptive Variable Suspension (AVS) to adjust ride quality as needed. An active anti-roll bar from the European specification third generation RX was added to the F-Sport package. Twenty-inch alloy wheels are also available, as is a panoramic sunroof.

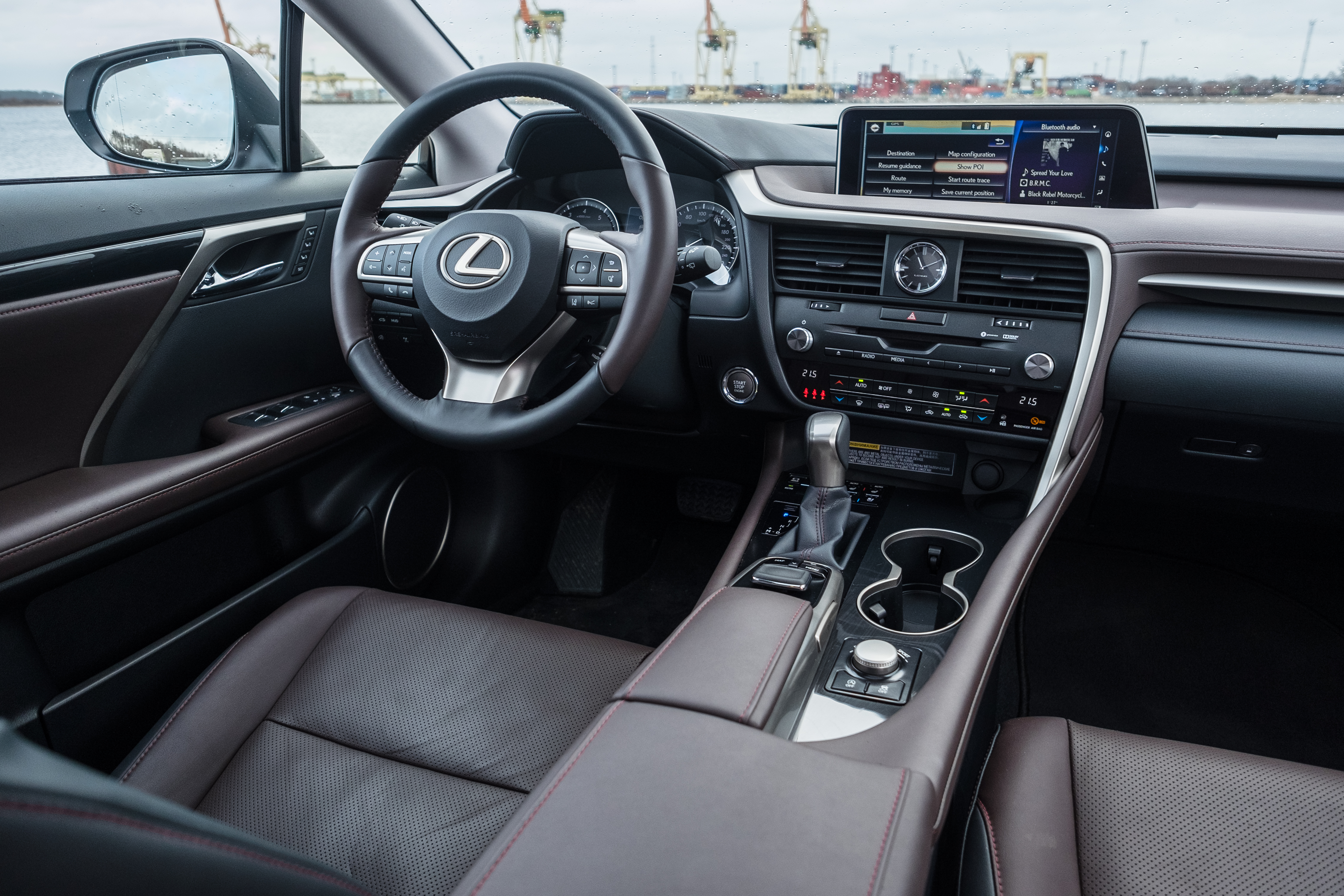
Interior (AGL20; pre-facelift)

The interior of the RX features round seat cushions, providing better support for the passengers. The driver and front passenger seats feature elegant quilting, harmonized with the interior door panel trim. The armrests now are less stiff, and use softer materials for a more comfortable ride. Like the door trim panels and back of the front seats, the armrest surfaces now feature a quilted pattern. For the first time on a Lexus, the interior door handles feature a knobless door lock for a more refined design.

The AL20 features a redesigned 8.0-inch infotainment display that is now based on a horizontal axis; the dashboard is lowered to give the vehicle a spacious feeling. The 12.3-inch display is optional, and adds premium features such as wider viewing, navigation integrated into the dashboard, a premium audio system, and the Lexus Enform App. The 15-speaker Mark Levinson premium audio system is optional, and rear-seat entertainment.

Safety systems consist of the Pre-Collision System with Pedestrian Detection, Lane Departure Alert (LDA) with Steering Assist, Intelligent High Beam (IHB), Lexus Safety System (from 2017) and All-Speed Dynamic Radar Cruise Control. General systems include anti-lock brakes, ABS brakes, stability control, front-impact airbags, side impact airbags, overhead airbags, knee airbags, pretensioners, anti-whiplash, and a security system which detects vehicle intrusion. The RX also adds an ignition disable device, which prevents the vehicle from starting unless the original key is used.

From the 2017 model year, the F-Sport Package is now available on front-wheel drive models. All F-Sport models are equipped with a heated steering wheel. All models are now equipped with Lexus Safety System+. For the 2018 model year, the RX L was introduced. The 450h receives a cheaper trim level in its lineup that decreases its price. For the United States, the Premium package for the 450h adds wood and leather interior trim, automatic folding exterior mirrors, and for the driver's seat, steering wheel, and mirrors, the RX lets you recall recent changes from when the owner was last in the vehicle. The RX adds primarily technical changes for the 2019 model year. Adjustments include optional parking sensors with blind-spot monitoring, rear cross-traffic alert, exterior automatically dimming mirrors, and an omnidirectional camera system. The Lexus Enform Remote app now features smart watch and the Amazon Alexa integration. A two-tone instrument panel is added on models equipped with the Premium package and the "Noble Brown" exterior color. Trims consist of the RX350, RX450h, RX350L, RX350 F-Sport, RX450hL, and the RX450h F-Sport.

=== RX L ===
In November 2017, Lexus announced three-row seven-passenger models of the RX, the RX 350 L and RX 450h L. The L model is 11 cm (4.3 in) longer than the two-row model but have the same wheelbase; it does not have a direct Toyota counterpart. The L model features a redesigned rear and a more upright rear window to maximize rear space. With all seats upright, the volume stands at 7 cu ft (200 L). Folding the rear seat, the volume triples to 23 cu ft (650 L). With all seats folded, volume stands at 58 cu ft (1,600 L), up 2 cubic feet from the standard length RX.

The L is available in models consisting of the RX350L gasoline model and the RX450hL gasoline full hybrid. The RX L models were not continued for the next generation RX, instead it was replaced by a new larger model called the TX, since the RX L models were criticized for not having enough third row space compared to its competitors.

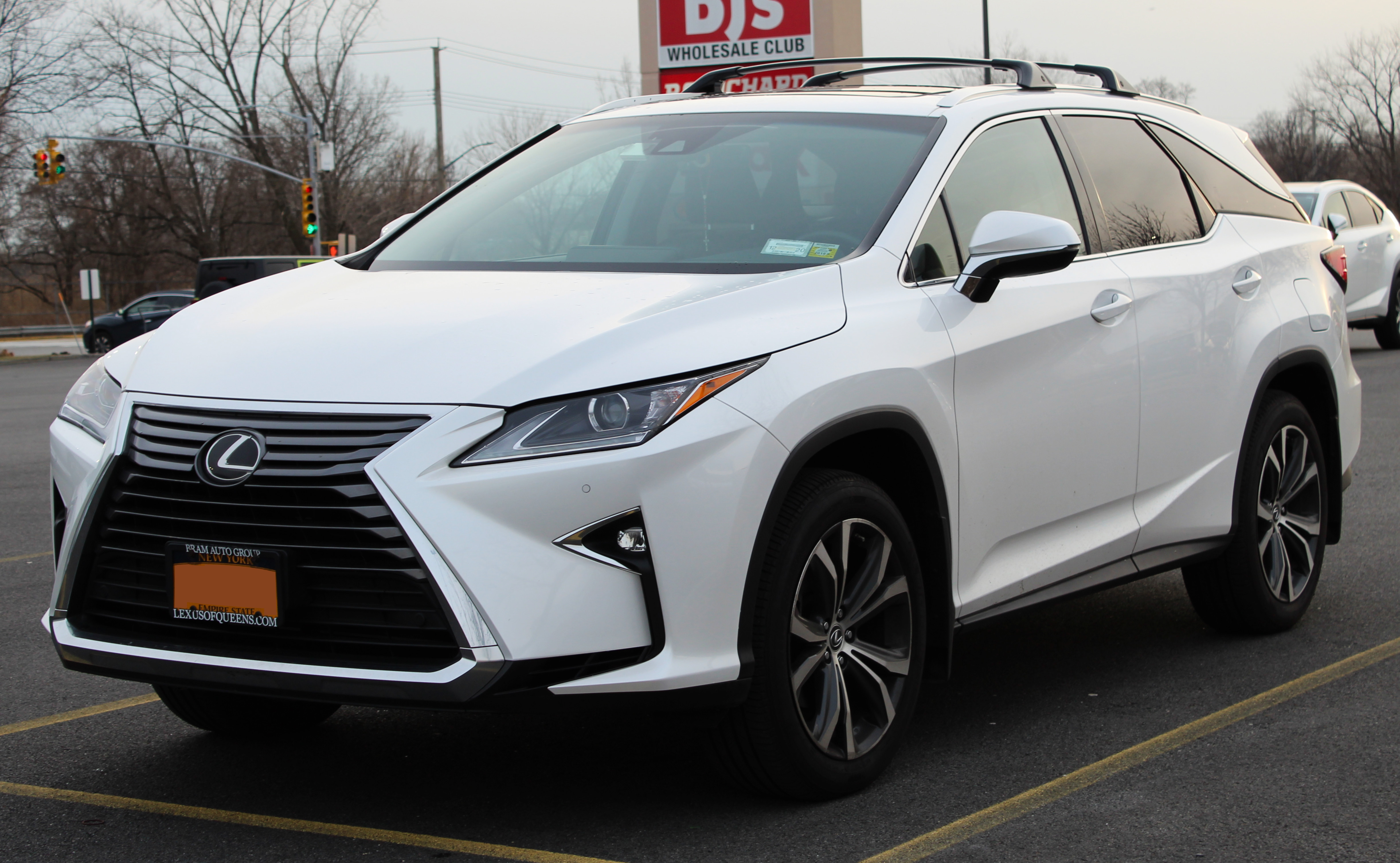
2018 Lexus RX 350L (GGL20, US)

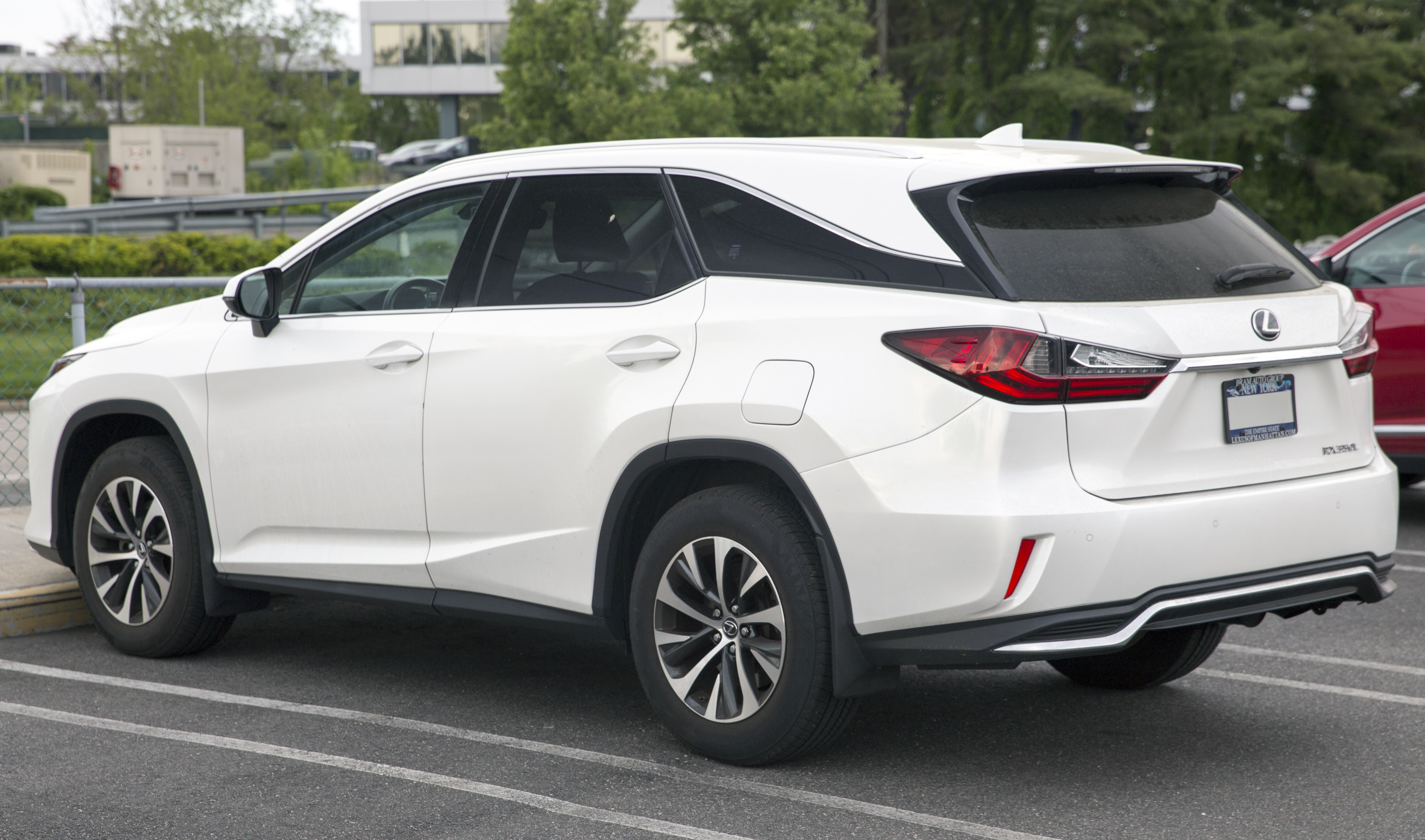
2018 Lexus RX 350L (GGL20, US)

=== 2019–2022 ===
The RX and RX L received a facelift in May 2019 for the 2020 model year. The facelifted model is equipped with the Lexus Safety System+ 2.0, upgraded from the Lexus Safety System+. For the interior, the standard 8.0-inch touchscreen was replaced by the 12.3-inch which was optional on the previous model. The Luxury trim was added to the 350 and the 450hL. For 2021, the "Black Line Special Edition" limited variant was added for F-Sport models. It features black 20-inch wheels, blue stitching for the leather interior, and either a white or medium blue exterior paint. Furthermore, in 2020, for the 2021 model year, both blind-spot monitoring and rear cross-traffic alert became standard, and wireless smartphone charging became available as an option. Smartphone mirroring systems (both Apple CarPlay and Android Auto) were also introduced. The "Glazed Caramel" color was available as an interior color and replaced the Noble Brown color. In 2021, for the 2022 model year daytime bicyclist detection and low-light pedestrian detection and with Road Sign Assists and Lane Tracing Assist became available. New color choices were available, including Cloudburst grey, Iridium, and Grecian Water. The Black Line model was available in 2022, with 2,500 examples built.

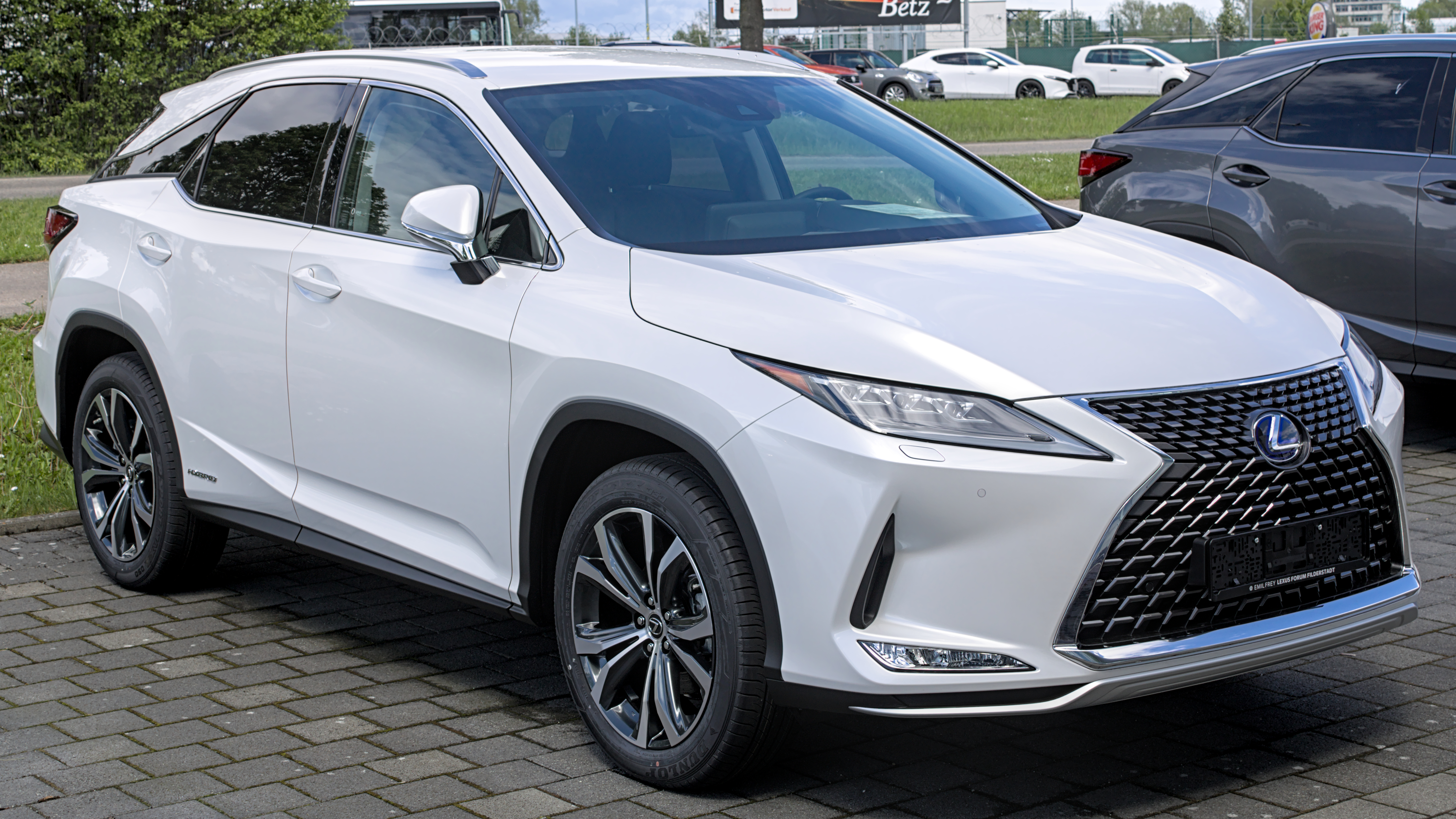
2021 Lexus RX 450h (GYL20; facelift)

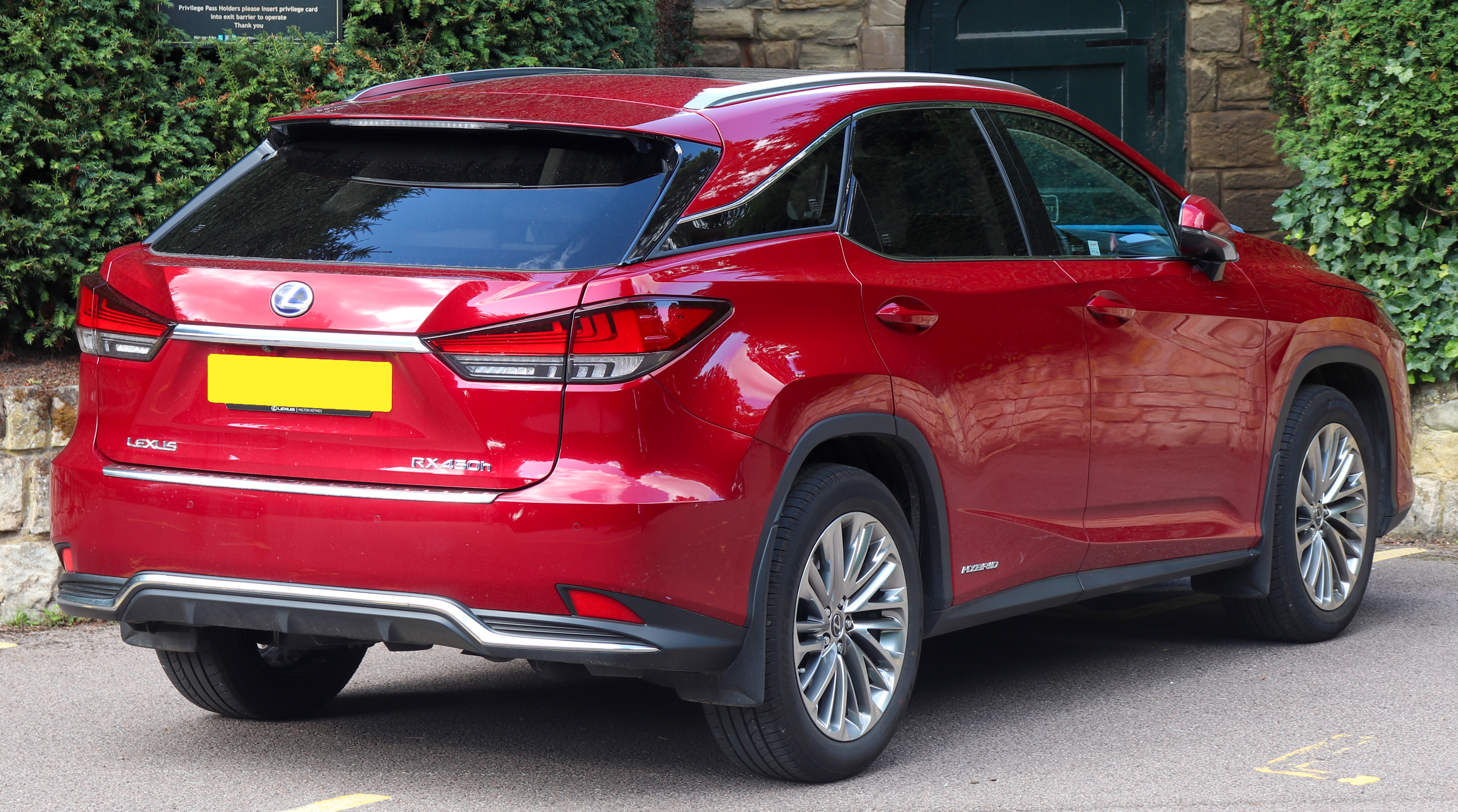
2020 Lexus RX 450h (GYL20; facelift)

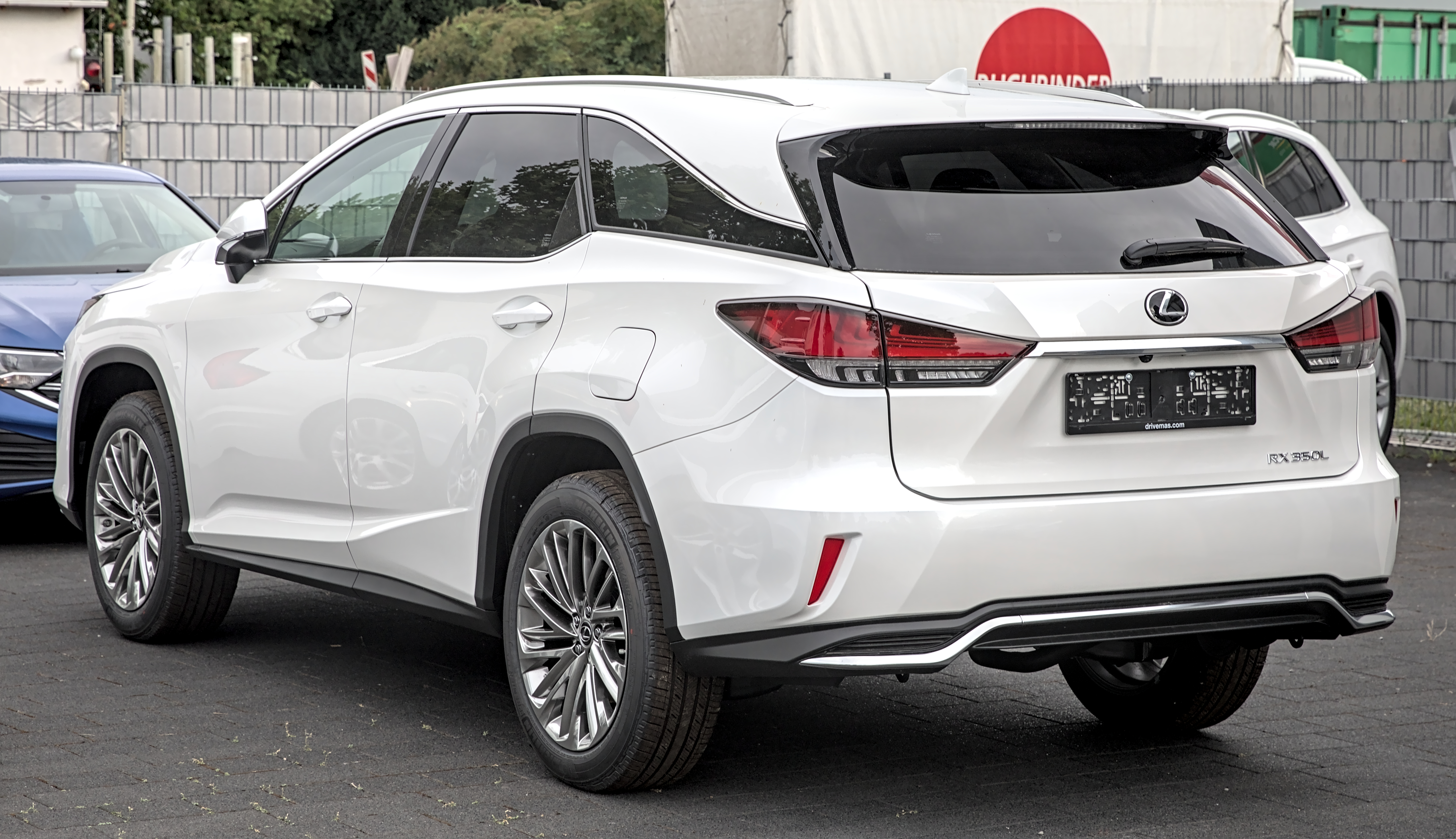
2022 Lexus RX 350L (GGL21; facelift)

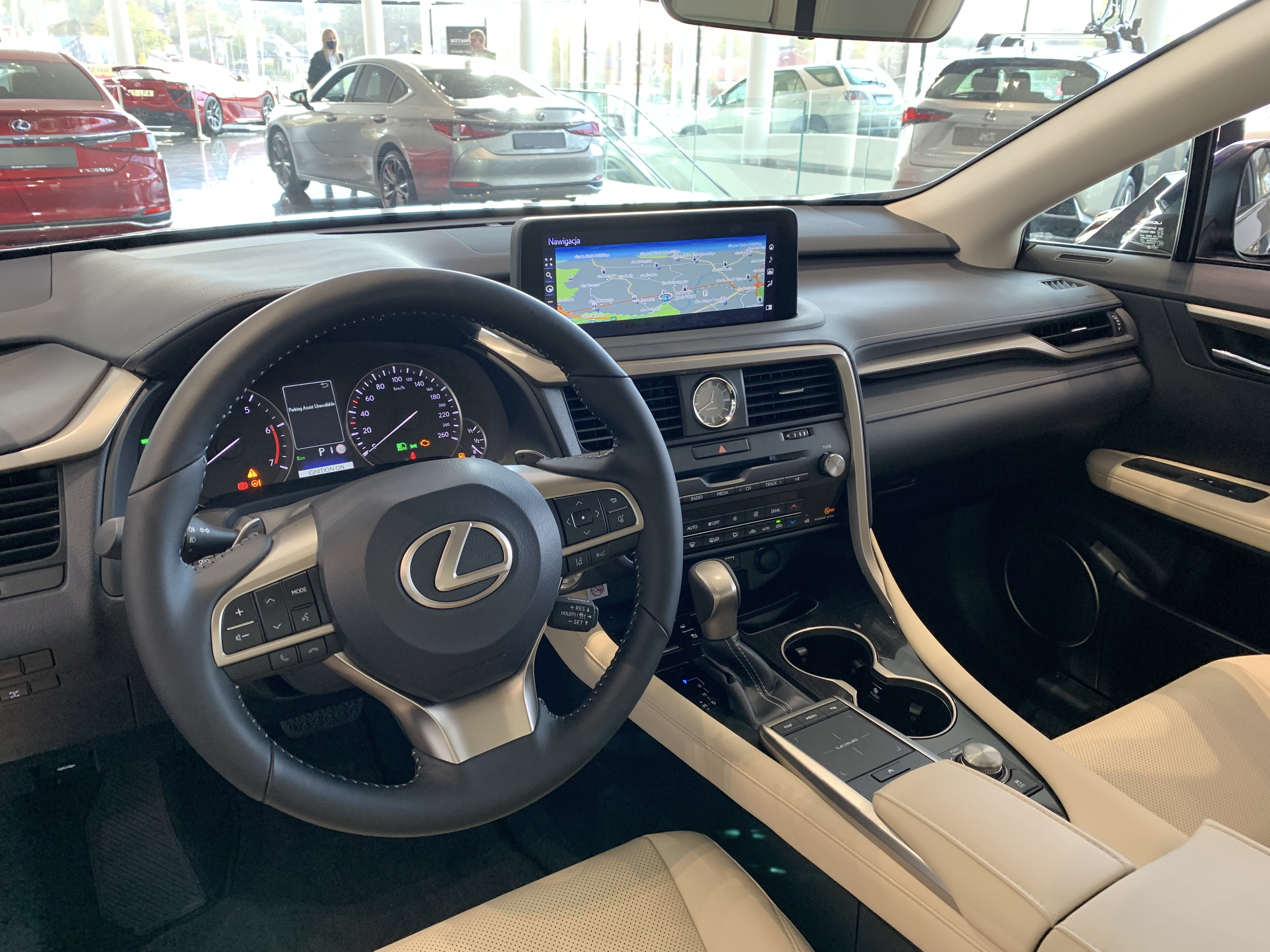
Interior (AGL20; facelift)

=== Models ===
==== AGL20 / AGL25 ====
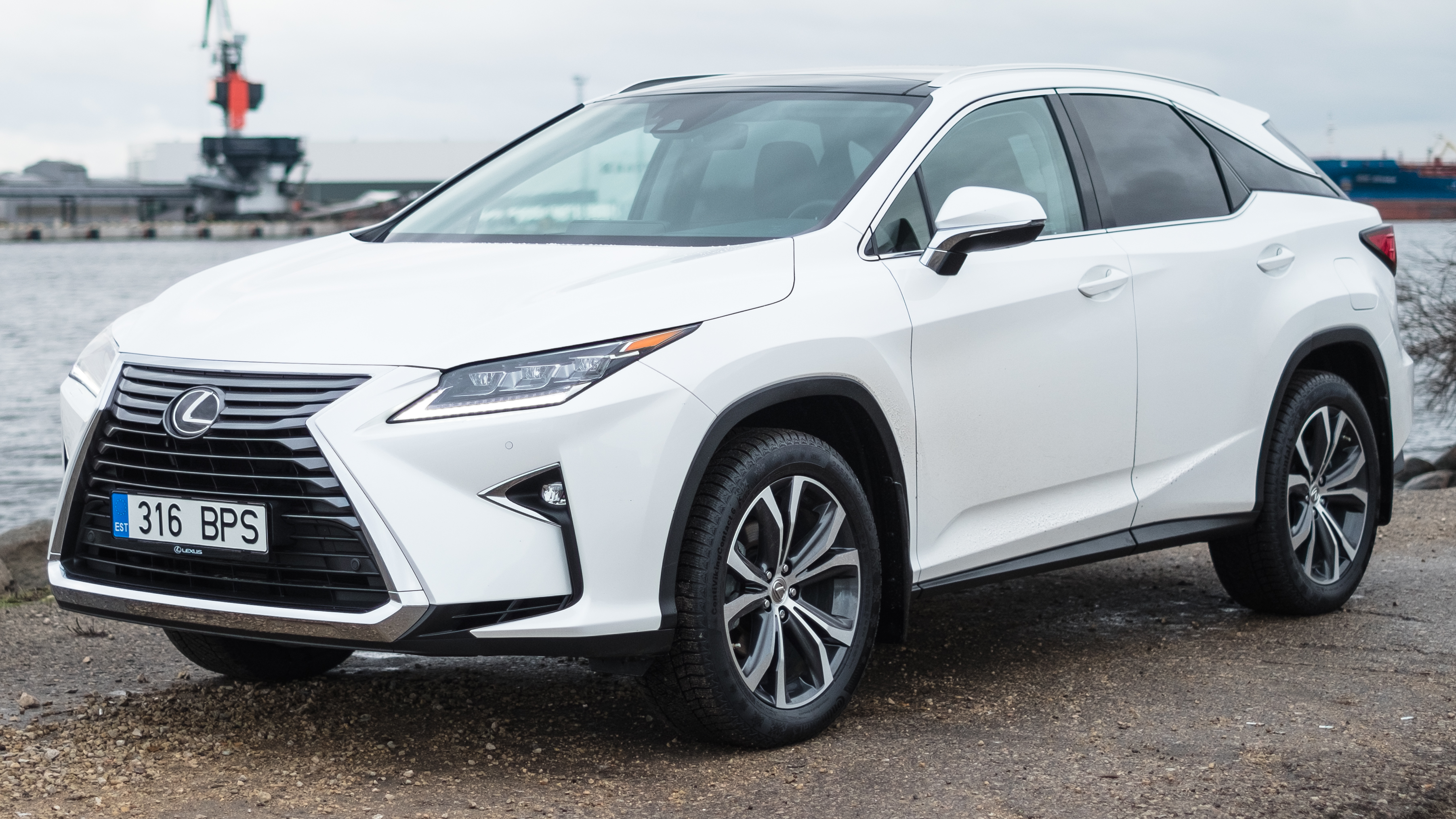
2016 Lexus RX 200t

The RX 200t FWD (AGL20) and the RX 200t AWD (AGL25) were revealed at the 2015 Auto Shanghai along with the facelifted Mk6 Lexus ES. Replacing the RX 270 (AGL10), the model is powered by the same 2.0-liter 8AR-FTS turbocharged inline-four engine as the NX 200t AGZ10. It is available in both front- and all-wheel drive. It was later renamed to RX 300 in 2018. It has a top speed of 200 km/h (120 mph) and a 0–100 km/h (62 mph) time of 9.7 seconds. Using its 2.0 I4 turbo, the RX 200t / 300 produces 235 hp (175 kW) or 238 hp (177 kW) depending on model, and 350 N⋅m (258 lb⋅ft).

==== GGL20 / GGL25 ====
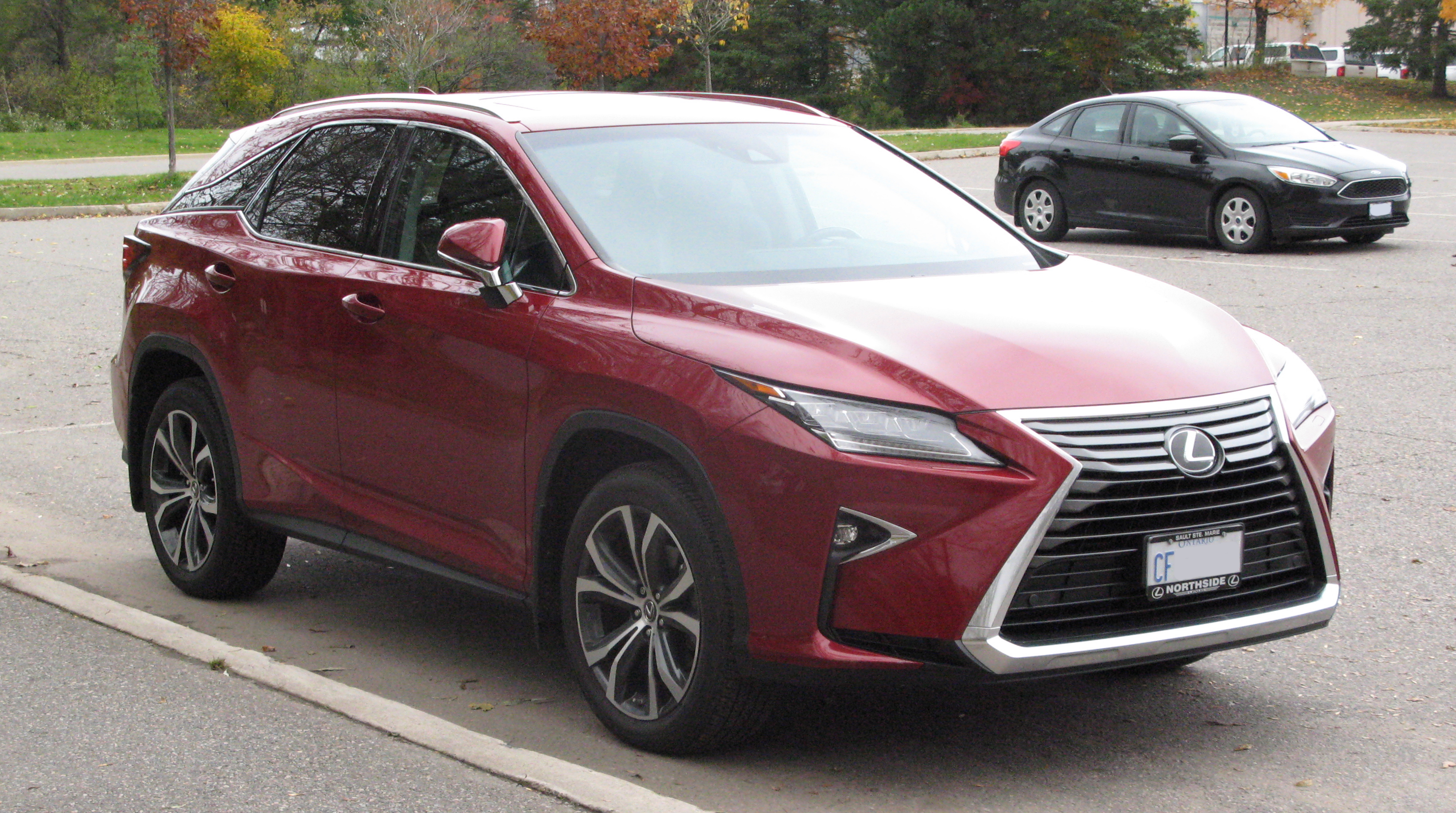
2018 Lexus RX 350

The RX 350 FWD (GGL20) and the RX 350 AWD (GGL25) features 3.5-liter V6 carried from the previous model, except an additional 25 hp (19 kW) was added, giving a total output of 295–300 hp (220–224 kW), depending on model. The extended length model's codes are GGL21 for the 350L and GGL26 for the 450hL. The 350 features Drive Mode Select, with Eco, Normal and Sport modes. The 12.3-inch screen comes on the 350. The vehicle has a top speed of 198–200 km/h (123–124 mph), and depending on model, has a 0–100 km/h (0–62 mph) time of around 8.5 seconds. With its 3.5 L 2GR-FKS engine, the 350 produces an output of either 295 hp (220 kW) or 300 hp (224 kW) depending on trim.

==== GYL20 / GYL25 ====
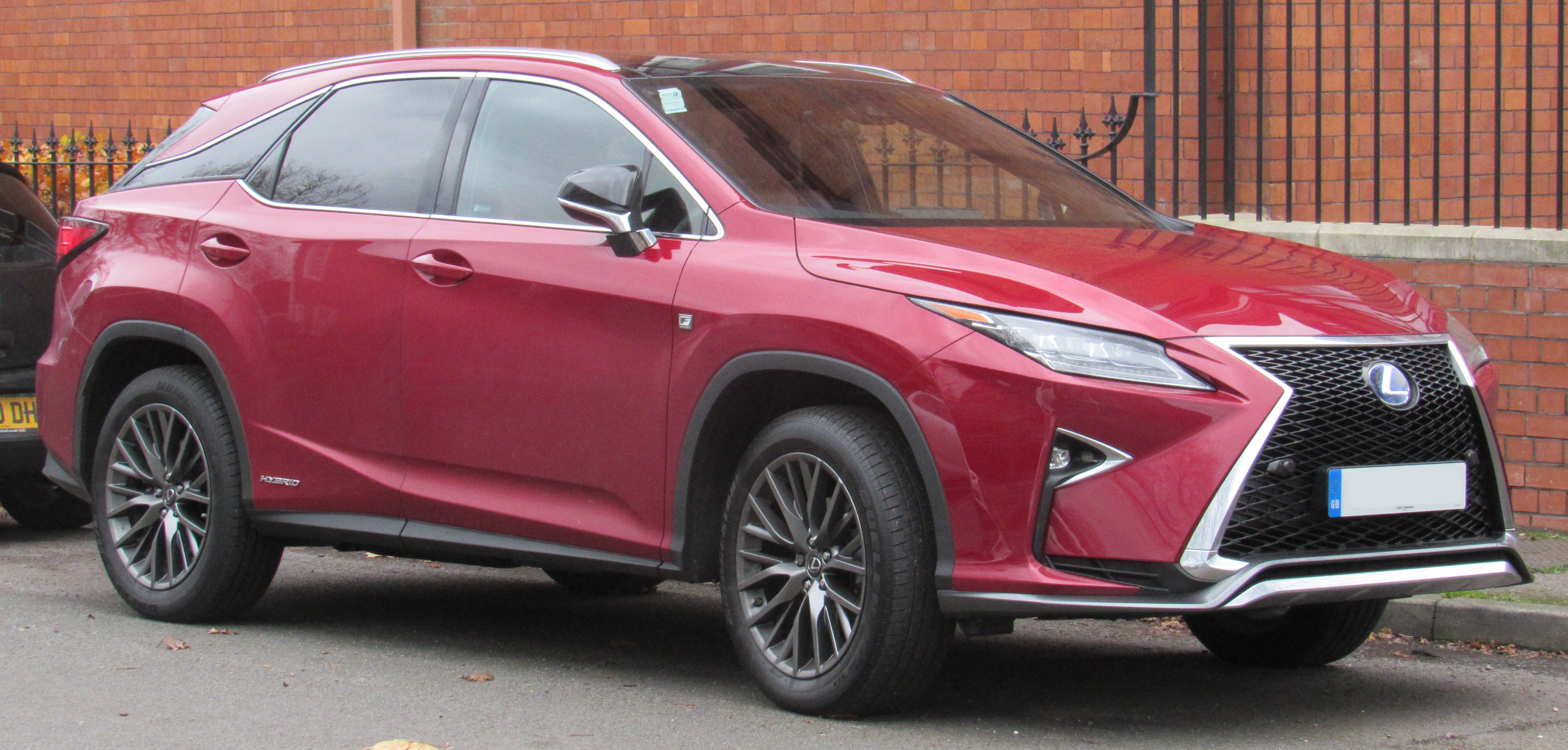
2016 Lexus RX 450h

The RX 450h FWD (GYL20) and the RX 450h AWD (GYL25) is the hybrid electric model of the 350 model. It features the same V6 engine as the 350, but adds two synchronous motors and an 1.872 kWh NiMH battery. Replacing the original AL10 450h, the 450h uses an electrically controlled continuously variable transmission (eCVT) with manual shifting mode. In terms of performance, its top speed is 200 km/h (125 mph), and the 0 to 100 km/h (62 mph) time is 7.7 seconds. The V6 AWD 450h uses the E-Four all-wheel drive system.

The 450h features motors at both the front and rear axles. The engine has an output of 195 kW (262 hp) and 335 N⋅m (247 lbf⋅ft). The front motor produces 125 kW (167 hp) and 335 N⋅m (247 lbf⋅ft), and the less powerful rear motor produces 51 kW (68 hp) and 139 N⋅m (103 lbf⋅ft). The engine and dual-motors combined produce a full output of 230 kW (308 hp).

=== Powertrain ===
Type	Model	Engine code	Displ.	Power	Torque	Combined system output	Electric motor	Battery	Trans.	Model code	Layout	Cal. years
Gasoline	200t/300	8AR-FTS	1,998 cc (2.0 L) I4	238 hp (177 kW; 241 PS) @ 4,800-5,600 rpm	350 N⋅m (35.7 kg⋅m; 258 lb⋅ft) @ 1,650-4,000 rpm	-	-	-	6-speed automatic	AGL20	FWD	2016–2022
Gasoline	200t/300	8AR-FTS	1,998 cc (2.0 L) I4	238 hp (177 kW; 241 PS) @ 4,800-5,600 rpm	350 N⋅m (35.7 kg⋅m; 258 lb⋅ft) @ 1,650-4,000 rpm	-	-	-	6-speed automatic	AGL25	AWD	2016–2022
Gasoline	350	2GR-FKS	3,456 cc (3.5 L) V6	300 hp (224 kW; 304 PS) @ 6,300 rpm	363 N⋅m (37.0 kg⋅m; 268 lb⋅ft) @ 4,700 rpm	-	-	-	8-speed automatic	GGL20 (Note: GGL21 for RX L)	FWD	2015–2022
Gasoline	350	2GR-FKS	3,456 cc (3.5 L) V6	300 hp (224 kW; 304 PS) @ 6,300 rpm	363 N⋅m (37.0 kg⋅m; 268 lb⋅ft) @ 4,700 rpm	-	-	-	8-speed automatic	GGL25 (Note: GGL26 for RX L)	AWD	2015–2022
Gasoline hybrid	450h	2GR-FXS	3,456 cc (3.5 L) V6	Engine: 262 hp (195 kW; 266 PS) @ 6,000 rpm Front motor: 167 hp (125 kW; 169 PS) Rear motor: 68 hp (51 kW; 69 PS)	Engine: 335 N⋅m (34.2 kg⋅m; 247 lb⋅ft) @ 4,600 rpm Front motor: 335 N⋅m (34.2 kg⋅m; 247 lb⋅ft) Rear motor: 139 N⋅m (14.2 kg⋅m; 103 lb⋅ft)	313 hp (233 kW; 317 PS)	2x synchronous motor	1.872 kWh, 288 V NiMH	eCVT	GYL20	FWD	2016–2022
Gasoline hybrid	450h	2GR-FXS	3,456 cc (3.5 L) V6	Engine: 262 hp (195 kW; 266 PS) @ 6,000 rpm Front motor: 167 hp (125 kW; 169 PS) Rear motor: 68 hp (51 kW; 69 PS)	Engine: 335 N⋅m (34.2 kg⋅m; 247 lb⋅ft) @ 4,600 rpm Front motor: 335 N⋅m (34.2 kg⋅m; 247 lb⋅ft) Rear motor: 139 N⋅m (14.2 kg⋅m; 103 lb⋅ft)	313 hp (233 kW; 317 PS)	2x synchronous motor	1.872 kWh, 288 V NiMH	eCVT	GYL25	AWD	2016–2022

=== Safety ===
ANCAP test results* Lexus RX all variants (2015, aligned with Euro NCAP)
Test	Points	%
Overall:	5 /5 stars	
Adult occupant:	31.8	83%
Child occupant:	40.3	82%
Pedestrian:	28.7	79%
Safety assist:	9.7	74%

The fourth-generation RX was awarded "Top Safety Pick+" in 2016 and 2017 by IIHS.

IIHS scores (2017)
Small overlap front (Driver)	Good	
Moderate overlap front (Original Test)	Good	
Side (Original Test)	Good	
Roof strength	Good	
Head restraints and seats	Good	
Headlights	Acceptable	Marginal
Front crash prevention (Vehicle-to-vehicle)	Advanced	
Child seat anchors (LATCH) ease of use	Good+	

Euro NCAP test results* Lexus RX 450h (2015)
Test	Points	%
Overall:	5 /5 stars	
Adult occupant:	34.8	91%
Child occupant:	40.3	82%
Pedestrian:	28.7	79%
Safety assist:	10.0	77%

== Fifth generation (ALA10/ALH10; 2022) ==
Fifth generation
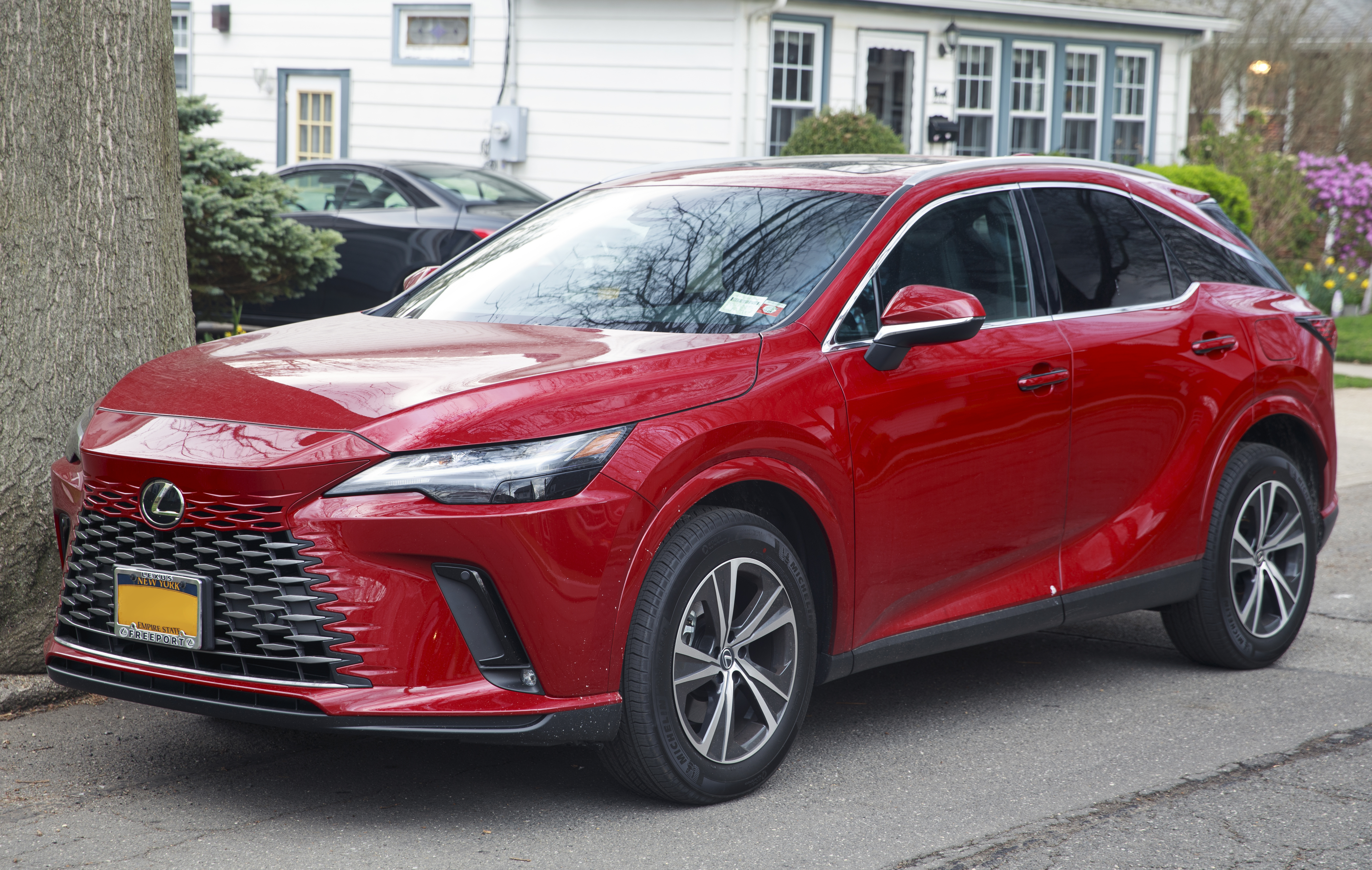
- Lexus RX 350

Overview
- Model code: ALA10; ALH10
- Production: October 2022 – present
- Model years: 2023–present
- Assembly: Japan: Miyawaka, Fukuoka (TMK); Canada: Cambridge, Ontario (TMMC)
- Designer: Jōta Kusakari

Body and chassis
- Platform: TNGA: GA-K
- Related: Lexus TX; Toyota Highlander / Kluger / Crown Kluger (XU70); Toyota Grand Highlander

Powertrain
- Engine: Gasoline: 2.0 L S20A-FTS turbo I4 (RX 300; SALA15, China only); 2.4 L T24A-FTS turbo I4 (RX 350; TALA10/15); Gasoline hybrid: 2.5 L A25A-FXS I4 (RX 350h; AALH10); 2.4 L T24A-FTS turbo I4 (RX 500h; TALH17); Gasoline plug-in hybrid: 2.5 L A25A-FXS I4 (RX 450h+; AALH16)
- Electric motor: List: 2× permanent magnet synchronous: RX 350h/450h+: 5NM (front); 4NM (rear); RX 500h: 1ZM (front); 1YM (rear)
- Power output: List: RX 300: 182 kW (244 hp; 247 PS); RX 350: 205 kW (275 hp; 279 PS); RX 350h: 140 kW (188 hp; 190 PS) (gasoline engine only); 183 kW (245 hp; 249 PS) (combined system output); RX 500h: 202 kW (271 hp; 275 PS) (gasoline engine only); 64 kW (86 hp; 87 PS) (1ZM motor); 76 kW (102 hp; 103 PS) (1YM motor); 274 kW (367 hp; 373 PS) (combined system output); RX 450h+: 136 kW (182 hp; 185 PS) (gasoline engine only); 134 kW (180 hp; 182 PS) (5NM motor); 40 kW (54 hp; 54 PS) (4NM motor); 227 kW (304 hp; 309 PS) (combined system output)
- Transmission: 8-speed AWF8F35/UA81E "Direct Shift-8AT" automatic (RX 300/350); eCVT (RX 350h/450h+); 6-speed "Direct Shift-6AT" automatic + "eAxle" (RX 500h)
- Hybrid drivetrain: Power-split (RX 350h); Parallel (RX 500h); Plug-in (RX 450h+)
- Battery: 1.29 kW·h nickel–metal hydride (RX 350h); 1.44 kW·h nickel–metal hydride (RX 500h); 18.1 kW·h lithium-ion (RX 450h+)
- Electric range: 86 km (53 mi) (WLTC, RX 450h+)

Dimensions
- Wheelbase: 2,850 mm (112.2 in)
- Length: 4,890 mm (192.5 in)
- Width: 1,920 mm (75.6 in)
- Height: 1,695–1,705 mm (66.7–67.1 in)
- Curb weight: 1,870–2,160 kg (4,123–4,762 lb)

The fifth-generation RX was unveiled on 31 May 2022. Built on the GA-K platform, it is available in four models: RX 350, RX 350h, RX 450h+, and RX 500h F Sport Performance. The RX 500h model is equipped with Direct4 all-wheel drive system.

The fifth-generation RX maintains the same overall length as the former model, although the wheelbase has grown to 2,850 mm (112.2 in) (extended by 60 mm [2.4 in]) with the wider body at 1,920 mm (75.6 in) (widened by 25 mm [1.0 in]). The switch to the GA-K platform resulted in a lower weight by 90 kg (198.4 lb), and a lower center of gravity by 15 mm (0.6 in) as well as wider tracks. The newer platform, revised dimensions, and fitment of suspension components allow for larger interior space.

Unlike the previous generation, this vehicle comes with only five-passenger seating, no seven-passenger seating with the third row is offered. The three-row model from the previous generation called the RX L was replaced by the TX in 2023.

The front "spindle grille" found on most Lexuses was redesigned into a more three-dimensional mass, evolving into a design element Lexus calls "spindle body". The grille is smaller and less pointed than before. The A pillars have also been moved back to emphasize the elongated hood.

The front fenders are made of aluminum, while the B pillars are made of 2 GPa class hot-stamped steel, which is claimed as a world first in terms of both safety and weight reduction. The mounting points for the rear suspension and its member mounting points have been highly reinforced using short-pitch welding, laser screw welding, and structural adhesives, creating a rigid high-torsion rear body frame. For a more linear steering response, highly rigid die-cast aluminum is used for the steering support. Adaptive Variable Suspension (AVS) is standard on F Sport models.

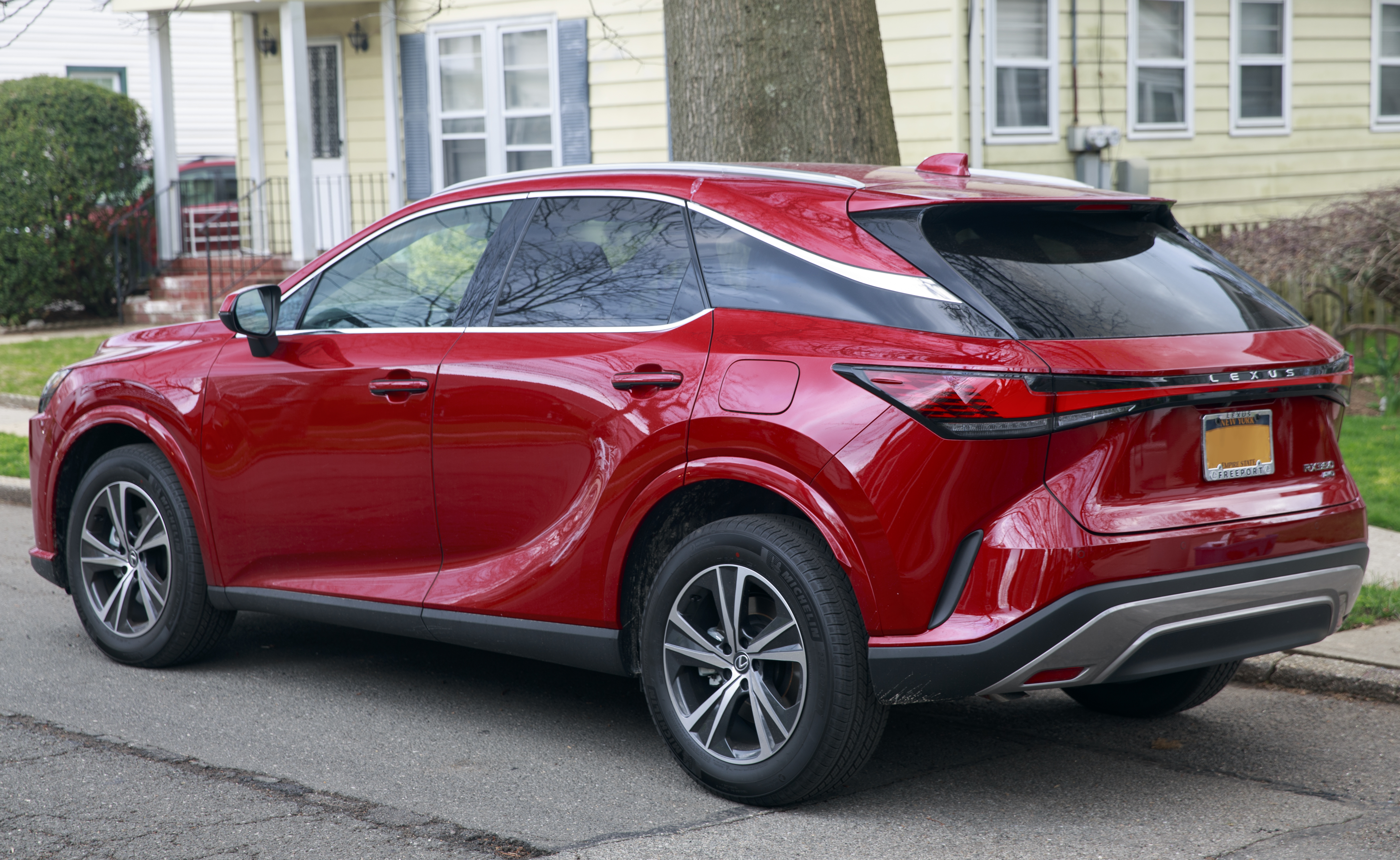
Rear view

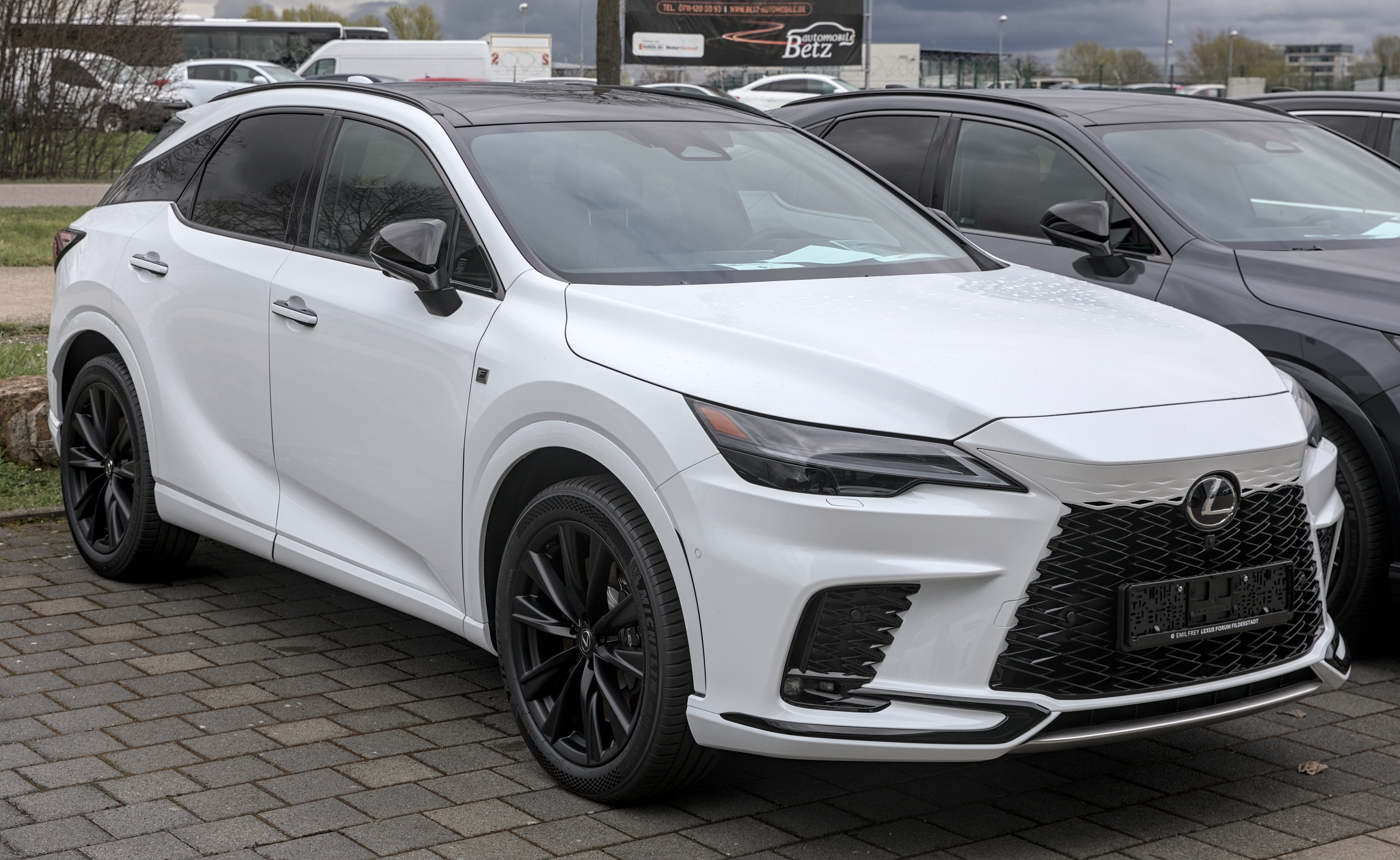
RX 500h F Sport Performance

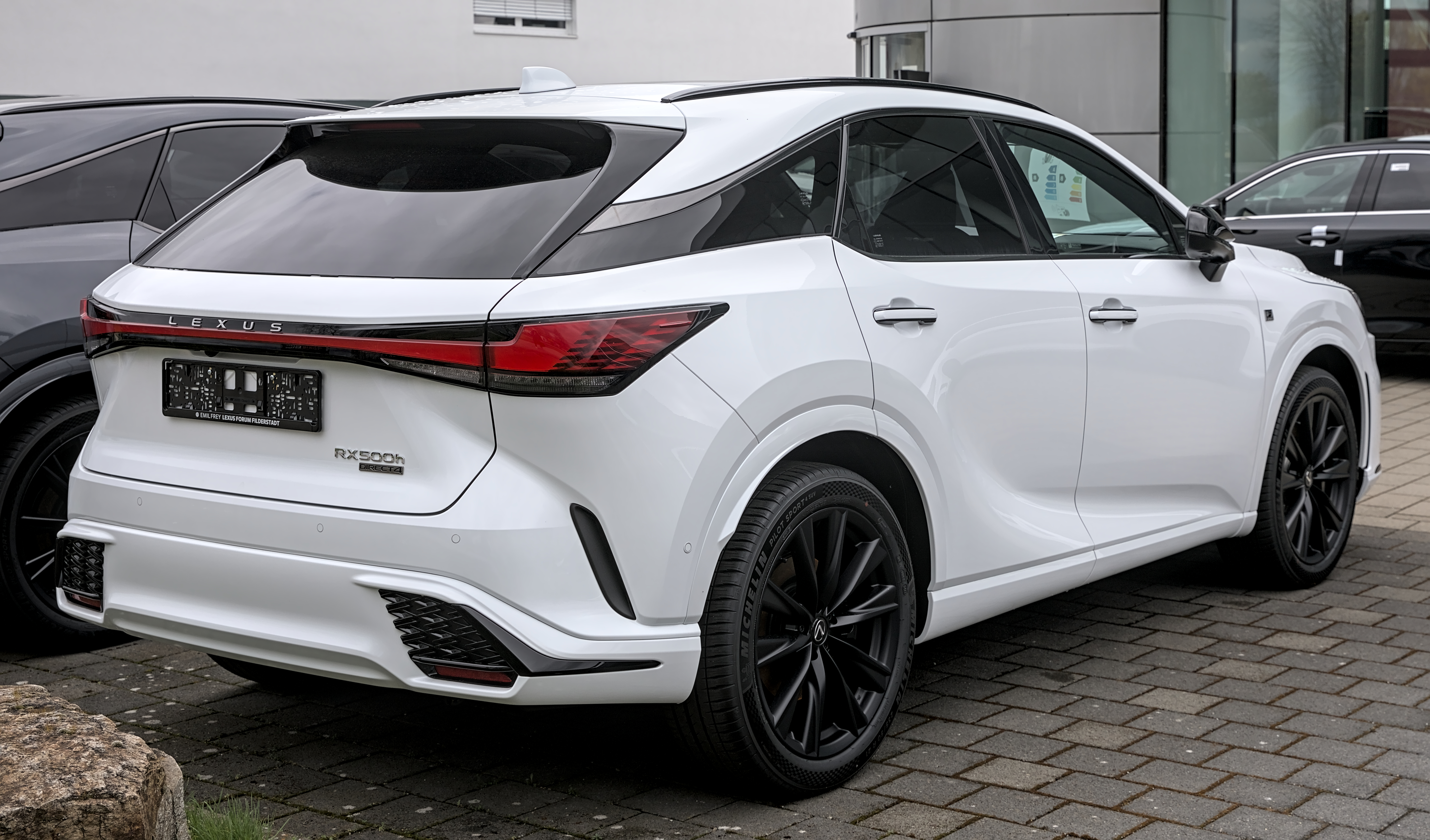
RX 500h F Sport Performance (rear view)

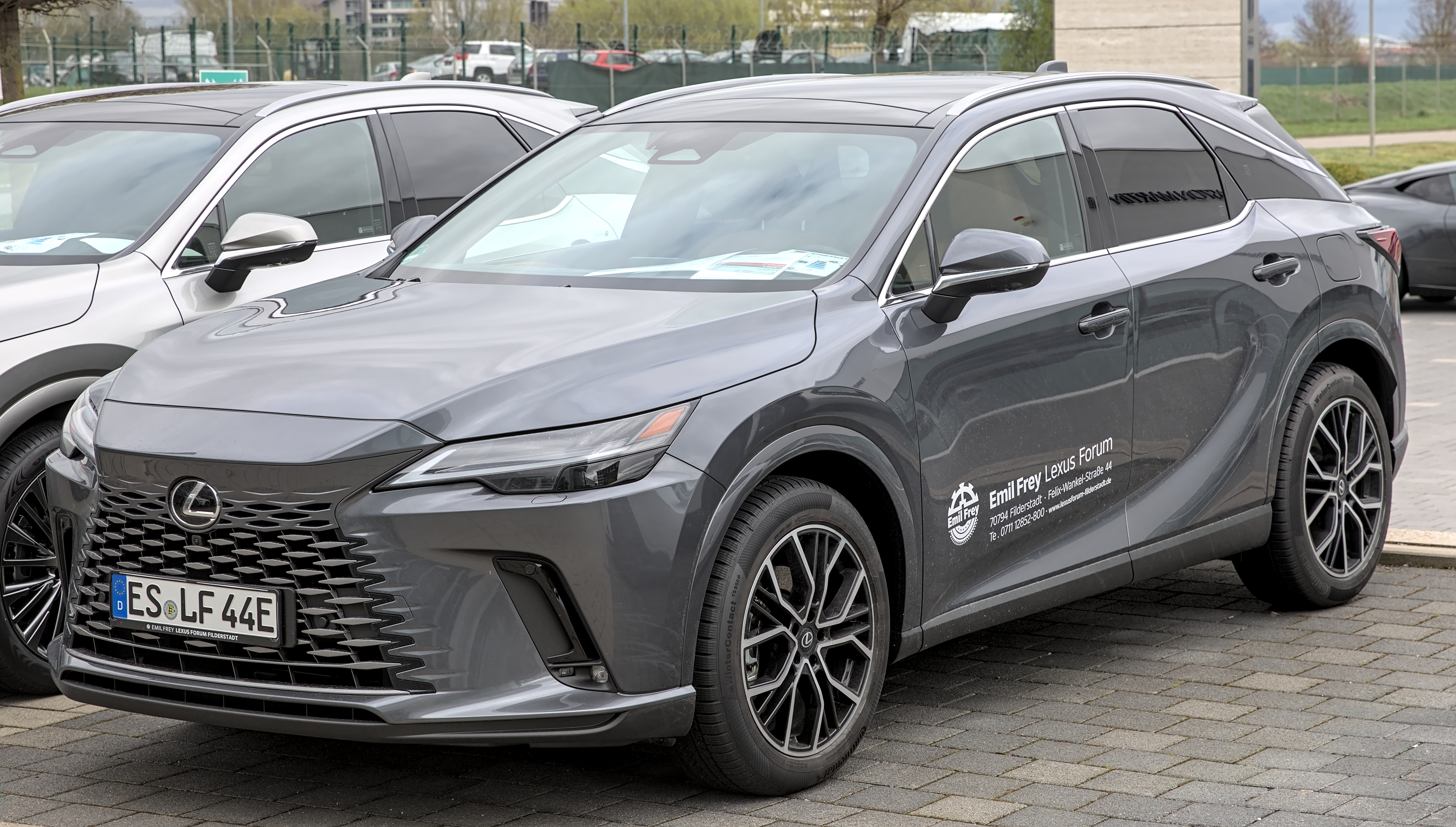
RX 450h+

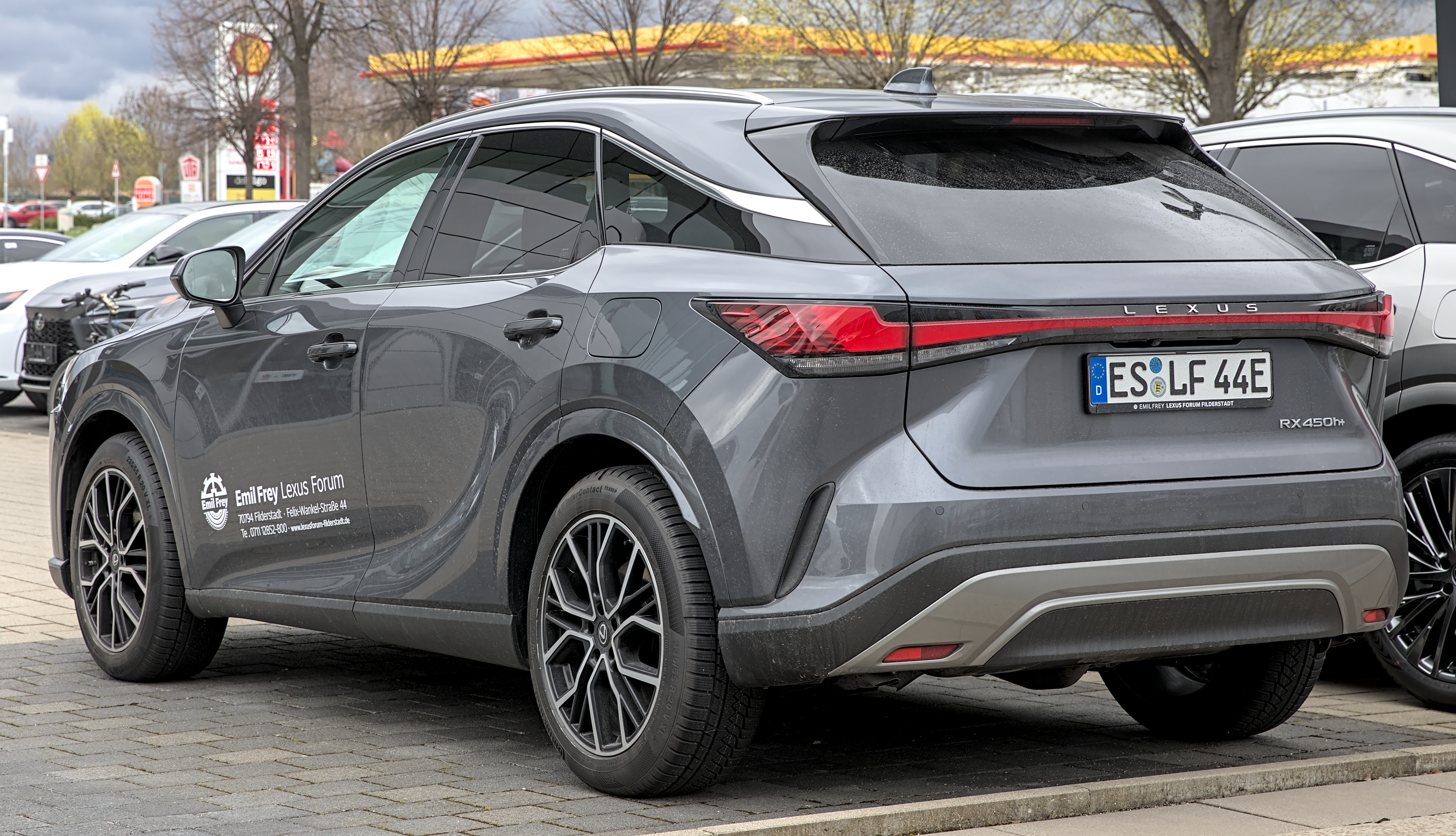
RX 450h+ (rear view)

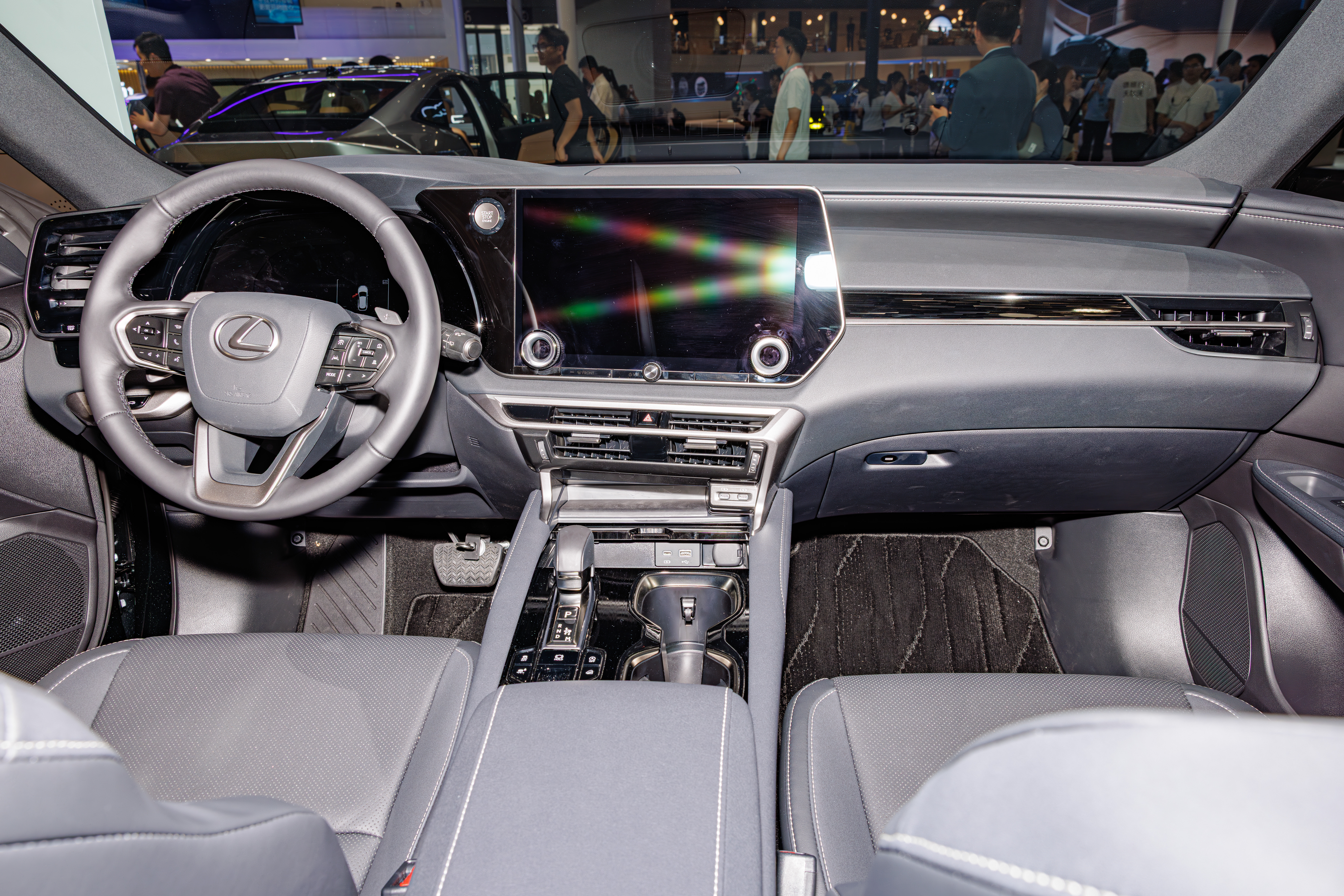
Interior

=== Powertrain ===
The fifth-generation RX is offered with four-cylinder engines from Toyota's Dynamic Force family, with the 3.5-liter V6 option dropped entirely.

Engines
Model Spec	RX 300 (China Only) 2.0 L S20A-FTS	RX 350 2.4 L T24A-FTS	RX 350h 2.5 L A25A-FXS	RX 450h+ 2.5 L A25A-FXS	RX 500h F Sport 2.4 L T24A-FTS
Power	182 kW (244 hp; 247 PS) at 6000 rpm	205 kW (275 hp; 279 PS) at 6000 rpm	183 kW (246 hp; 249 PS) at 6000 rpm	227 kW (304 hp; 308 PS) at 6000 rpm	273 kW (366 hp; 371 PS) at 6000 rpm
Torque	380 N⋅m (280 lb⋅ft) at 1800-4000 rpm	430 N⋅m (317 lbf⋅ft) at 1700-3600 rpm	315 N⋅m (232 lbf⋅ft) at 4600 rpm	270 N⋅m (199 lb⋅ft)	460 N⋅m (339 lb⋅ft) at 2000-3000 rpm
Top speed	180 km/h (112 mph)	200 km/h (124 mph)			209 km/h (130 mph)
Transmission	8-speed Direct Shift-8AT automatic		eCVT	eCVT	6-speed Direct Shift-6AT automatic
0–100 km/h (0–62 mph)	8.0 sec	7.6 sec	7.9 sec	6.5 sec	6.2 sec
Propulsion system	Gasoline		Power-split hybrid	Plug-in hybrid	Parallel hybrid
Hybrid battery	-		1.29 kWh nickel–metal hydride	18.1 kWh lithium-ion battery	1.44 kWh nickel–metal hydride
Layout	Front-engine, four-wheel drive	Front-engine, four-wheel drive or front-wheel drive	Front-engine, four-wheel drive using E-four or front-wheel drive		

=== Safety ===
ANCAP test results Lexus RX all variants (2022, aligned with Euro NCAP)
Test	Points	%
Overall:	5 /5 stars	
Adult occupant:	34.33	90%
Child occupant:	44	89%
Pedestrian:	48.17	89%
Safety assist:	14.90	93%

The 2023 RX was awarded "Top Safety Pick+" by IIHS.

IIHS scores
Small overlap front (Driver)	Good
Small overlap front (Passenger)	Good
Moderate overlap front (Original Test)	Good
Moderate overlap front (Updated Test)	Poor
Side (Updated Test)	Good
Headlights	Good
Front crash prevention (Vehicle-to-vehicle, Day)	Advanced
Front crash prevention (Vehicle-to-vehicle, Night)	Advanced
Child seat anchors (LATCH) ease of use	Good

Euro NCAP test results Lexus RX 450h+ Executive (2022)
Test	Points	%
Overall:	5 /5 stars	
Adult occupant:	34.3	90%
Child occupant:	43.0	87%
Pedestrian:	48.2	89%
Safety assist:	14.6	91%

TNCAP (1.0) test result Lexus RX 350 'Deluxe' (2025, similar to Euro NCAP 2017)
Test	Points	%
Overall:	5/5 stars	
Adult occupant:	35.952	94%
Child occupant:	44	89%
Pedestrian:	35.345	84%
Safety assist:	8.675	72%

== Sales ==
The success of the Lexus RX has been particularly strong in the United States, where it has been the best-selling luxury SUV since its introduction. As one of the earliest luxury crossovers on the market, the RX has inspired similar competitors from rival marques. The Lexus RX is the top selling Lexus hybrid, with global sales of 335,000 units through March 2016, out of one million Lexus hybrids delivered since 2005.

As of April 2015, Lexus had accumulated more than 2.1 million RX models worldwide. The Lexus RX 400h/RX 450h is the top selling Lexus hybrid, with global sales of 335,000 units through March 2016, out of one million Lexus hybrids sold worldwide.

Year	US sales Gasoline (Hybrid; PHEV)	Canada	Europe Gasoline (Hybrid; PHEV)	China	Indonesia Gasoline (Hybrid; PHEV)
1998	42,191				—
1999	73,498		65		—
2000	89,864		1,585		—
2001	77,426		6,161		—
2002	72,963		5,093		—
2003	92,366		7,386		—
2004	106,531	4,307	11,329		—
2005	108,775 (20,674)	4,857	11,279		—
2006	108,348 (20,161)	4,623	14,322		—
2007	103,340 (17,291)	4,665	13,909		3
2008	84,181 (15,200)	6,221	11,189		8
2009	93,379 (14,464)	8,828	10,451		135
2010	95,790 (15,113)	7,383	10,443		122
2011	82,595 (10,723)	6,760	6,771		287
2012	95,381 (12,223)	7,130	6,750		363 (5)
2013	103,920 (11,307)	7,789	5,707		372 (9)
2014	107,490 (9,351)	7,913	4,452		365 (2)
2015	100,610 (7,722)	7,063	3,248		163
2016	109,435 (8,561)	8,147	8,654		640
2017	108,307 (8,568)	9,402	7,661		977
2018	111,641 (15,656)	9,329	7,193		892
2019	111,036 (16,116)	8,827	6,805		872
2020	101,059 (14,411)	9,228	5,506	48,617	471
2021	115,320 (18,981)	10,331	5,347	49,255	666
2022	96,041 (17,194)	4,996	10,750 (6,440)		297
2023	114,033 (32,965; 656)		15,529 (6,744; 5,125)	25,717	170 (859; 99)
2024	118,636 (42,876; 4,248)		13,772 (6,215; 4,427)	32,118	— (713; 62) (Note: Gasoline-only models were discontinued in the Indonesian market, leaving an exclusively hybrid lineup for 2024 onward.)
2025	113,256 (43,259; 5,873)			33,452	— (251; 35)
