= Lexus ES =

Luxury car series produced by Lexus

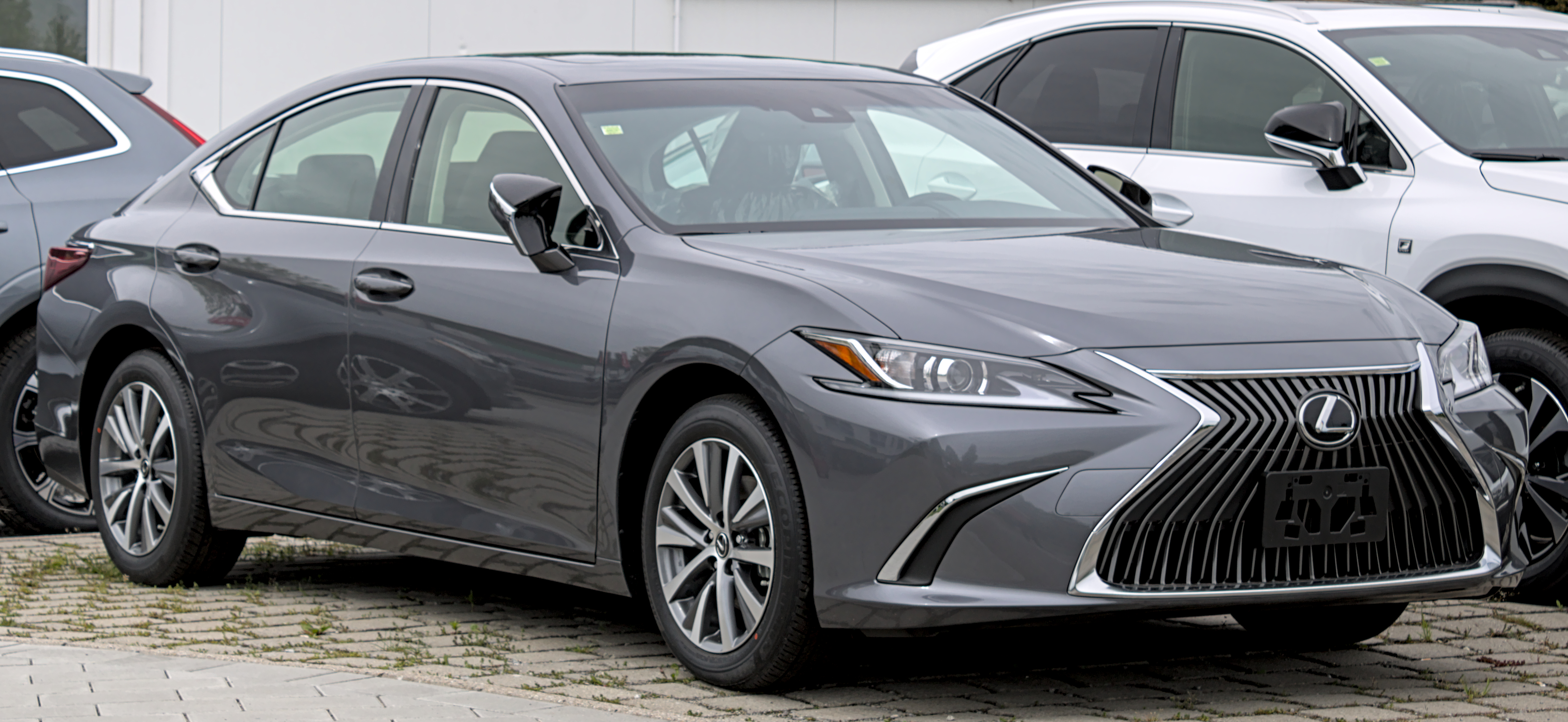
- Lexus ES 350 (GSZ10)

Overview
- Manufacturer: Toyota
- Also called: Toyota Camry Prominent/Vista (Japan; 1989–1991); Toyota Windom (Japan; 1991–2006)
- Production: June 1989 – present
- Model years: 1990–present

Body and chassis
- Class: Entry-level luxury car (D) (1989–1991); Mid-size luxury car (E) (1991–present)
- Body style: 4-door hardtop sedan (1989–2001); 4-door notchback sedan (2001–present)
- Layout: Front-engine, front-wheel-drive; Front-engine, four-wheel-drive (2020–present); Front-motor, front-wheel-drive (2025–present); Dual-motor, all-wheel-drive (2025–present)

The Lexus ES is a luxury sedan marketed since 1989 by Lexus, the luxury division of Toyota, across multiple generations, each offering V6 engines (except for the eighth generation) and a front-engine, front-wheel-drive layout (all-wheel drive is optional for latter generations). The first five generations of the ES used the Toyota Camry platform, while the latter generations are more closely related to both the Camry and the Avalon. Manual transmissions were offered until 1993, a lower-displacement inline-four engine became an option in Asian markets in 2010, and a gasoline-electric hybrid version was introduced in 2012. The battery electric version was later introduced in 2025. The ES was Lexus's only front-wheel drive vehicle until 1998, when the related RX was introduced, and the sedan occupied the entry-level luxury car segment of the Lexus lineup in North America and other regions until the debut of the IS in 1999. The ES name stands for "Executive Sedan". However, some Lexus importers use the name, "Elegant Sedan".

Introduced in 1989, the first generation ES 250 was one of two vehicles in Lexus's debut range, along with the LS 400. The second generation ES 300 debuted in 1991, followed by the third generation ES 300 in 1996, and the fourth generation ES 300/330 in 2001. The first- through fourth generation sedans shared body styling elements with Japan-market Toyota sedans, and a domestic market equivalent, the Toyota Windom (Japanese: トヨタ・ウィンダム, Toyota Windamu), was sold until the launch of the fifth generation ES in 2006. The word "Windom" is a combination of "win" and the suffix "dom" expresses a state of perpetual victory. The fifth generation ES used body styling marketed by Lexus as L-finesse and debuted in early 2006 as a 2007 model. The sixth generation ES debuted in the first half of 2012 as a 2013 model, and features increased cabin dimensions due to a longer wheelbase which is shared with the full-size XX40 series Avalon.

Lexus has positioned the ES in the comfort luxury segment, with an emphasis on interior amenities, quietness, and ride quality, in contrast with more firm-riding sport sedans. Buyers seeking more performance-focused models are targeted by the Lexus IS and rival makes, with such models offering a sportier drive with differently tuned suspensions. In Europe, Japan and other markets where it was not available until the seventh generation model, the GS sports sedan occupied the mid-size category in the Lexus lineup, until it was cancelled in August 2020. In the United States, the ES has been the best-selling Lexus sedan for over fifteen years.

== First generation (V20; 1989) ==
First generation
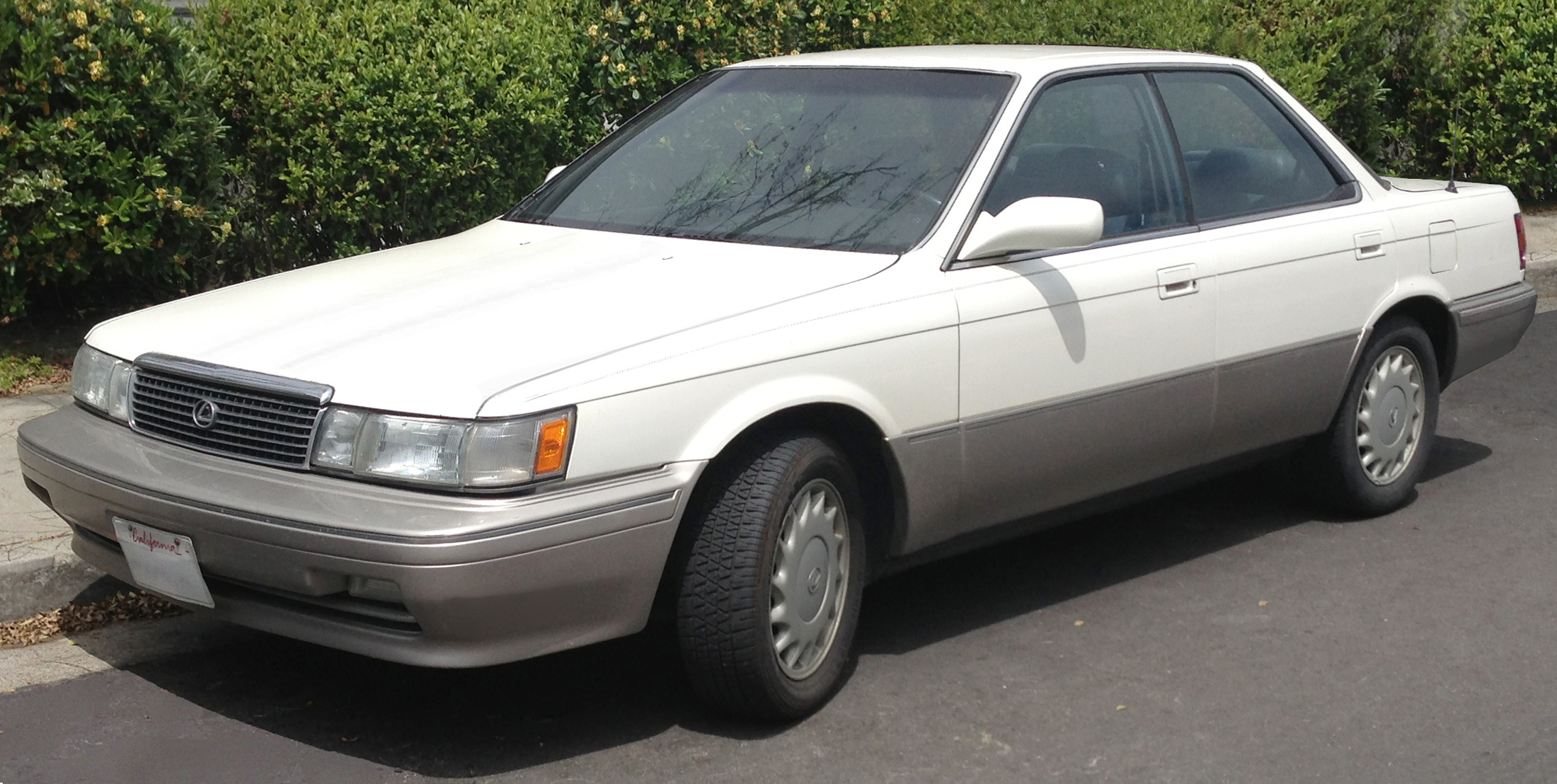

Overview
- Model code: V20
- Also called: Toyota Camry Prominent/Vista
- Production: June 1989 – July 1991
- Model years: 1990–1991
- Assembly: Japan: Toyota, Aichi (Tsutsumi plant)
- Designer: Yoshiro Tada (1987)

Body and chassis
- Body style: 4-door hardtop sedan
- Layout: Front-engine, front-wheel-drive

Powertrain
- Engine: Gasoline: 2.5 L 2VZ-FE V6
- Transmission: 5-speed manual; 4-speed A540E automatic

Dimensions
- Wheelbase: 2,601 mm (102.4 in)
- Length: 4,651 mm (183.1 in)
- Width: 1,699 mm (66.9 in)
- Height: 1,349 mm (53.1 in)

=== 1989–1991 ===
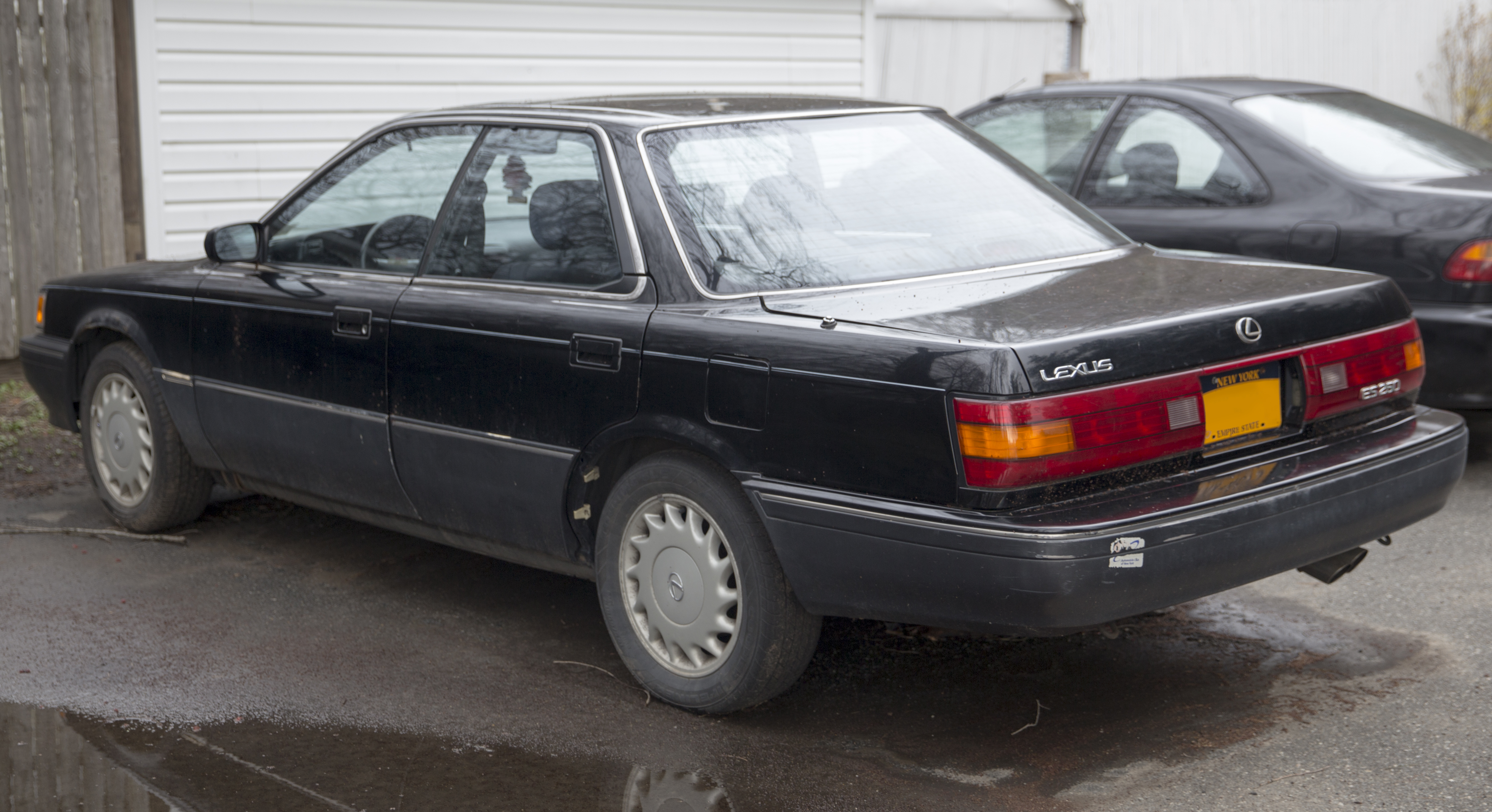
1990 Lexus ES250

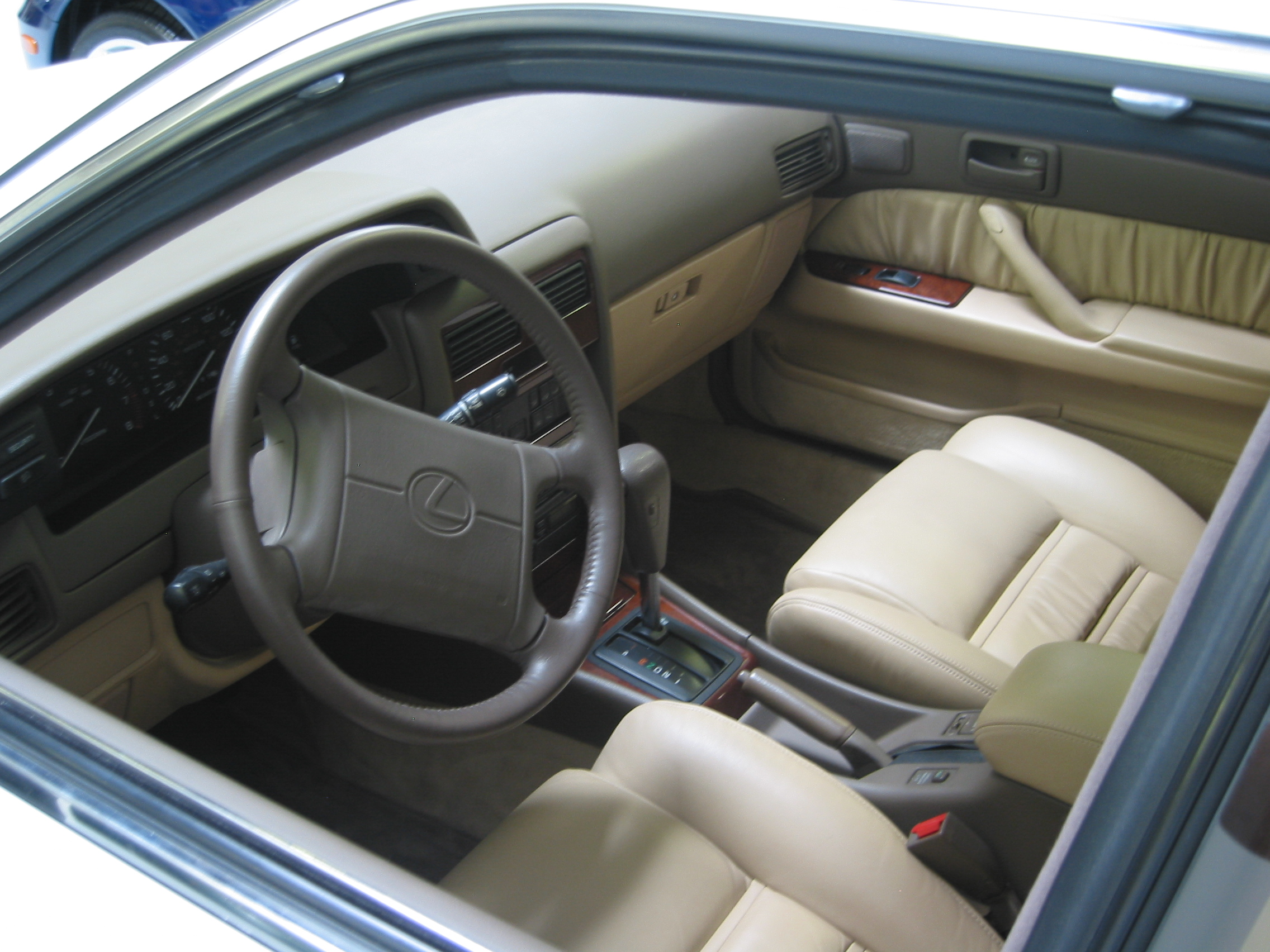
Interior

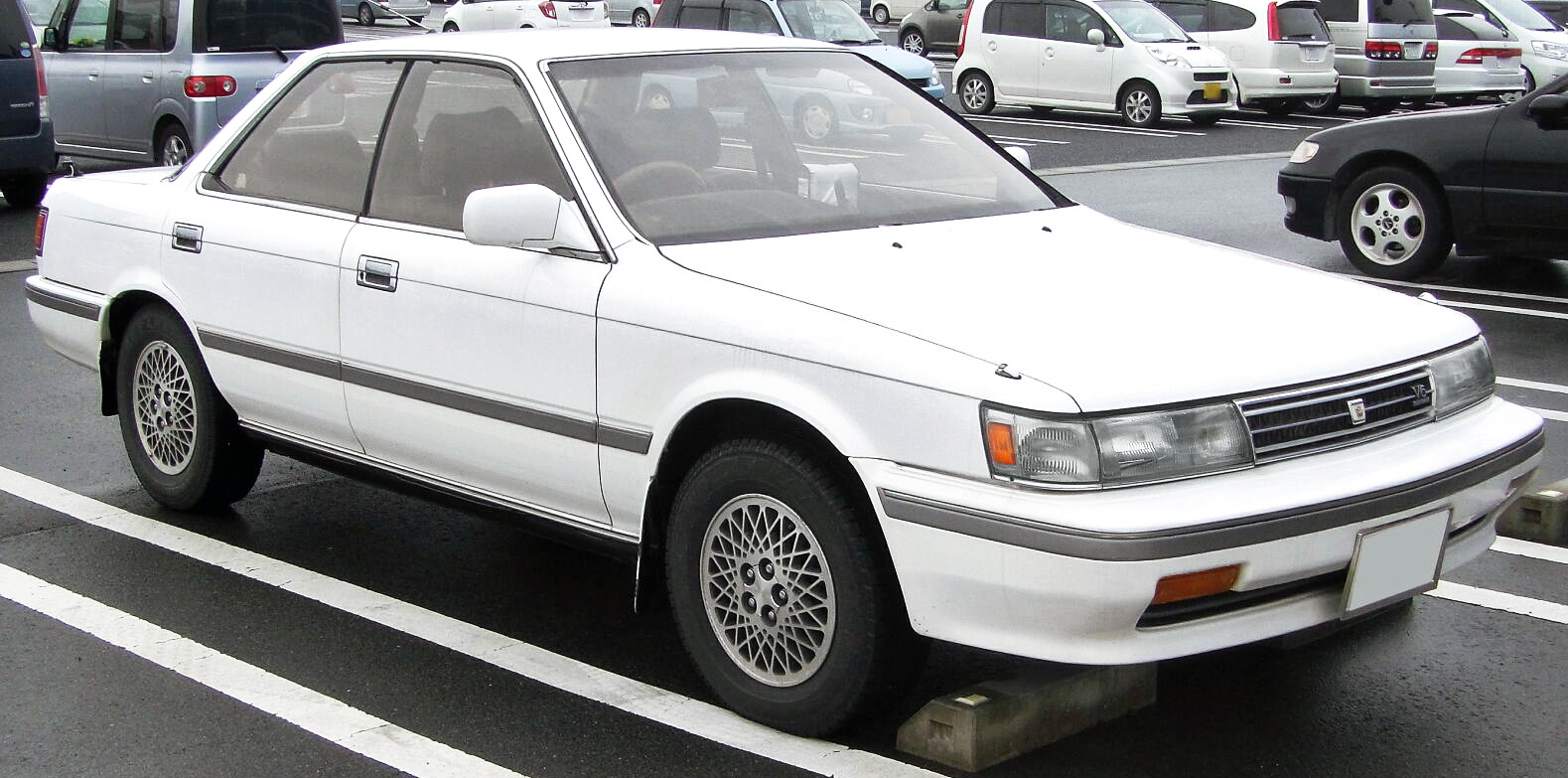
Toyota Camry Prominent (Japan)

The first generation ES (VZV21) debuted in January 1989 at the North American International Auto Show in Detroit as part of the launch of the Lexus division. In order to avoid introducing the nameplate with only one model, the LS 400, Lexus quickly developed the ES to debut alongside their flagship sedan. The smaller representative of the initial two-sedan Lexus lineup was designated the ES 250, and powered by the Camry's 2.5 L, 116 kW (156 hp) V6, which was aimed directly at the Acura Legend. The ES 250 was based on the Camry Prominent/Vista (V20). Design patents were filed on 17 November 1987, at the Japan Patent Office under the patent number 0666961-006 and registered on 8 August 1989.

On the exterior, the ES 250 shared the same general body style and overall dimensions as its Toyota counterparts, but had a more prominent grille, bigger tail lights, chrome trim, frameless windows, and distinct wheel design similar to its LS brethren. Inside the cabin, the ES 250 featured a six-speaker Pioneer sound system, genuine wood trim, one-touch power windows, and leather seats. A four-speed automatic or five-speed manual transmission was offered. The Electronically Controlled Automatic Transmission (ECT) featured "normal" and "power" modes.

Safety features included a driver's SRS airbag and anti-lock brakes. In typical specification, the ES 250 further included 15-inch alloy wheels, a power driver's seat, power moonroof, and CD player. Leather upholstery was common equipment, despite being listed as an option, while some ES 250s were also produced with cloth interiors.

In September 1989, the ES 250 and the flagship LS 400 went on sale in the United States. The ES 250 was marketed as the "luxury sedan of sports sedans," and carried a U.S. market suggested base price of approximately $22,000. During the first month of release, the ES 250 logged 1,216 units in sales. However, these numbers were eclipsed by the larger LS sedan, which unlike the ES was built on a unique and all-new platform. The original LS had been envisioned as a standalone model, but Lexus dealerships had asked for an additional vehicle to accompany its launch. Due to its similarities to the Camry, some viewed the ES 250 as a placeholder product of badge engineering and the vehicle ultimately did not sell as well as its larger counterpart. Initial perception of the ES led some to believe all the development time and research spent creating the larger LS showed that they overlooked one of the reasons the LS was developed, which was the 1986 Acura Legend, so it seems that the appearance of the LS was shrunk to fit the ES so as to compete with the Legend.

Production totaled 19,534 units in 1990 and 17,942 units in 1991, most for the automatic transmission model. Production commenced in June 1989 at Tsutsumi, with the first 1990 ES 250 rolling off the production line on 30 August 1989. Production ended on 5 July 1991. Because of its relatively brief production run, the ES 250 is a rare model on US roads today.

== Second generation (XV10; 1991) ==
Second generation
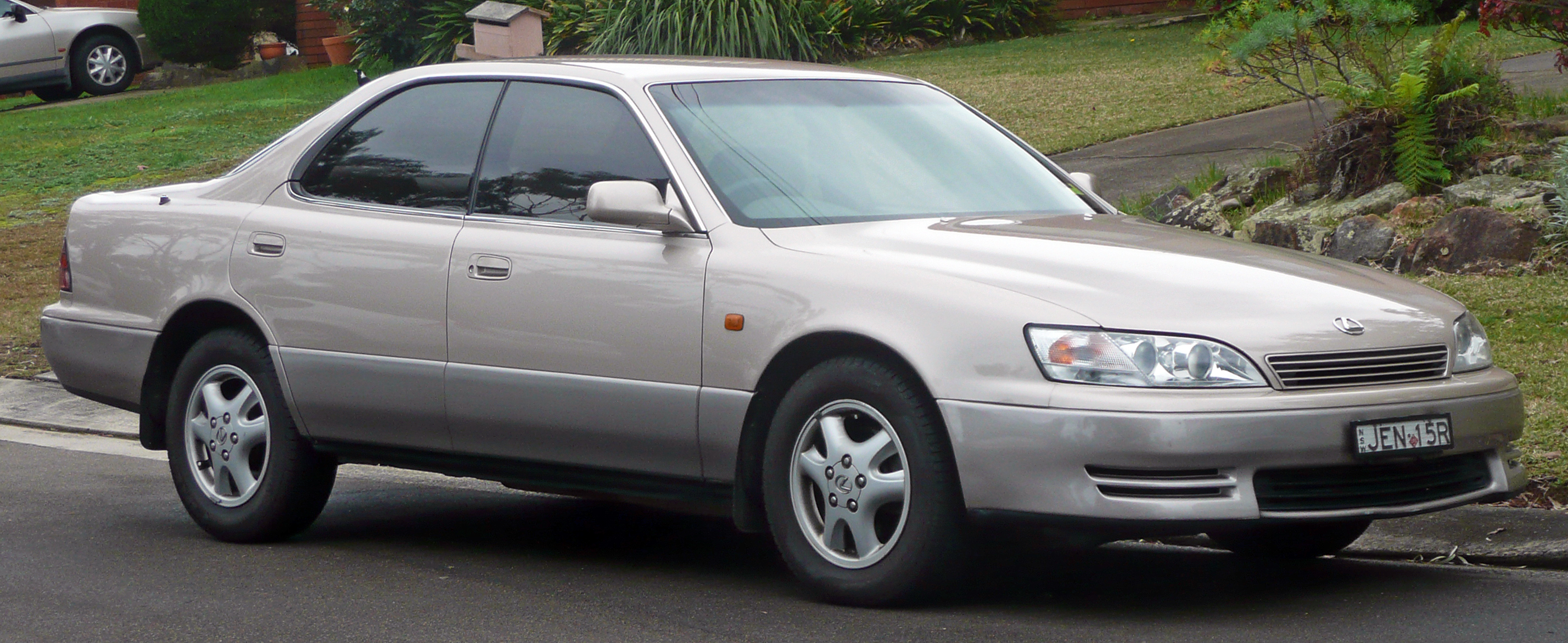
- 1991–1994 Lexus ES 300

Overview
- Model code: XV10
- Also called: Toyota Windom (Japan)
- Production: October 1991 – July 1996
- Model years: 1992–1996
- Assembly: Japan: Toyota, Aichi (Tsutsumi plant)
- Designer: Masanari Sakae (1988); Kunihiro Uchida (Chief: 1987–90); Kengo Matsumoto (1988)

Body and chassis
- Body style: 4-door hardtop sedan
- Layout: Front-engine, front-wheel-drive
- Related: Toyota Avalon (XX10); Toyota Camry (XV10)

Powertrain
- Engine: Gasoline: 2.5 L 4VZ-FE V6 (VCV11; Japan); 3.0 L 3VZ-FE V6 (VCV10); 3.0 L 1MZ-FE V6 (MCV10; N.America)
- Transmission: 5-speed manual (1992–1993); 4-speed A540E/A541E automatic (1992–1996)

Dimensions
- Wheelbase: 2,619 mm (103.1 in)
- Length: 4,770 mm (187.8 in)
- Width: 1,778 mm (70.0 in)
- Height: 1,369 mm (53.9 in)

=== 1991–1994 ===
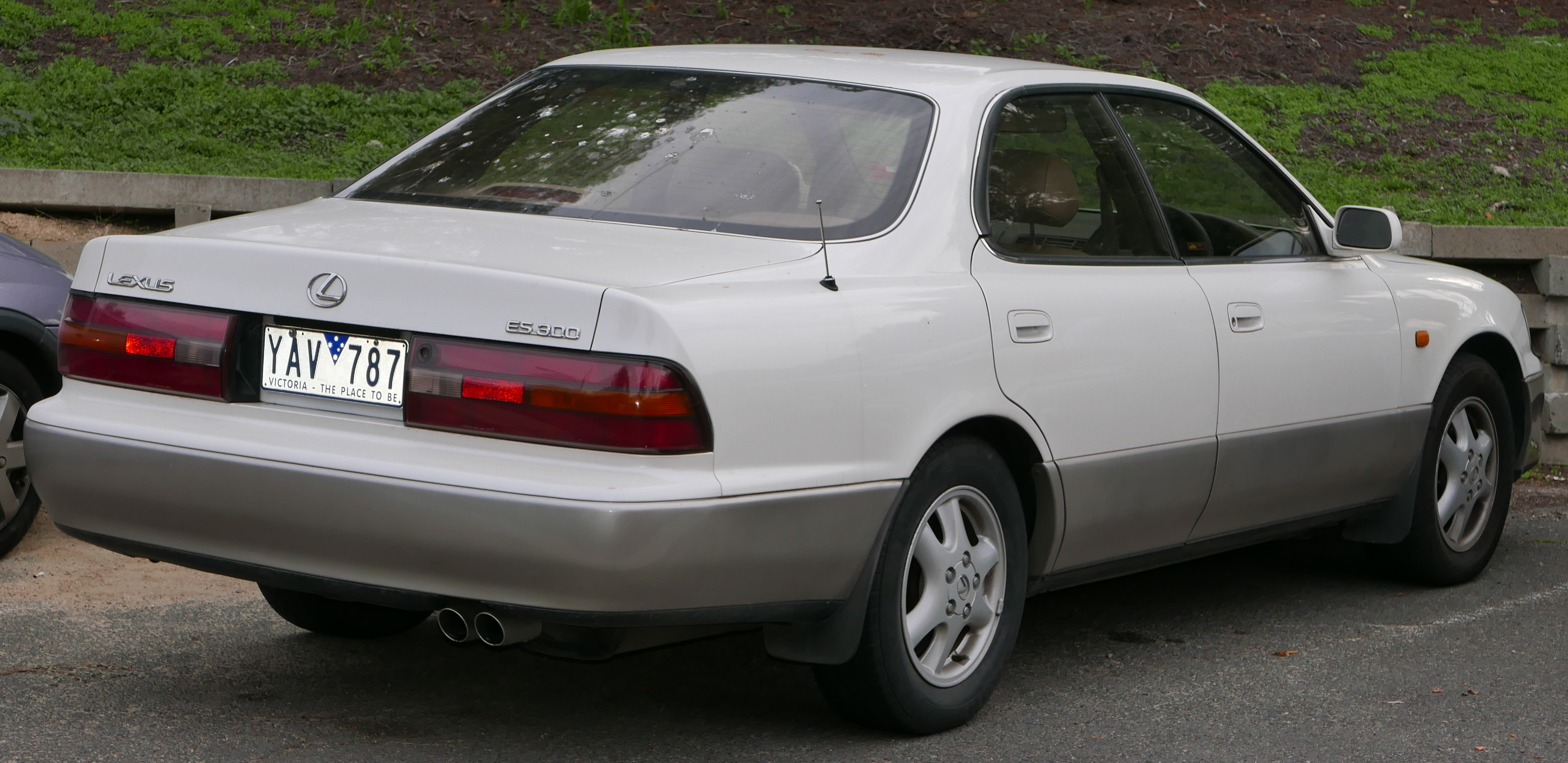
1991–1994 Lexus ES 300

In 1987, with creation of the Lexus brand, an entry level front-wheel Lexus model was ordered for development alongside the LS 400 and other offerings. In late 1988, a final design was chosen and design patents filed utilizing a clay 1:1 design model on February 3, 1989. In September 1991, for the 1992 model year, Lexus announced the second generation ES almost one year after the introduction of the second generation Acura Legend, but before Infiniti finally decided to add a similarly classed sedan, the J30. The second generation ES shared its design with the new generation Toyota Windom (XV10), which was officially announced in Japan on 30 September 1991, introduced at the October 1991 Tokyo Motor Show, and exclusive to Toyota Japan dealership sales channel called Toyota Corolla Store as the top level luxury sedan. The Windom itself shared elements with the latest generation of the Japan-market "narrow-body" V30 series Camry, and the "wide-body" Toyota Scepter but the Windom was offered as a pillared hardtop sedan while the Scepter was a conventional sedan.

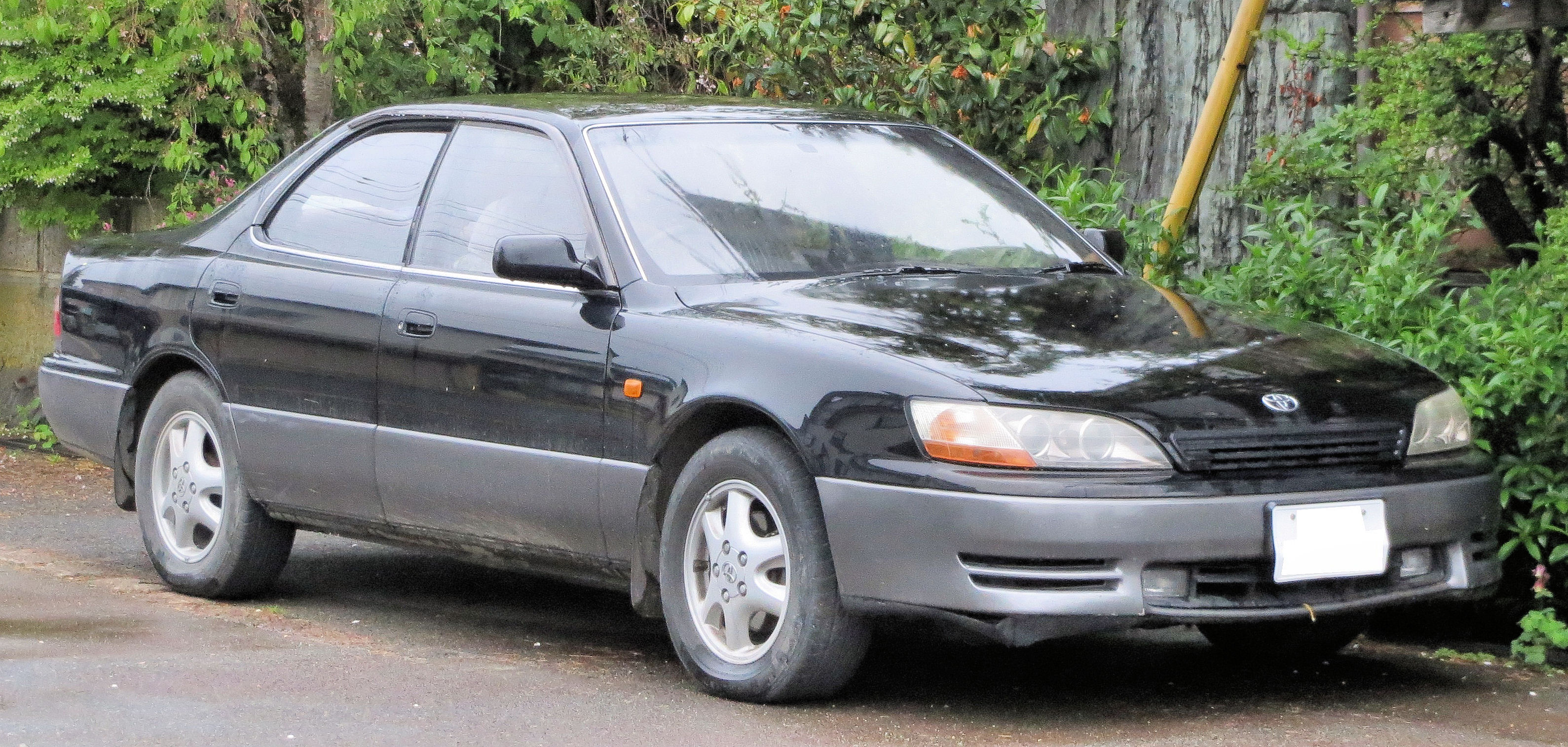
Toyota Windom 3.0G (Japan)

Completely redesigned and now sharing design features with the XV10 series Toyota Windom and styling cues with the LS 400, the model was renamed the ES 300 to reflect the half-liter increase in engine displacement to 3.0-liters. The second generation ES was significantly larger and more curvaceous than its predecessor, gaining 127 millimetres (5 in) in length and 76 millimetres (3 in) of width. On the front fascia, the ES gained projector headlamps in a curved housing and a three-slat grille with the Lexus emblem moved above on the hood. The side profile featured an invisible B-pillar and frameless-window doors. The rear deck lid featured an integrated spoiler effect similar to the flagship LS 400, improving the ES model's aerodynamics, now rated Cd=0.32.

Inside the cabin, the second generation ES featured California walnut trim on the center console, leather seats, an eight-speaker premium sound system, and keyless entry. The added wheelbase length and overall width made for increased legroom and shoulder space than the previous model. Compared to its Camry relative, the ES 300 featured separate styling, a different suspension setup with front and rear independent MacPherson strut, and added weight amounting to 90 kg (200 lb). Much of this is due to increased dimensions, asphalt insulation in the body panels and additional on-board equipment. As with its predecessor, anti-lock brakes were standard.

The ES 300 sported a 138 kW (185 hp) 3.0-liter 3VZ-FE V6 engine and had an advertised 0–97 km/h (0–60 mph) time of 7.9 seconds. In Japan, where the ES was badged as the Toyota Windom, a 2.5-liter 4VZ-FE version producing 128 kW (172 hp) was made available in October 1993. Lexus offered a standard five-speed E53 manual transmission and optional four-speed A540/1E automatic.

Production assembly of the ES 300 commenced on 9 September 1991, and the sedan went on sale later that year in the U.S. as a 1992 model. The sedan was not released in Europe, where similar Toyota models were offered. The second generation ES was a major sales success, becoming Lexus' best-selling vehicle overall. In its first full year of sales, the ES logged 39,652 units, and throughout the following years of its production run, sales reached near or above that figure. Although the initial US base price was $26,550, this increased to over $30,000 in later years. By 1994, in part because of the rising yen and high demand, the manufacturer's suggested retail price had increased to $31,200, 19.3 percent more than the original 1992 figure. In 1993, a passenger airbag was added as standard equipment.

=== 1994–1996 ===
Minor updates were introduced in 1994 for the 1995 model year (August 1994 production), including: a revised grille insert (now with a three-slot grille, replacing the previous four-slot version), new headlights and fog lights, outside air temp readout, and CFC-free air conditioning. In North America, the 1994 update introduced the new all-aluminum 1MZ-FE engine with 140 kW (188 hp). This change in engine resulted in a change in model code for the car (now known as the MCV10 series). Other markets retained the 3VZ-FE engine (and thus retained the VCV10 model code).

In September 1995 for the 1996 model year, Lexus offered an ES 300 "Coach Edition", featuring select Coach leather trim in the interior and a set of Coach luggage. Despite being its final year of sales, the 1996 ES 300 logged a 21 percent increase in sales over the previous year in the US, and 40,735 units were produced that year.

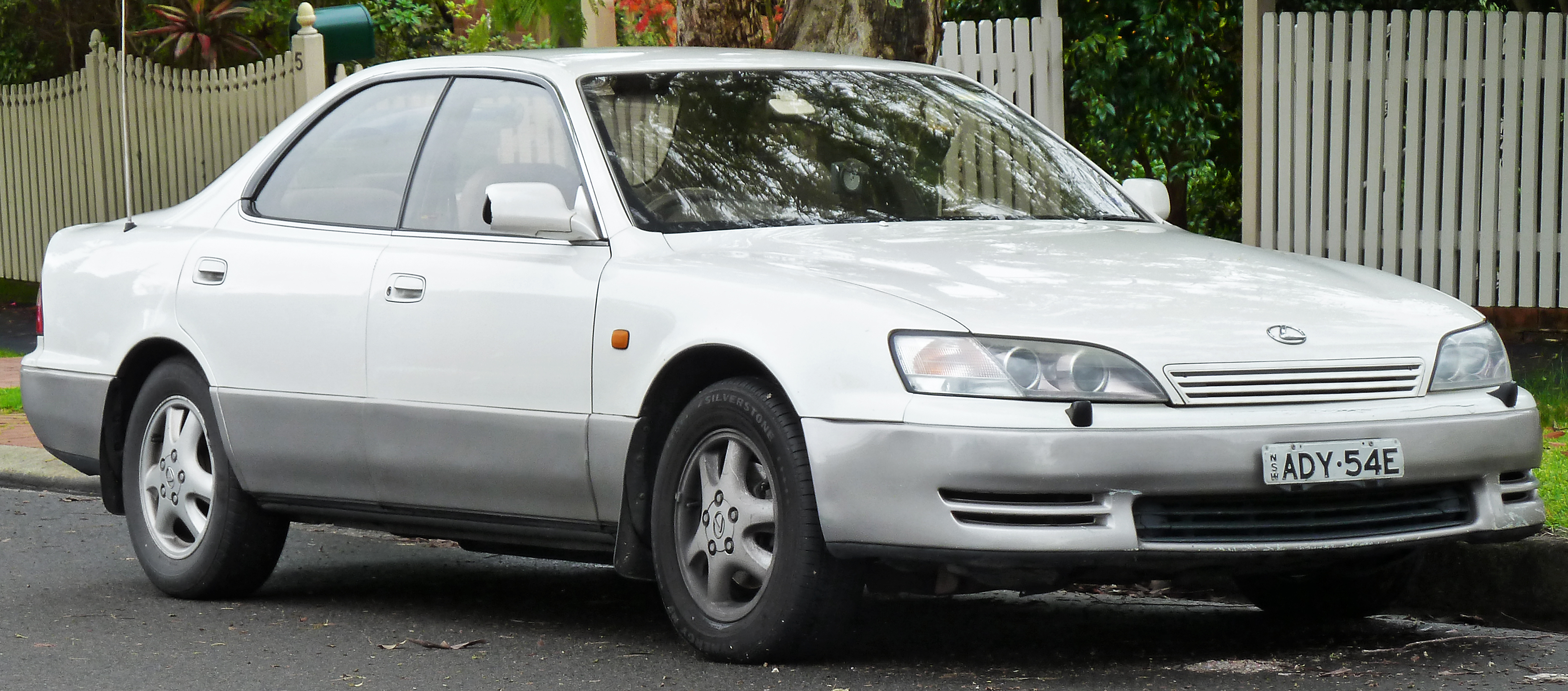
1994–1996 Lexus ES 300

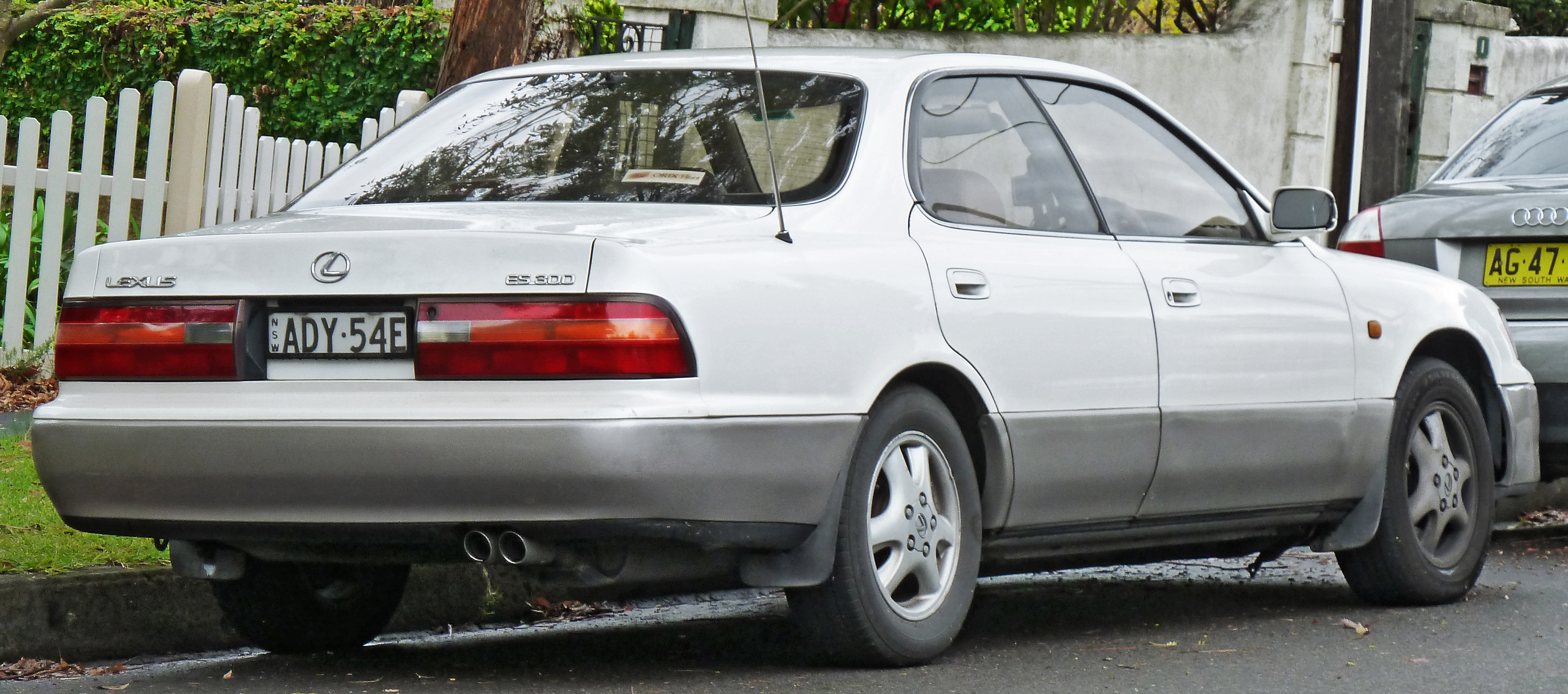
1994–1996 Lexus ES 300

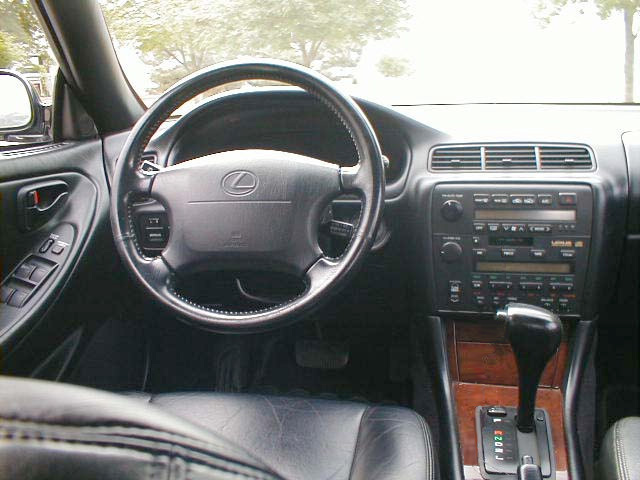
1995 Lexus ES 300 interior

== Third generation (XV20; 1996) ==
Third generation
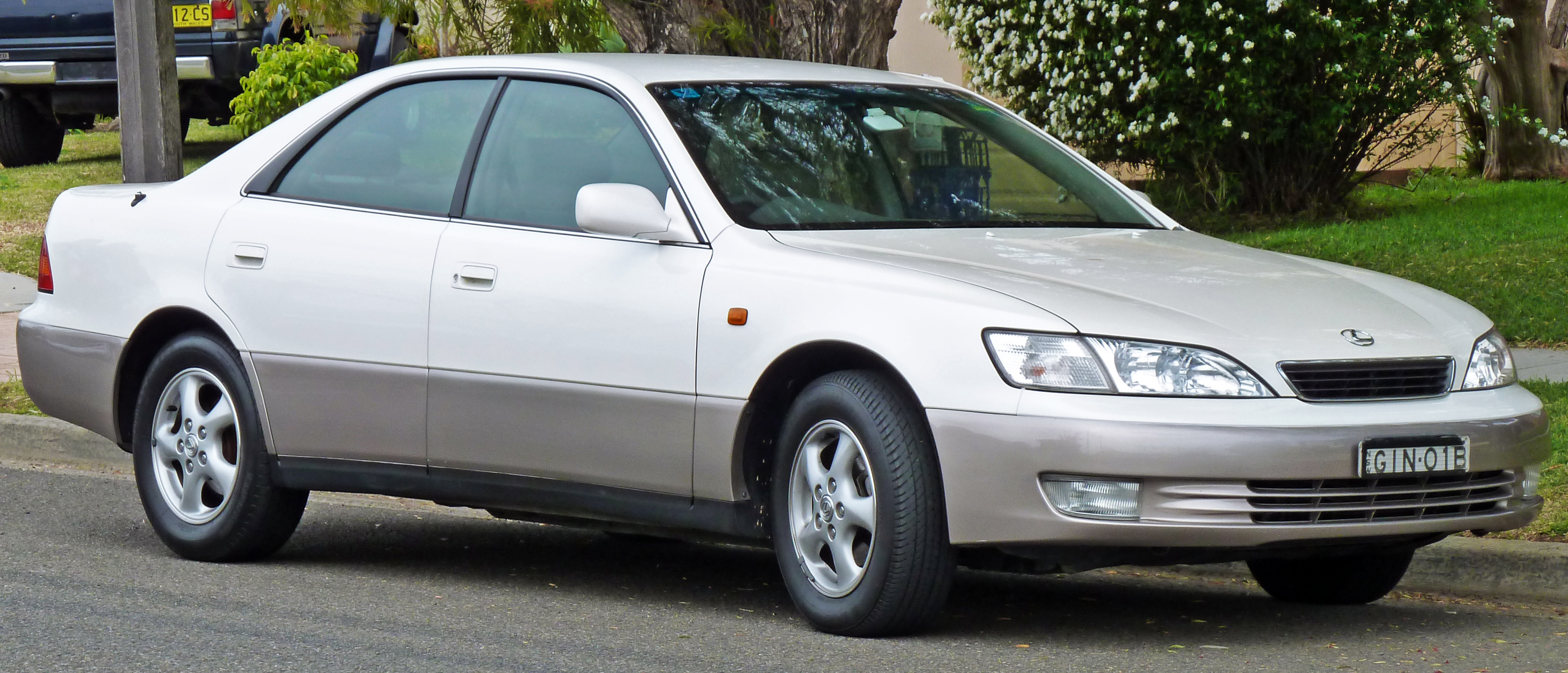

Overview
- Model code: XV20
- Also called: Toyota Windom (Japan)
- Production: August 1996 – July 2001
- Model years: 1997–2001
- Assembly: Japan: Toyota, Aichi (Tsutsumi plant); Japan: Miyawaka, Fukuoka (Toyota Motor Kyushu)
- Designer: Hiroshi Okamoto (1993)

Body and chassis
- Body style: 4-door hardtop sedan
- Layout: Front-engine, front-wheel-drive
- Related: Toyota Avalon (XX10); Toyota Camry (XV20); Toyota Camry Solara (XV20); Toyota Sienna (XL10); Lexus RX/Toyota Harrier (XU10)

Powertrain
- Engine: Gasoline: 2.5 L 2MZ-FE V6 (Japan); 3.0 L 1MZ-FE V6
- Transmission: (1996–1999) 4-speed A541E automatic; (1999–2001) 4-speed U140E automatic

Dimensions
- Wheelbase: 2,670 mm (105.1 in)
- Length: 4,831 mm (190.2 in)
- Width: 1,791 mm (70.5 in)
- Height: 1,394 mm (54.9 in)

=== 1996–1999 ===
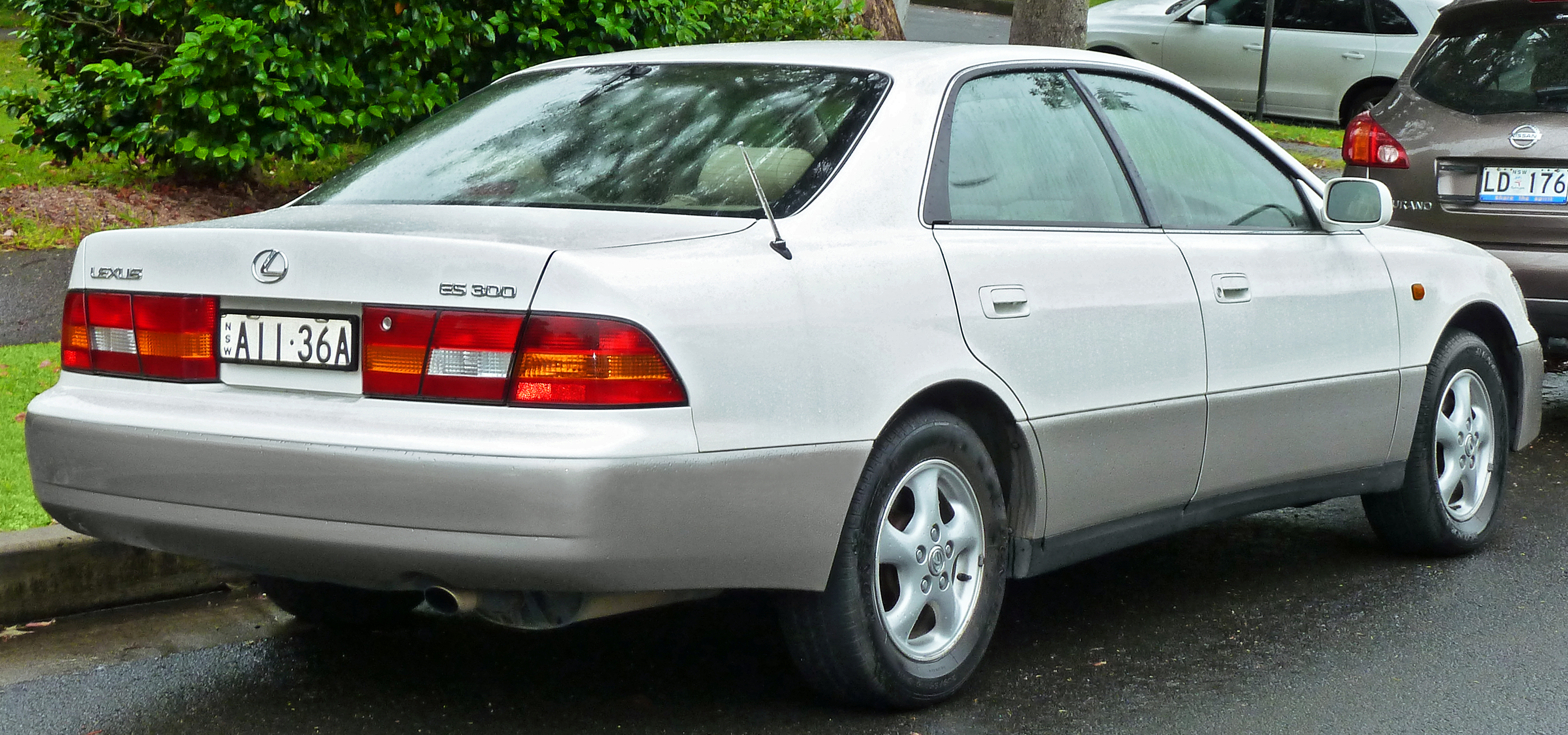
1996–1999 Lexus ES 300 (MCV20R) LXS sedan (Australia)

From 1992 to 1996, chief engineer Kosaku oversaw development of the XV20 Lexus variant alongside the XV20 series Camry programme under project code 416T. In mid-1993, an exterior design concept by Hiroshi Okamoto was approved and later frozen for production in January 1994, later being patented on 9 November 1994 at the Japanese patent office, under patent No. 0796802. The third generation ES (designated MCV20) premiered in September 1996 for the 1997 model year, featuring a design that was an evolution of the VCV10. The new cars featured a 30 percent stiffer body with a more rakish profile and sharper lines, reflector headlights (as opposed to projector headlights), and a more upscale-feeling interior. Introduced at a gala event on Rodeo Drive in Beverly Hills hosted by actress Sharon Stone, the ES 300 featured one powertrain option, a 3.0-liter V6 capable of 150 kW (200 hp) and 290 N⋅m (214 lb⋅ft) of torque and a four-speed automatic – although a 147 kW (197 hp), 2.5-liter 2MZ-FE V6 was also offered in the equivalent Japanese-market Windom. The ES 300 could go from 0–97 km/h (0–60 mph) in 7.7 seconds. The third generation ES was also slightly longer (overall length increased by 61.0-millimetre (2.4 in)) but weighed less than the previous model, and its drag coefficient was Cd=0.29, improved over its predecessor. For the first time, an Adaptive Variable Suspension, capable of adjusting individual wheels' dampers according to road conditions (within 0.0025 seconds), was offered.

Production commenced in August 1996 at the Tsutsumi plant in Toyota, Aichi, supplemented in May 1997 with Toyota Motor Kyushu's Miyata plant at Miyawaka, Fukuoka.

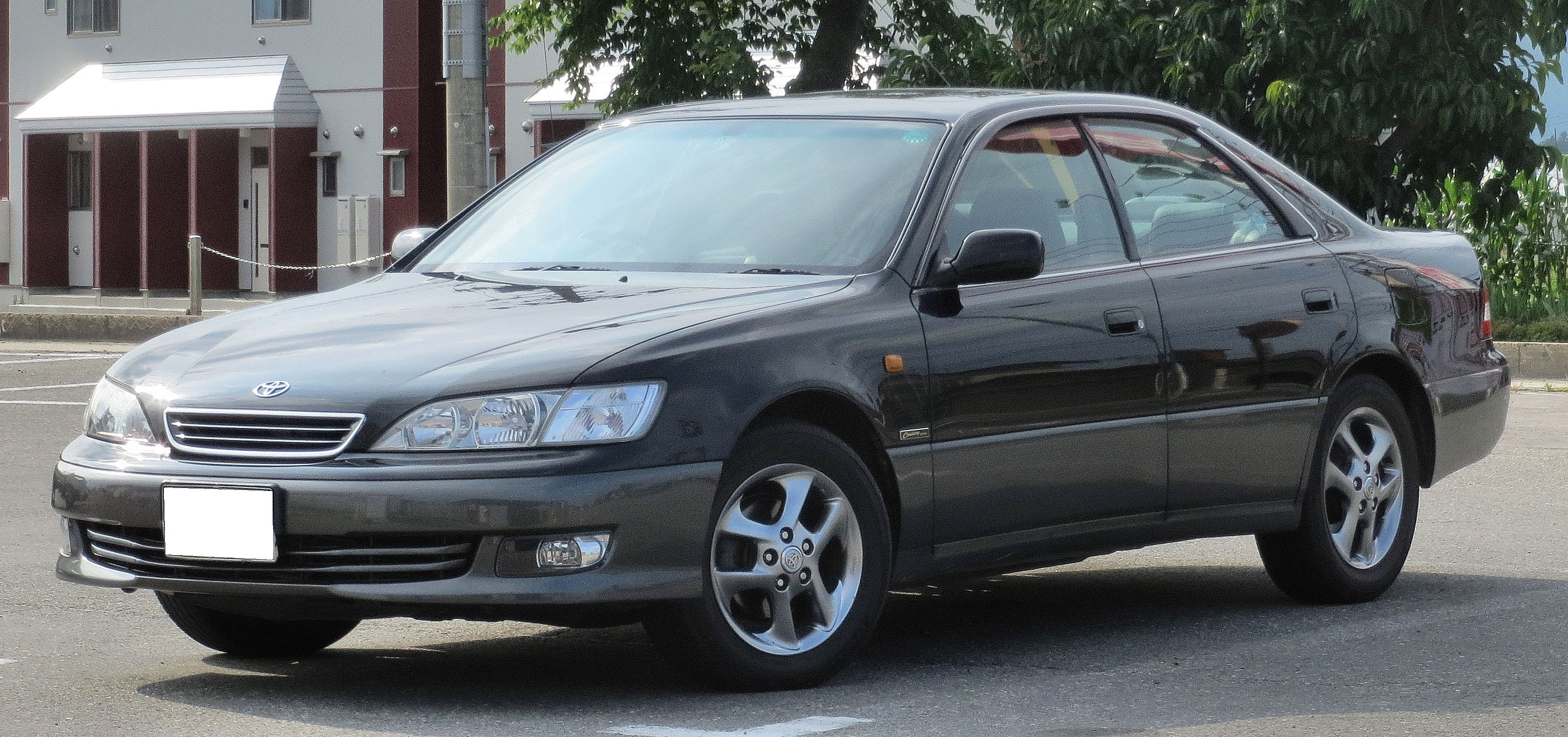
1999–2001 Toyota Windom (Japan)

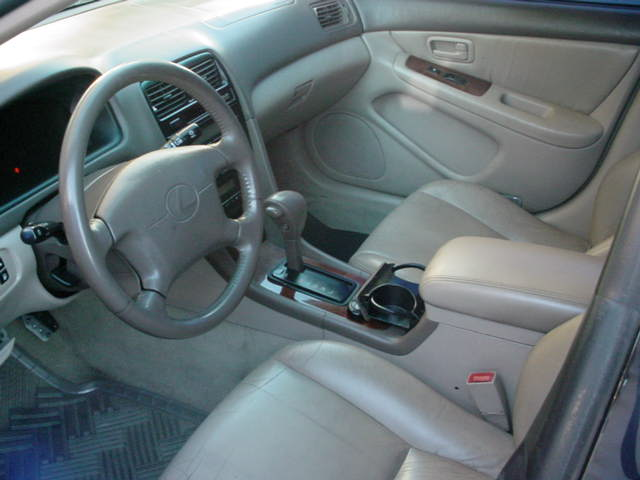
1997–1999 ES 300 interior (MCV20; US)

Inside the cabin, the ES 300 featured a new electroluminescent Lexus Optitron instrument panel, walnut trim, and leather seats. Other luxury standard features included heated outside mirrors and an automatic climate control system. A power moonroof, a 230 watt Nakamichi premium sound system with in-glove-box mounted six-disc CD changer, HID Headlights, Adaptive Variable Suspension and heated seats were options.

The U.S. base price of the 1997 ES 300 was $30,395. The third generation ES expanded upon the success of the previous generation model, reaching a record-setting 58,430 units in sales in its first year, and recording sales in the 35,000–50,000 range throughout its production run.

In 1997 for the 1998 model year, the ES received a few updates, mainly consisting of a revised supplemental restraint system (next generation), standard front row side-torso airbags, and force limiting seat belt pre-tensioners that were designed to tighten the front seat passengers into their seats upon impact. Transponder chips were now also used in the keys as to provide added protection from theft. The power rating grew to 157 kW (210 hp) in 1998 (1999 model year) due to the new 1MZ-FE engine with variable valve timing (VVT-i).

The Lexus IS was introduced to European markets in 1999 and became the luxury marque's entry-level model; by this time the ES was no longer sold in most European markets. Recent versions of the ES were sold in North America, Asia, and Australia.

There was a widespread engine oil gelling issue which could block oil from parts of the engine. After a US class action lawsuit, Toyota notified US owners that engines would be overhauled or replaced for free if damaged by the buildup of gelled oil.

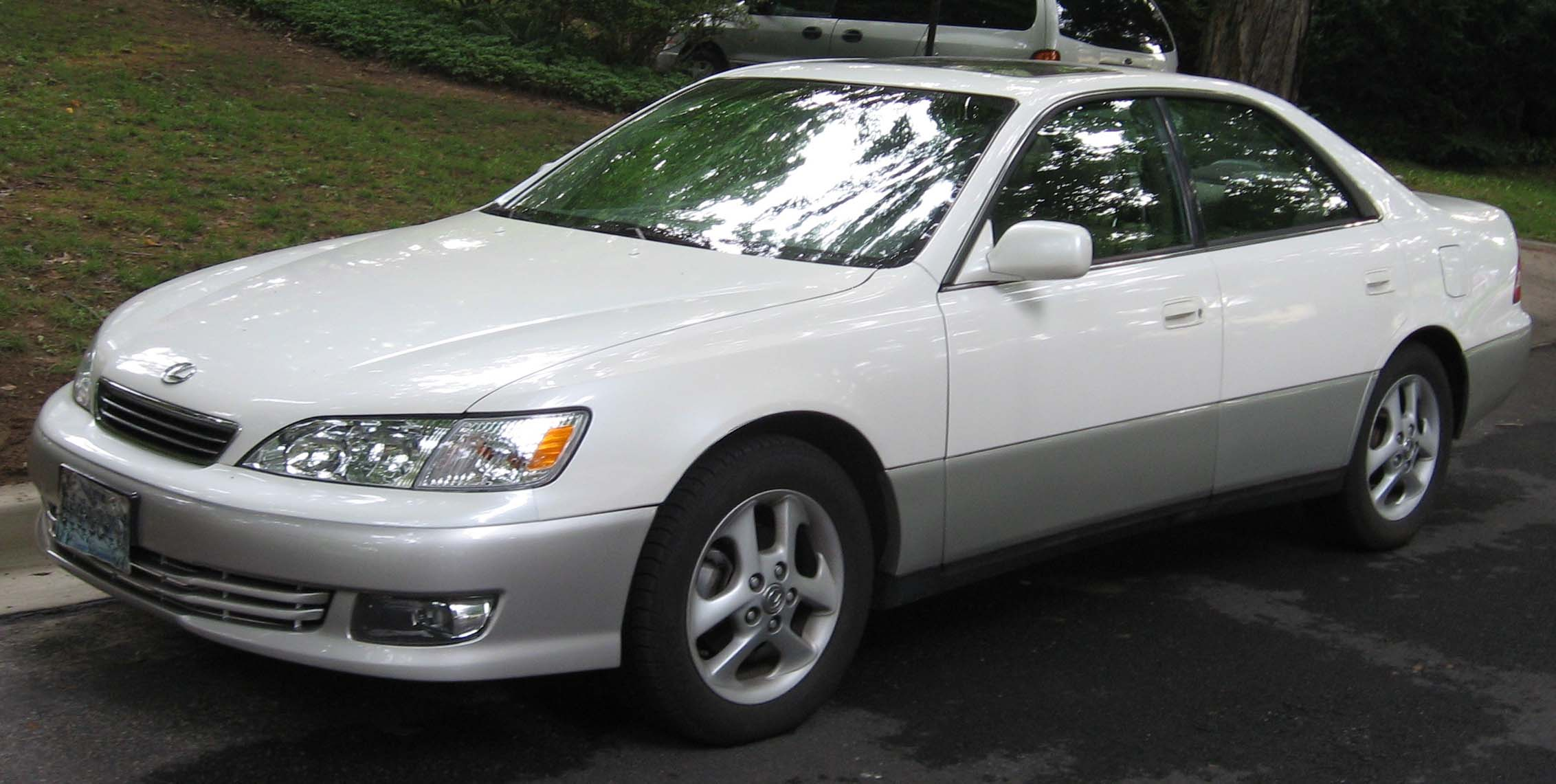
MY2000–2001 Lexus ES 300 (MCV20; US)

=== 1999–2001 ===
The ES 300 received a mild facelift in 1999 for the 2000 model year that consisted of new, clear tail lights and turn signals, a revised front end with a new grille, headlights, and lower bumper with clear fog lights and larger alloy wheels. Inside, the interior received an electrochromatic mirror, more wood trim and slight revisions to the audio system. Xenon High-Intensity Discharge headlights with auto-leveling were now optional. There was also a limited "Coach Edition" offered for the duration of the facelift model; in 1999 (for the 2000 model year), a "Platinum Edition" package was added, including power moonroof, unique interior trim, and custom alloy wheels.

== Fourth generation (XV30; 2001) ==
Fourth generation
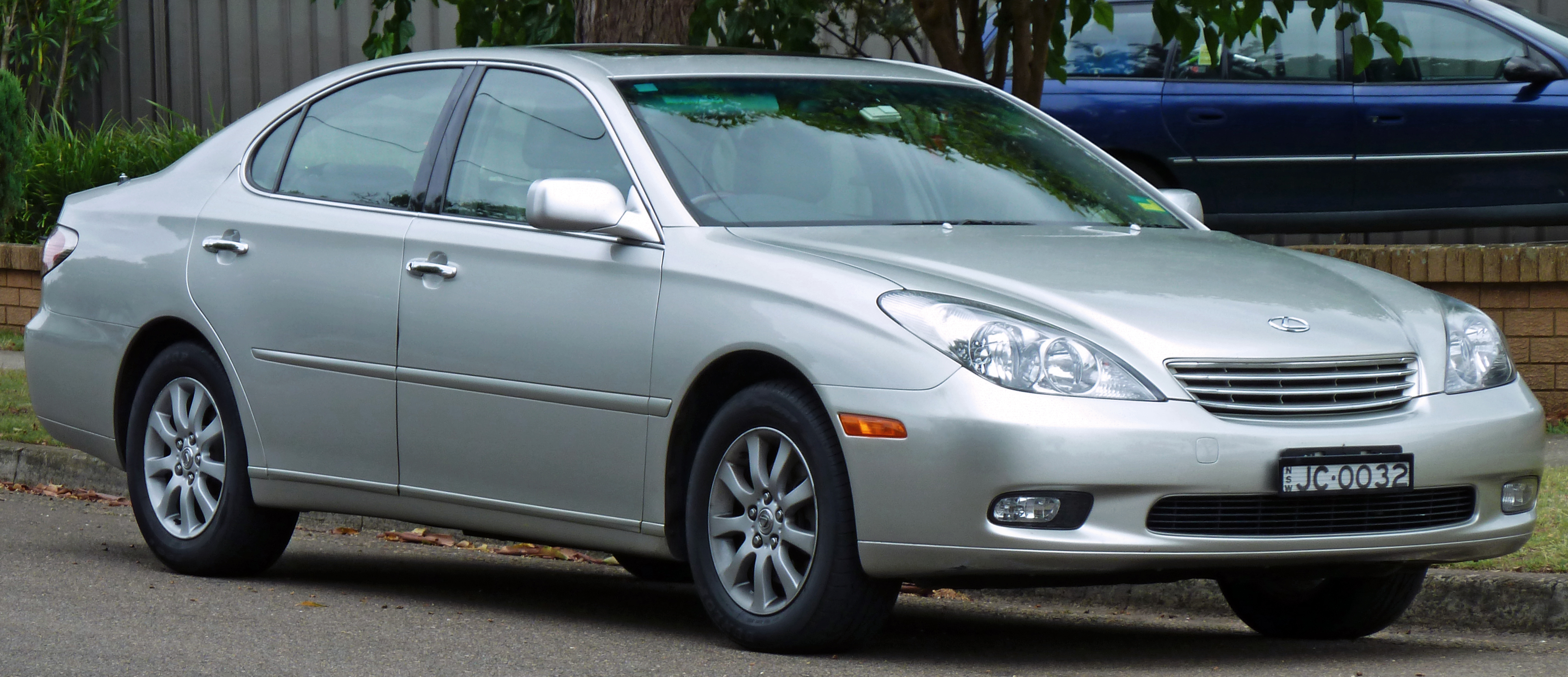

Overview
- Model code: XV30
- Also called: Toyota Windom (Japan)
- Production: July 2001 – February 2006
- Model years: 2002–2006
- Assembly: Japan: Miyawaka, Fukuoka (Toyota Motor Kyushu); Japan: Susono, Shizuoka (Kanto Auto Works); Japan: Toyota, Aichi (Tsutsumi plant)
- Designer: Kengo Matsumoto (1998)

Body and chassis
- Body style: 4-door sedan
- Layout: Front-engine, front-wheel-drive
- Platform: Toyota K platform
- Related: Toyota Avalon/Pronard (XX20); Toyota Camry (XV30); Toyota Camry Solara (XV30); Lexus RX/Toyota Harrier (XU30)

Powertrain
- Engine: Gasoline: 3.0 L 1MZ-FE V6; 3.3 L 3MZ-FE V6 (MCV31; N.America)
- Transmission: 5-speed U151E automatic

Dimensions
- Wheelbase: 2,720 mm (107.1 in)
- Length: 4,854 mm (191.1 in)
- Width: 1,811 mm (71.3 in)
- Height: 1,455 mm (57.3 in)

Chronology
- Successor: Toyota Sai/Lexus HS (Windom)

=== 2001–2003 ===
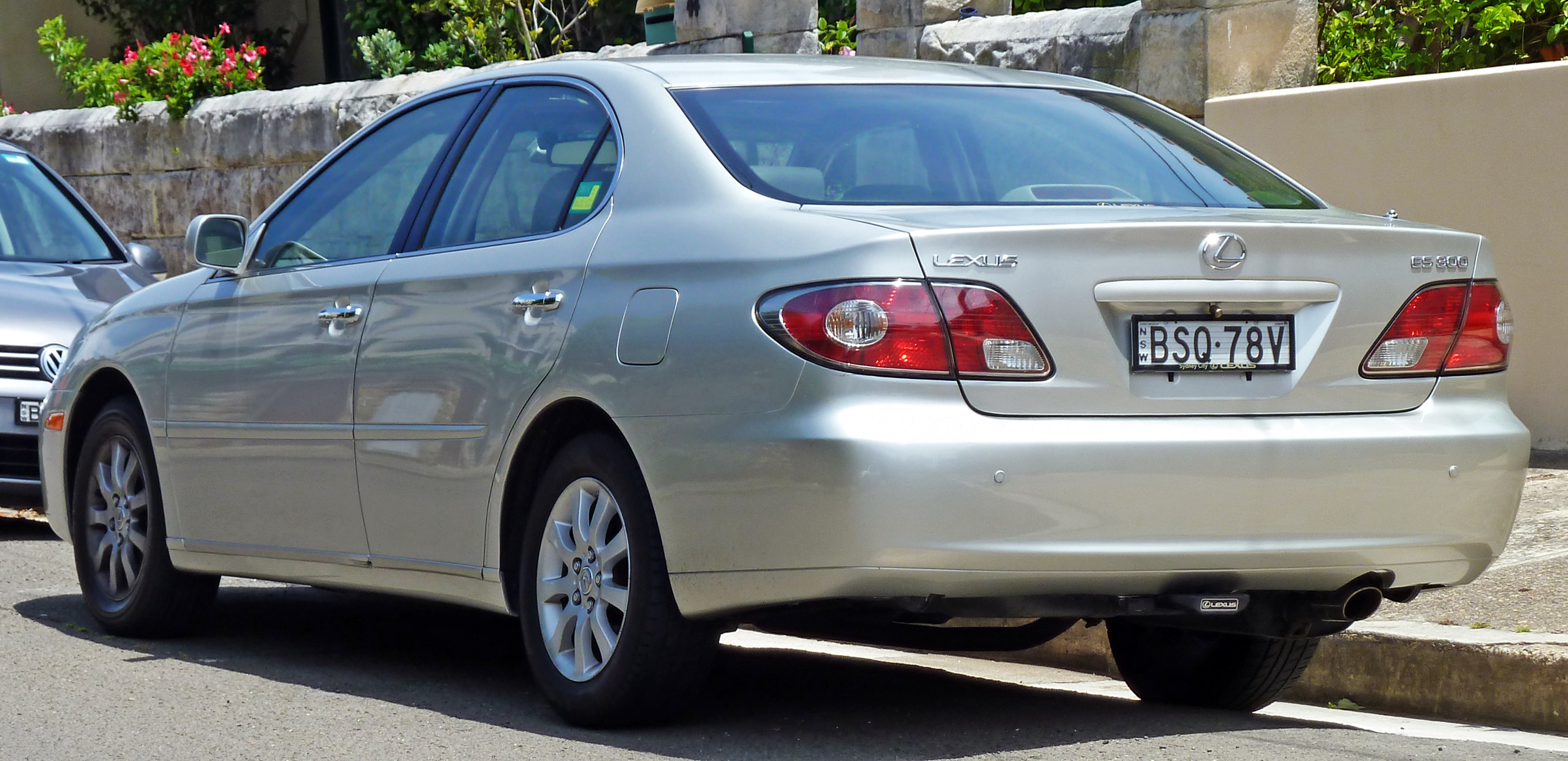
Lexus ES 300 (MCV30; pre-facelift, Australia)

As development on the XV30 series Camry began in 1997, development of the XV30 ES commenced under chief engineer Kosaku Yamada, with styling being done through 1998 under design chief Makoto Oshima. In December 1998, a concept design by Kengo Matsumoto was approved and frozen for production in June 1999. Design patents were filed on 8 March 2000 at the Japan Patent Office and registered under patent No. 1098805. The larger, fourth generation ES (designated MCV30) debuted in July 2001 for the 2002 model year, one year after the Lexus IS became Lexus' entry-level car. The presence of the IS in the Lexus lineup enabled the company to give the new ES 300 a more upscale image and luxury feel by excising the sporting pretensions of the previous ES models. The more aerodynamic shape had a drag coefficient of Cd=0.28. In Japan, the MCV30 Windom received a 2-star LEV rating.

Production occurred between July 2001 and September 2004 at the Tsutsumi plant in Toyota, Aichi, supplemented until December 2002 with Toyota Motor Kyushu's Miyata plant. The Toyota-badged Windom version was launched in Japan in August 2001. In January 2003, production started at the Higashi Fuji plant at Susono, Shizuoka, lasting until the XV30 ended production in February 2006.

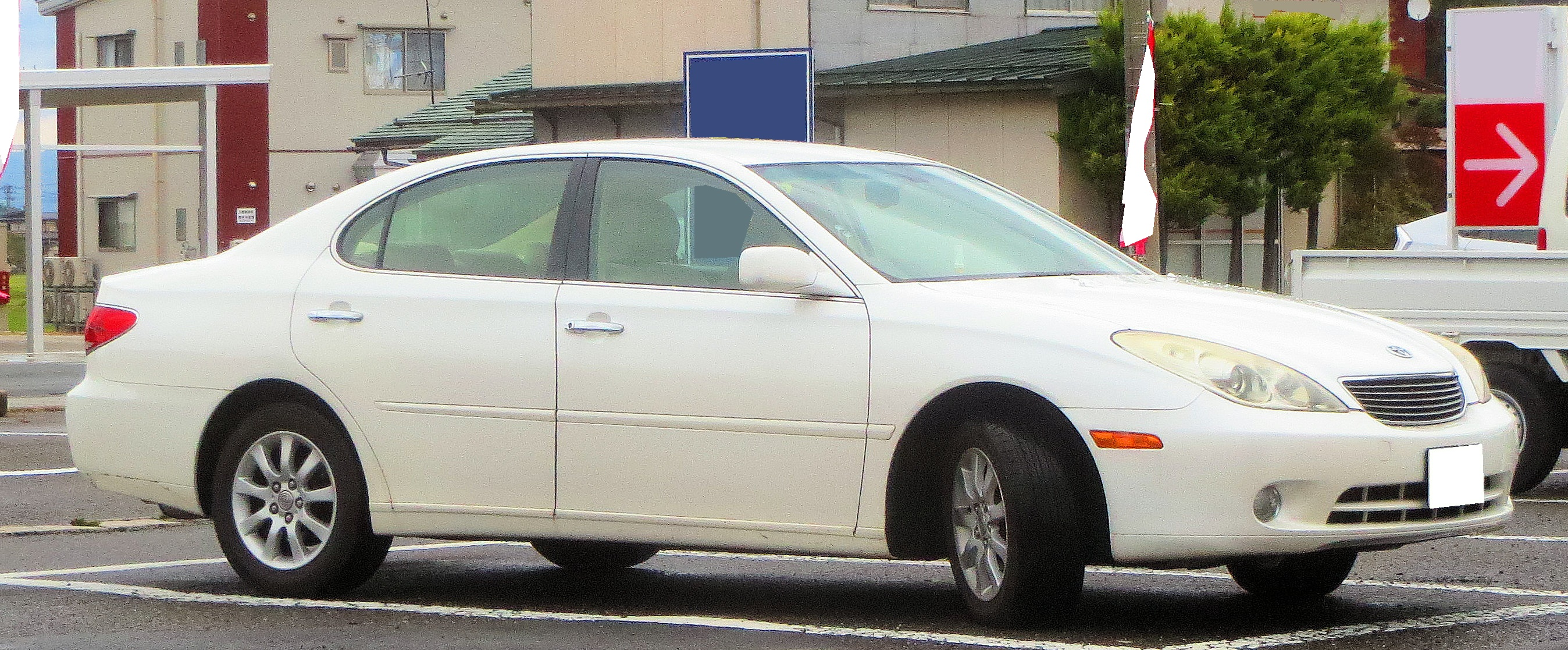
2001–2003 Toyota Windom 3.0G (Japan)

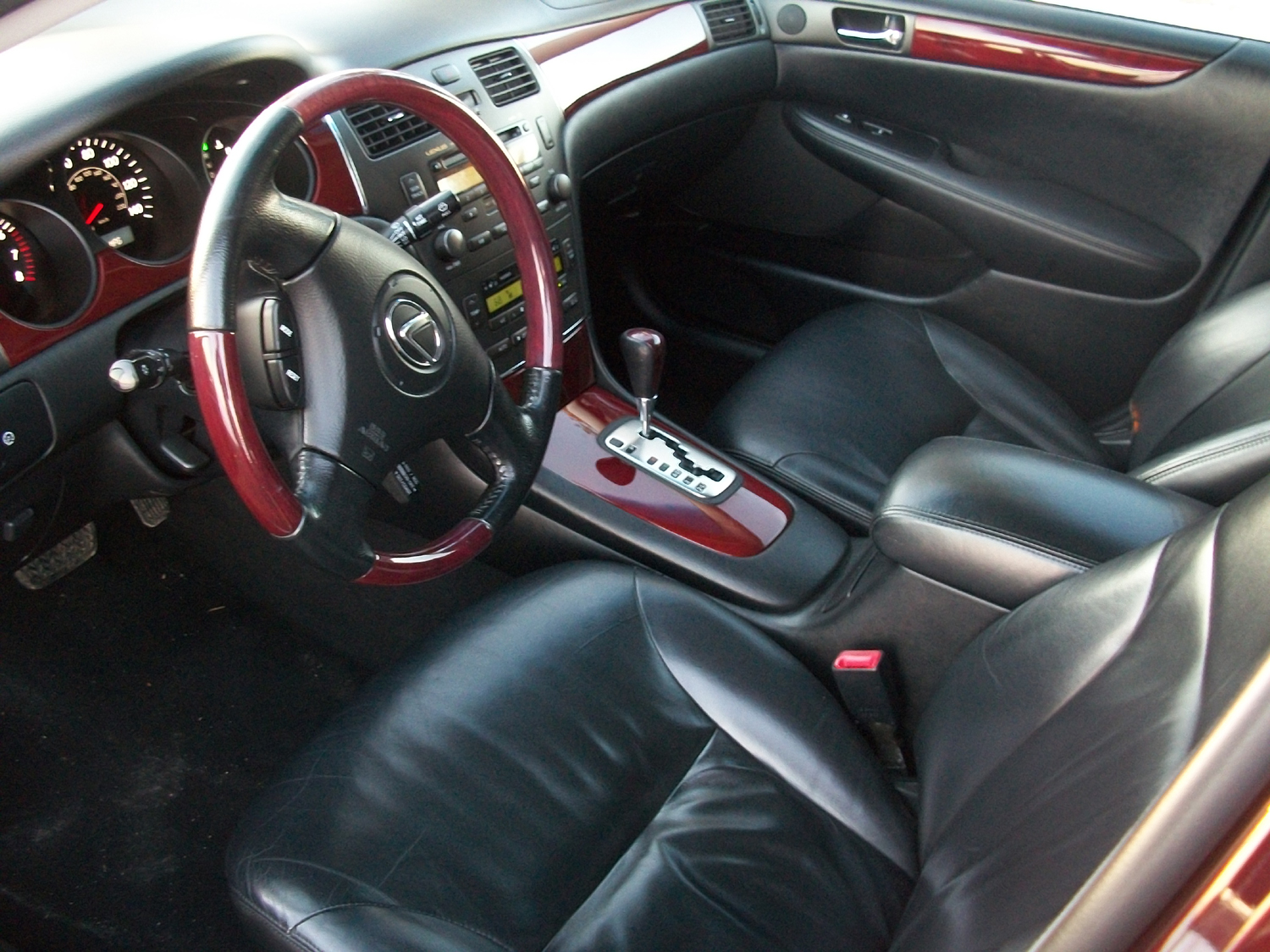
Lexus ES 300 interior (MCV30; US)

The cabin was fitted with California Walnut wood trim on the front dashboard, center console, and doors as well as exterior puddle lamps, floor-well lighting, chrome door handles, an electric rear sunblind, and rear-view mirrors that would automatically tilt downward in reverse gear. Available options, including a power rear sunshade, rain-sensing windshield wipers, a DVD-based navigation system, and a 240 watt Mark Levinson premium stereo system with a six-disc CD player, they were similar to features on the flagship LS 430 sedan.

Other features included a drive-by-wire electronic throttle, a five-speed automatic transmission, anti-lock brakes with electronic brake-force distribution and brake assist as well as electronic stability and traction control systems. The fourth generation ES was built in Kyūshū and Toyota, Aichi, Japan.

ES sales sold 71,450 units its first year, making it the best-selling luxury car in the United States. Throughout its production run, the fourth generation ES was Lexus' best-selling sedan, and outsold only in the Lexus model range by the RX luxury utility vehicle.

U.S. National Highway Traffic Safety Administration (NHTSA) crash test results in 2003 rated the ES 300 the maximum five stars in the Frontal Driver, Frontal Passenger, and Side Driver categories, and four stars in the Side Rear Passenger and Rollover categories.

The catalogue photos of the Japanese-spec XV30 series Windom were shot on location in New York City, United States. The original owner's manual included a photo of the automobile with the Twin Towers of the World Trade Center in the background. However, the Twin Towers were destroyed in the September 11 attacks, which occurred less than a month after the model's JDM launch. Within a month of the attacks, Toyota issued a revised owner's manual, this time with the Twin Towers digitally erased.

=== 2003–2006 ===
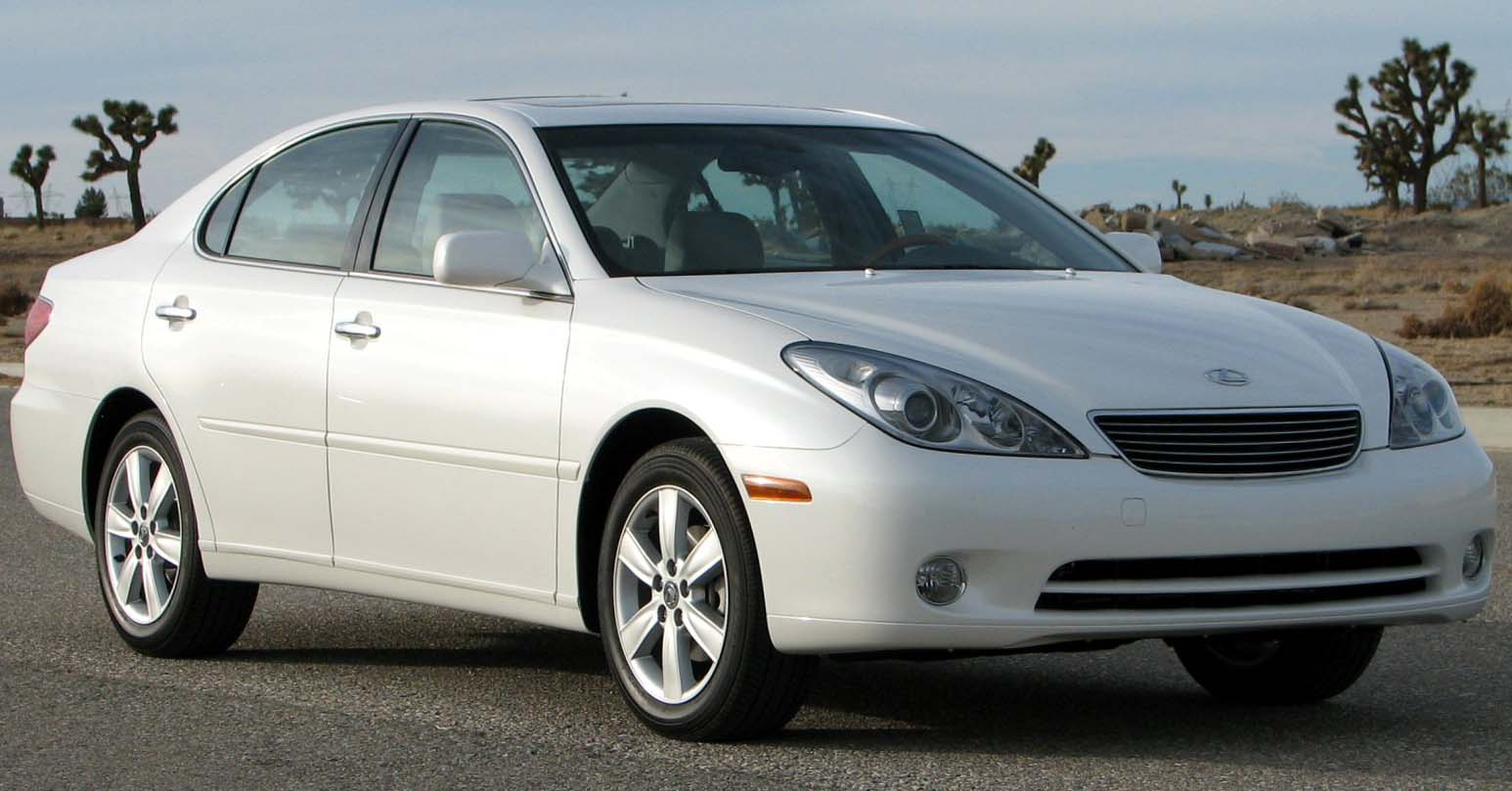
MY2006 Lexus ES 330 (MCV31)

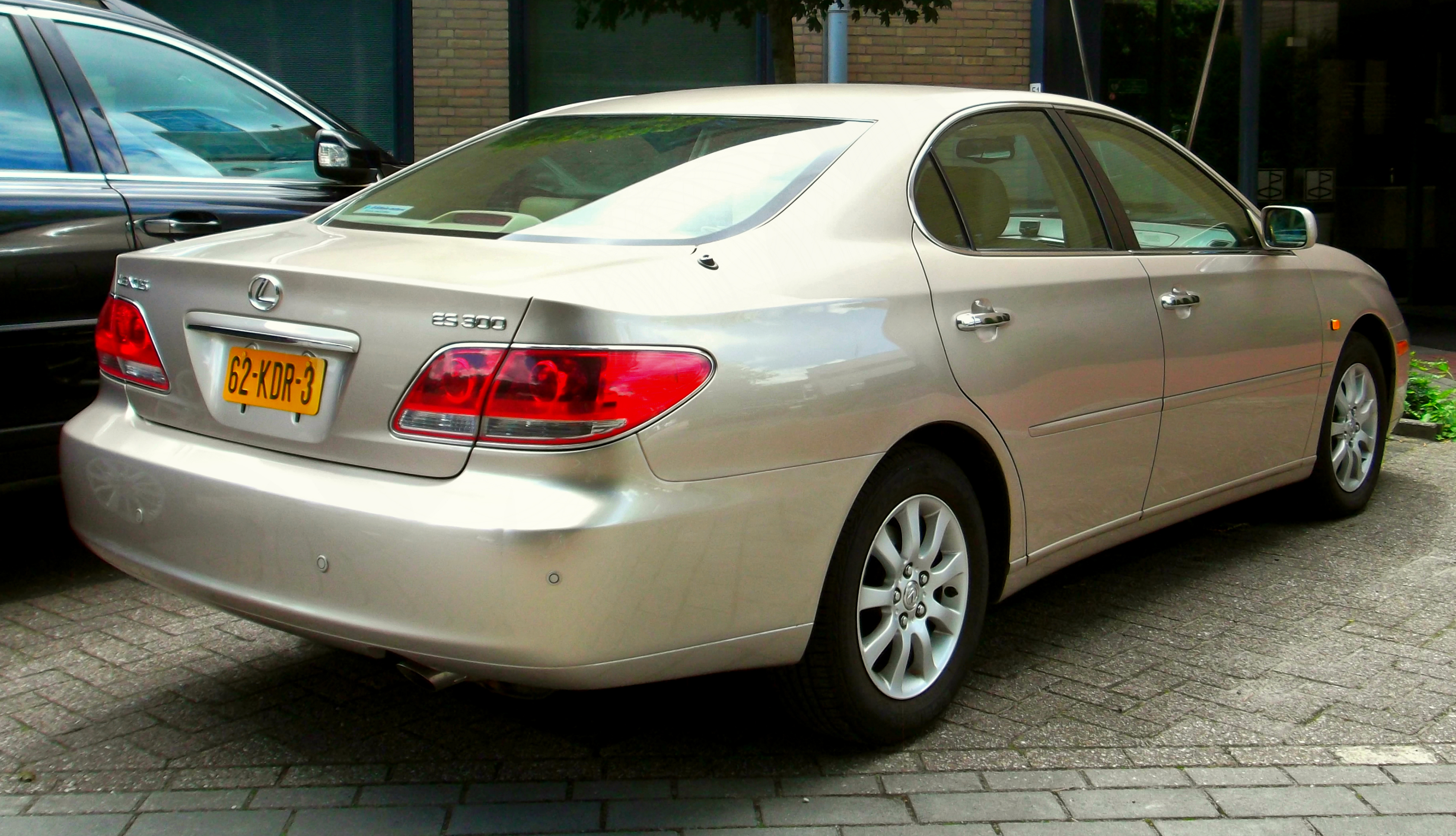
Lexus ES 300 (MCV30; facelift)

During 2003, for the 2004 model year, the American market received a revised 3.3-liter engine producing 168 kilowatts (225 hp) (later revised to 163 kilowatts (218 hp), because of changes in SAE power testing procedures), and the car was renamed the ES 330 (codename MCV31, however, the 3.0 L engine MCV30 model was still available). Lexus released the limited ES 330 "SportDesign" special edition in 2004. The model featured the Adaptive Variable Suspension, 17-inch Y-spoke alloy wheels, Mark Levinson audio, interior upgrades, and special dark exterior colors.

In 2004 for the 2005 model year, the ES received a facelift with new front and rear fascias, clear taillights, projector headlights, and a redesigned grille. Inside, features included standard audio and display steering wheel-mounted controls, power adjustable pedals, heated and ventilated front seats, Bird's Eye Maple trim and optional integrated satellite radio. Lexus also offered an exclusive ES 330 "Black Diamond Edition" in 2005, featuring black wood trim, iridescent Black Diamond paint, and a set of Tumi luggage.

== Fifth generation (XV40; 2006) ==
Fifth generation
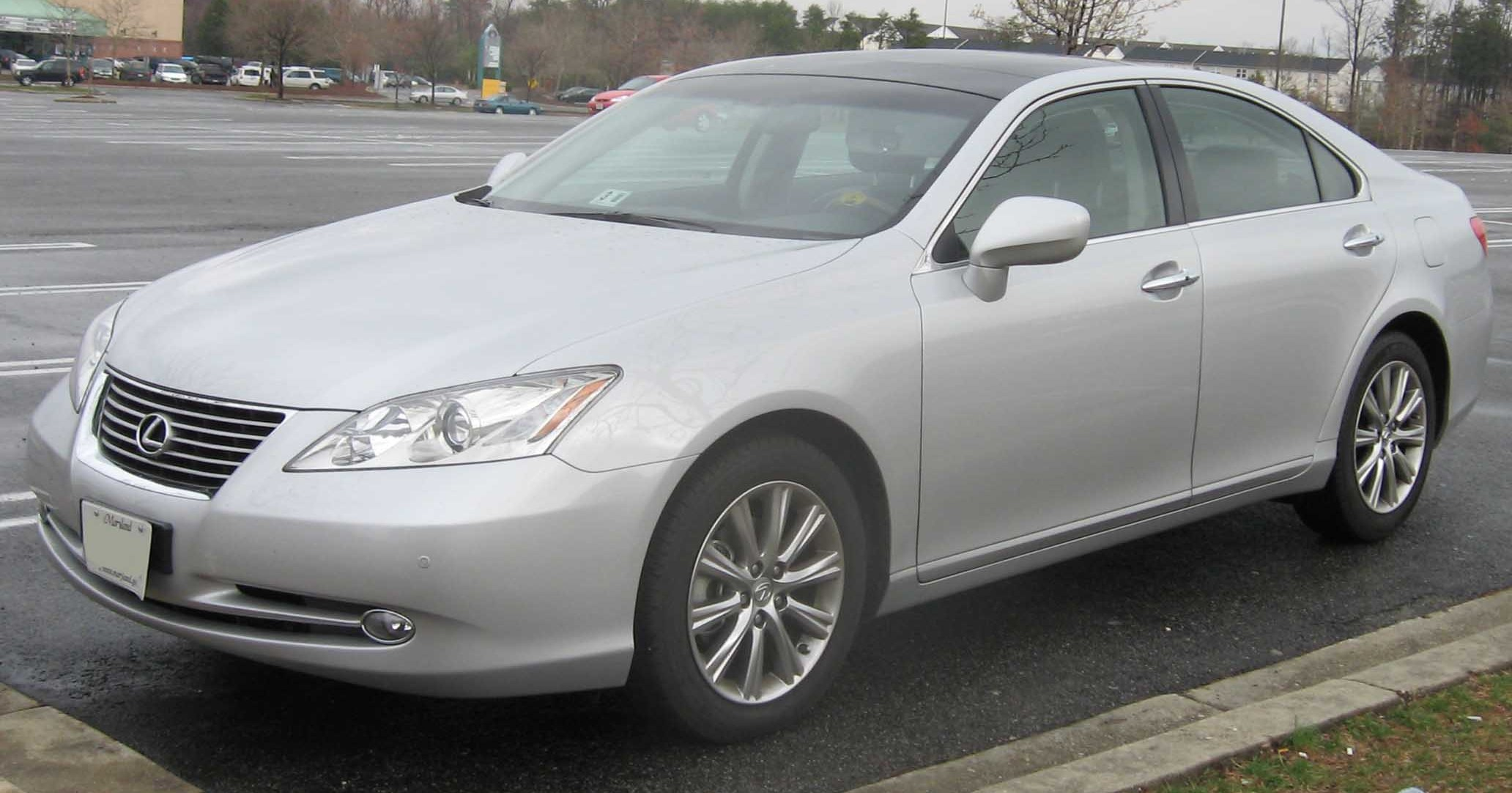
- Lexus ES 350 (GSV40; pre-facelift, US)

Overview
- Model code: XV40
- Production: March 2006 – June 2012
- Model years: 2007–2012
- Assembly: Japan: Miyawaka, Fukuoka (Toyota Motor Kyushu)
- Designer: Kengo Matsumoto (2004)

Body and chassis
- Body style: 4-door sedan
- Layout: Front-engine, front-wheel-drive
- Platform: Toyota K platform
- Related: Toyota Camry/Aurion (XV40); Lexus RX (AL10)

Powertrain
- Engine: Gasoline: 2.4 L 2AZ-FE I4; 3.5 L 2GR-FE V6
- Transmission: 6-speed U660E automatic

Dimensions
- Wheelbase: 2,776 mm (109.3 in)
- Length: 4,854 mm (191.1 in)
- Width: 1,821 mm (71.7 in)
- Height: 1,450 mm (57.1 in)

Lexus unveiled the fifth generation ES in February 2006 at the Chicago Auto Show for the 2007 model year. The line initially consisted of the ES 350 sedan, which as per previous models, featured front-wheel-drive and a V6 engine—now displacing 3.5 liters. The line was refreshed in 2009, during which more features were added, and a four-cylinder variant, the ES 240, was introduced for Asian markets. The fifth generation ES remained Lexus' top-selling sedan model in the North American and Asian markets, anchoring the marque's entry-level model lineup. Like previous generations, the fifth generation ES was geared towards the comfort luxury segment, favoring a soft ride over sporty performance. It continued the previous generation's direction of moving the ES more upscale in its design and features; Lexus touted the ES 350 as faster, more powerful, more aerodynamic, and more quiet than the original LS 400 flagship. Like its predecessors, the fifth generation ES continued to be made in Japan, at the Kyushu plant in Fukuoka, Japan. Despite being built in the country, the XV40 is left-hand drive only and was not sold in the Japanese market, as well as the other regions with right-hand drive.

=== 2006–2009 ===
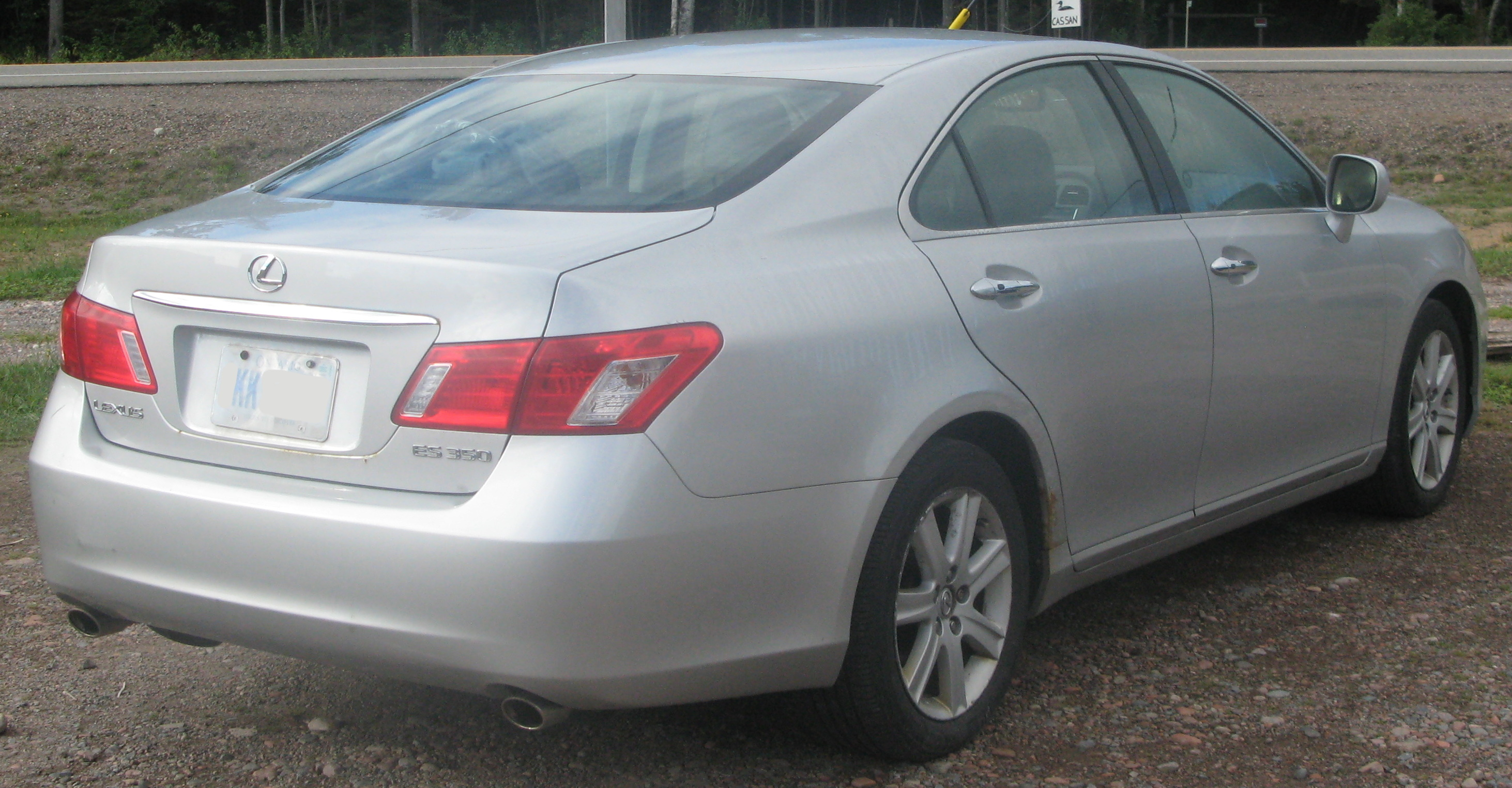
Lexus ES 350 (GSV40; pre-facelift, US)

The fifth generation ES (GSV40) debuted at the Chicago Auto Show in February 2006 as the ES 350, featuring a six-speed automatic transmission with a front-wheel drive 203 kW (272 hp) aluminum 3.5 L 2GR-FE V6 engine with intake and exhaust variable valve timing. The exterior design featured an all-new body in the style of Lexus' new design philosophy, L-finesse. The new design was sleeker than its predecessor, with a streamlined cabin and character lines across the hood, fenders, and rear pillars. The Lexus emblem returned to the grille for the first time since the first generation, and was placed at the center of a five-bar horizontal grille. For the debut 2007 models, Lexus introduced a number of unique colors exclusive to the ES 350, including Aquamarine Pearl, Royal Ruby Metallic, Moon Shell Mica, and Amber Pearl. The drag coefficient was C_{d} 0.28. Compared to the preceding fourth generation ES 300/330, the fifth generation ES 350 was 51 millimetres (2 in) longer and 10 millimetres (0.4 in) wider overall, but with shorter overhangs.

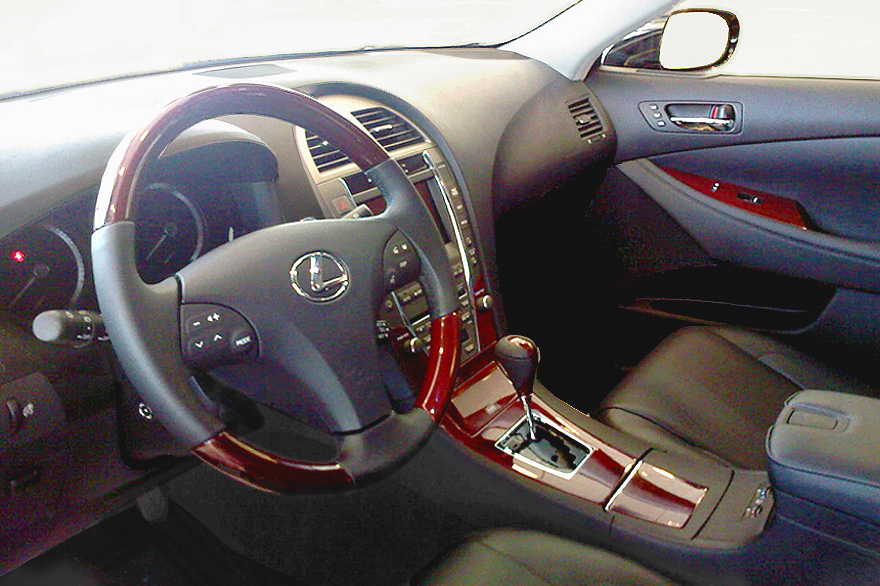
Lexus ES 350 interior (GSV40)

The ES 350 interior featured walnut wood accents, leather seats, dual zone climate control with air filter, an MP3 player auxiliary input, power tilt and telescoping steering wheel, and eight standard airbags. A keyless entry and ignition system, Lexus SmartAccess, which does not require the electronic remote to be taken out of the driver's pocket, was standard. Available new features included a 300-watt, 14-speaker Mark Levinson premium audio system, power seat cushion extender, radar-based adaptive cruise control, rain-sensing windshield wipers, power rear sunshade, DVD navigation system, and Lexus Park Assist, a sonar-based warning system with backup camera. For the first time, the ES offered an "Ultra Luxury Package," which featured many of the aforementioned options along with a three-panel panoramic glass moonroof. The ES also featured a secondary start system, that runs on battery, so that the driver does not have to use the engine for accessory functions. The secondary system allowed the driver use the radio, GPS, Bluetooth, and air conditioning/heating. The instrument panel used Optitron gauges and LED lighting.

Lexus estimated that the ES 350's engine-transmission combination allowed acceleration to 97 km/h (60 mph) in less than 7 seconds, but tests netted the ES 350 as being one of the fastest front-wheel drive luxury sedans then available. 0–97 km/h (60 mph) was acquired in as little as 6.2 seconds by auto magazines, and the car showed a strong point of high-end power as it cleared the quarter-mile in 14.6 seconds while traveling at almost 100 mph (160 km/h). Fuel economy was estimated at 21 mpg_{‑US} (11.2 L/100 km; 25.2 mpg_{‑imp}) in the city and 30 mpg_{‑US} (7.8 L/100 km; 36.0 mpg_{‑imp}) on the highway. Some commentators have complained that so much power to the front wheels has produced uncomfortable torque steer in both the new ES and Camry.

The ES 350 arrived at U.S. dealerships in late April 2006 as a 2007 model. The 2007 base price in the U.S. was $33,470. That year, the ES 350 was launched in North America, the Middle East, China (excluding Hong Kong and Macau), South Korea and Taiwan. At the 2008 Chicago Auto Show, Lexus debuted a Pebble Beach Edition ES 350, produced in partnership with the Pebble Beach Company. The Pebble Beach ES 350 came in either Truffle Mica, Pearl Silver, or Obsidian Black exterior colors, with exterior and interior badging, along with the choice of either travel or golf products by the Callaway Golf Company or Viking Range cookware.

Safety features on the ES 350 included dual front airbags, knee airbags, side-torso and curtain airbags, along with traction control, Vehicle Stability Control (VSC), anti-lock brakes (ABS), and electronic brake-force distribution (EBD). A pre-collision system (PCS), which incorporates a grille-mounted sensor and retracts seatbelts and triggers full braking power, was optional, and came with the distance-aware Dynamic Radar Cruise Control system. The front passenger airbag used a twin-chamber design for reduced occupant discomfort upon deployment. The National Highway Traffic Safety Administration (NHTSA) crash test results in 2007 rated the ES 350 the maximum five stars in the Frontal Driver, Frontal Passenger, and Side Driver categories, and four stars in the Side Rear Passenger and Rollover categories.

Toyota recalled and replaced 55,000 optional all-weather rubber floor mats from the Camry and ES 350 in September 2007, citing the risk of unsecured mats jamming the accelerator pedal. In August 2009, the NHTSA probed the ES 350 following 40 acceleration control complaints, eight crashes and 12 injuries, with floor mats implicated in most cases. An accident involving a loaner ES 350 killed four persons near San Diego on 28 August. The NHTSA and San Diego County Sheriff's Department found that the car was wrongly fitted with an unsecured SUV rubber floor mat; the mat had jammed the accelerator, which an earlier driver had complained about. On 29 September, a Toyota safety notice advised floor mat removal, shift to Neutral (N) gear in an emergency, with a 3-second push button ignition press for engine shutoff. On 29 November, the 2007–2010 MY floor mat recall was revised to add shorter accelerator pedals, thinner replacement mats, and a brake override feature which ignores accelerator input when the brake pedal is depressed.

=== 2009–2012 ===
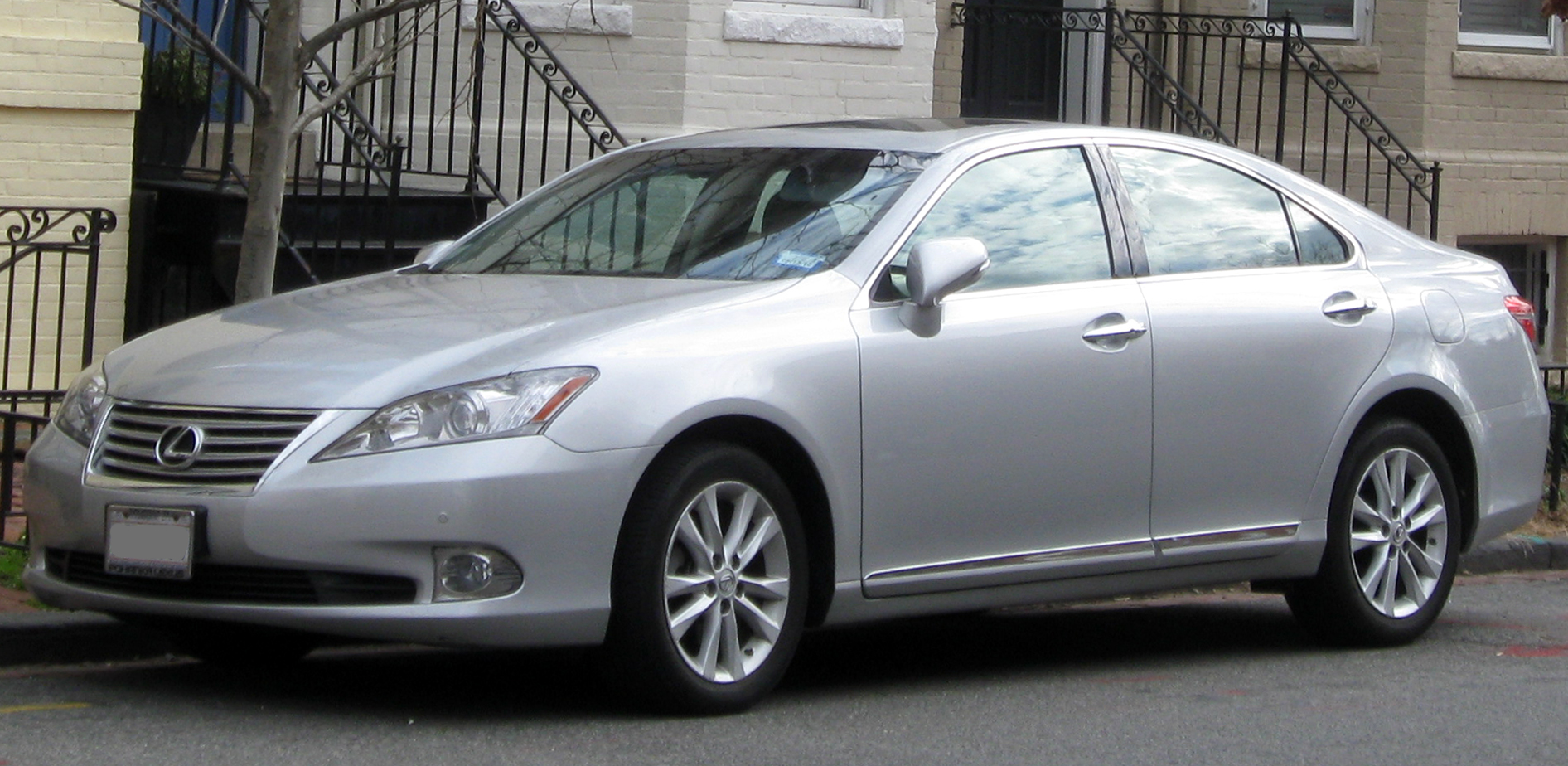
2010 Lexus ES 350 (GSV40; facelift, US)

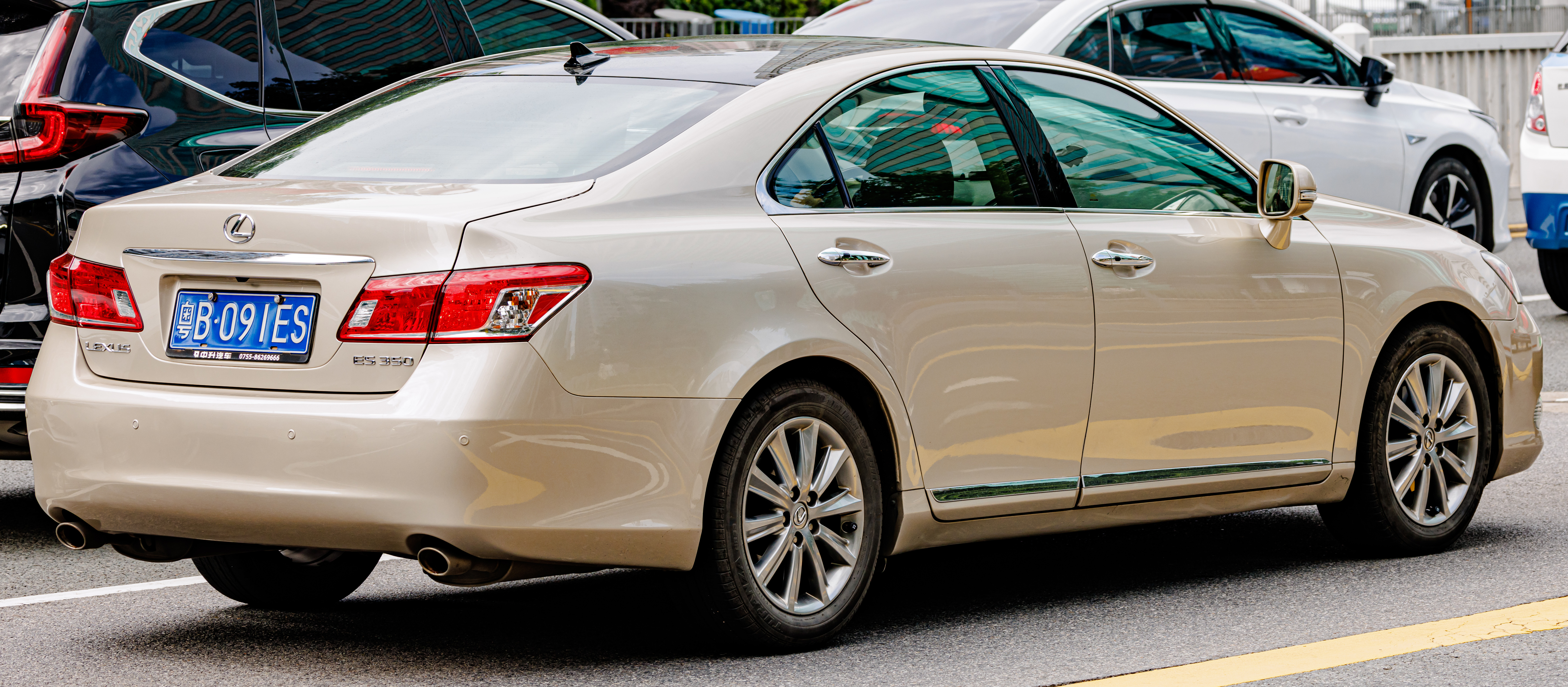
Lexus ES 350 (GSV40; facelift, China)

In 2009, the 2010 model year ES underwent a mid-cycle facelift. A slightly revised grille resembled that of the new HS 250h, and the lower bumper and taillights were changed. Other exterior changes included chrome-trimmed side moulding, turn signal indicators on the side mirrors, and new split 5-spoke alloy wheels. Memory seating, rain-sensing windshield wipers, and rear seat-mounted side-impact airbags were now standard. The steering wheel controls now had hard touch buttons as opposed to the previous soft ones. The navigation system shared with the then current RX now included upgraded VoiceBox speech recognition, Bluetooth phone book downloading, and Lexus Insider, XM Weather, Sports, and Stocks reports, and switched from DVD based maps to an internal hard drive. Bluetooth streaming audio and a USB port that included iPod integration was now built into the stereo.

In 2010, the revised ES line gained a brake override feature which ignored accelerator input when the brake pedal was depressed, which was installed on new builds from January 2010. Debuting first in the Chinese auto market, the 2010 ES lineup added a second model, the ES 240 (ACV40), which was produced to comply with the country's new emission laws for luxury cars, making it the first gasoline four-cylinder Lexus since the 2005 IS. The ES 240 received a 2.4L 2AZ-FE inline-four engine producing 123 kW (165 hp) and 224 N⋅m (165 ft⋅lbf) of torque at 4000 rpm.

Several awards won by the fifth generation ES include 2009 Best Upscale Car for the Money from U.S News & World Report, AutoPacific 2009 Vehicle Satisfaction Award for Best Mid-size Luxury Car, and Best New Luxury Car (under $50k) Award in 2007 at the Canadian Car of the Year Awards, selected by the Automobile Journalists Association of Canada. The ES 350 has also been named Consumer Guide 2008 Best Buy in the Premium Midsize Class, ConsumerSearch Best "budget" luxury sedan of 2008, Kiplinger's Personal Finance Best New Car for 2007, and Best in Class for 2008, Intellichoice Best Car Value Over $23,000 for 2007, and Polk Automotive Loyalty award for 2008.

== Sixth generation (XV60; 2012) ==
Sixth generation
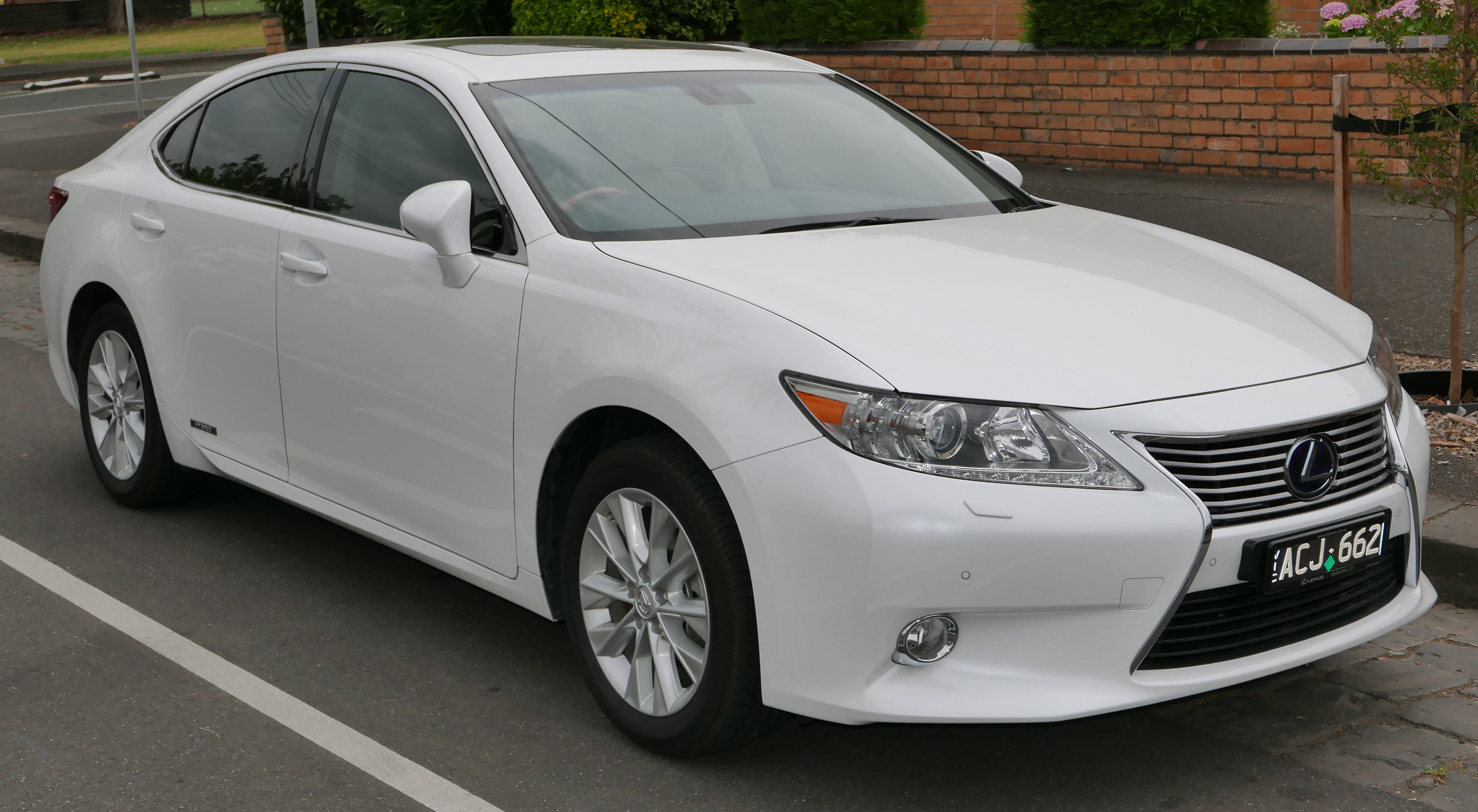
- Lexus ES 300h (AVV60; pre-facelift)

Overview
- Model code: XV60
- Production: July 2012 – August 2018; October 2015 – August 2018 (US manufacturing)
- Model years: 2013–2018
- Assembly: Japan: Miyawaka, Fukuoka (Toyota Motor Kyushu); United States: Georgetown, Kentucky (TMMK: 2015–2018)
- Designer: Pansoo Kwon, Yuji Fujiwara (2010)

Body and chassis
- Body style: 4-door sedan
- Layout: Front-engine, front-wheel-drive
- Platform: Toyota K platform
- Related: Toyota Camry (XV50); Toyota Avalon (XX40); Lexus RX (AL20)

Powertrain
- Engine: Gasoline: 2.0 L 6AR-FSE I4; 2.5 L 2AR-FE I4; 3.5 L 2GR-FE V6; Gasoline hybrid: 2.5 L 2AR-FXE I4
- Transmission: 6-speed automatic; eCVT (hybrid)

Dimensions
- Wheelbase: 2,820 mm (111.0 in)
- Length: 4,895 mm (192.7 in)
- Width: 1,820 mm (71.7 in)
- Height: 1,450 mm (57.1 in)

=== 2012–2015 ===
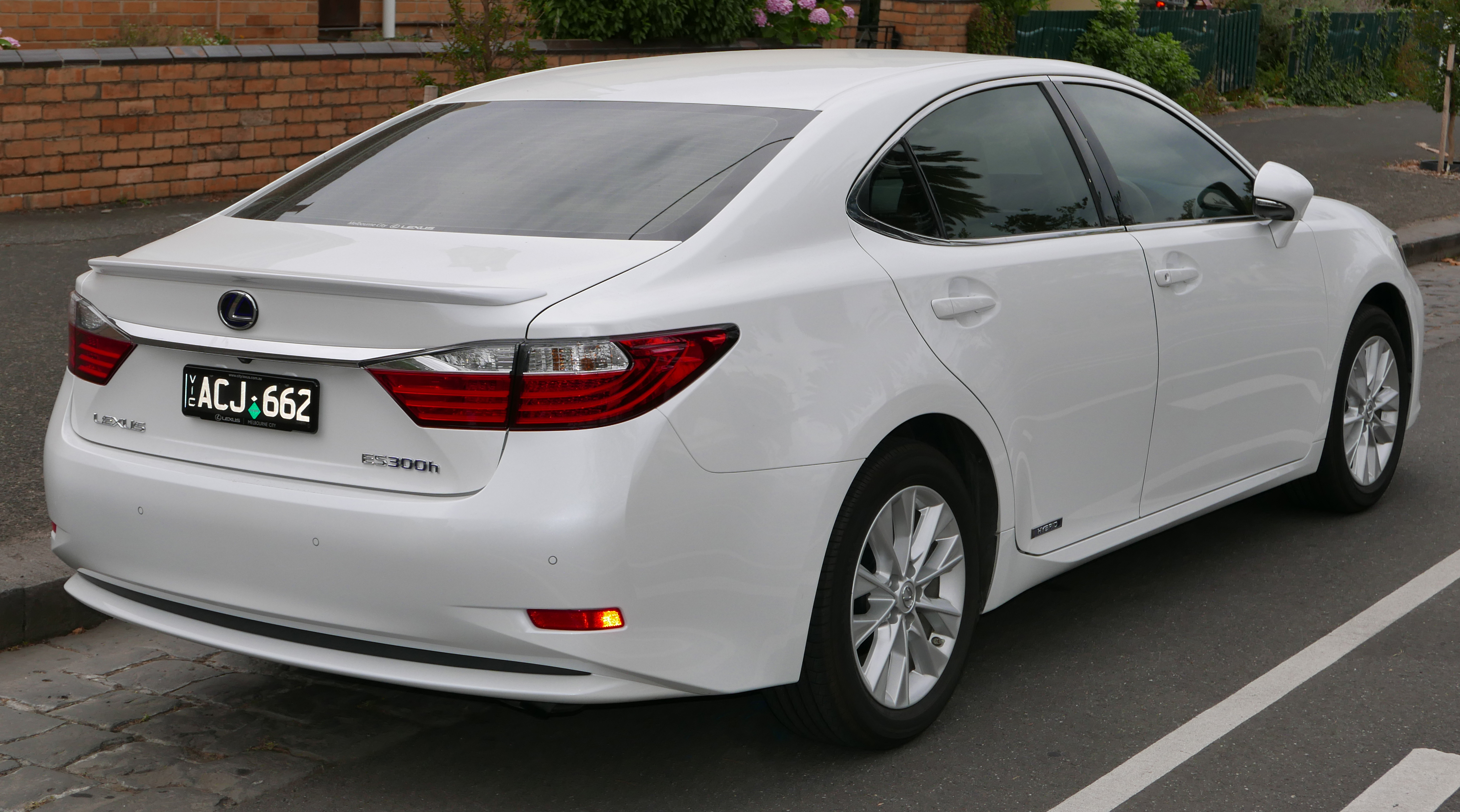
Lexus ES 300h (AVV60; pre-facelift)

The sixth generation ES was revealed on 4 April 2012 at the New York International Auto Show. For its sixth generation, the model was introduced in ES 350 and hybrid ES 300h versions. The ES 350 came with a six-speed automatic transmission, while the hybrid ES 300h models came with an eCVT. Despite the fact that the redesigned ES and the XV50 series Camry still share the same platform, the two vehicles are somewhat less mechanically related, as the ES is now more closely related to the XX40 series Avalon which also uses a 2,800 mm (111 in) wheelbase. The interior added the Lexus Remote Touch interface, and an optional 835 watt Mark Levinson sound system. Several safety features were introduced for the 2013 model year such as Blind Spot Monitor with Rear Cross Traffic Alert (RCTA), Lane Departure Alert (LDA), and Pre-Collision System (PCS) but only in the highest package, the Technology package. All models had 10 airbags, and a backup camera was included with either the optional Display Audio package or HDD Navigation System.

The ES 250 made its world debut at the April 2012 Beijing International Automotive Exhibition. This car is equipped with a 2.5-liter inline-four engine and a six-speed automatic transmission. ES 250, ES 300h, and ES 350 models are being offered in China. Production started on 6 July 2012 at Toyota Motor Kyushu's Miyata plant.

This generation is export-only, not sold in Japan where it is manufactured, but has been offered in right-hand drive since late 2013, being sold in Australia, Brunei, South Africa, New Zealand, Singapore, Hong Kong, Malaysia, and Indonesia.

=== 2015–2018 ===
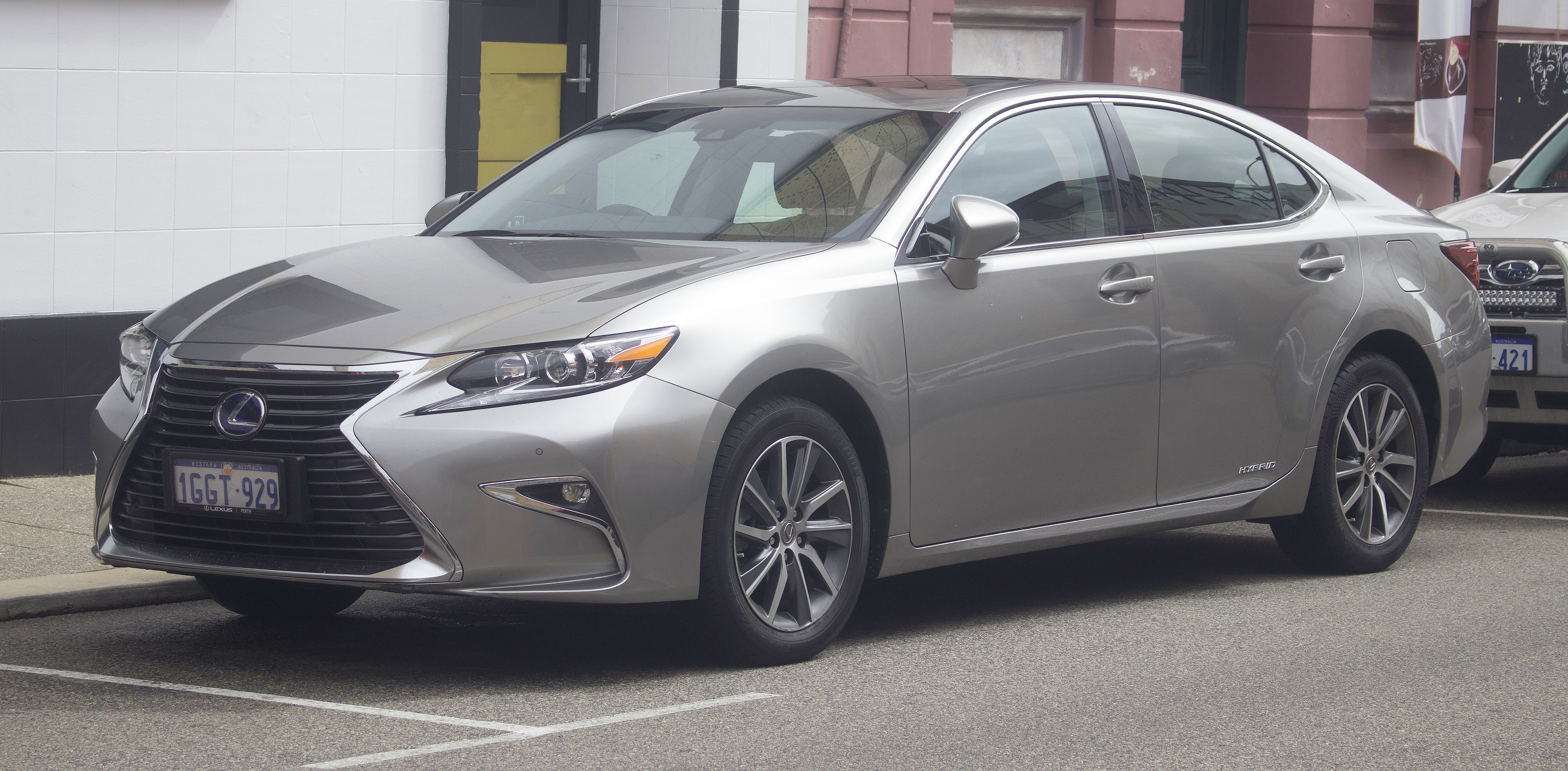

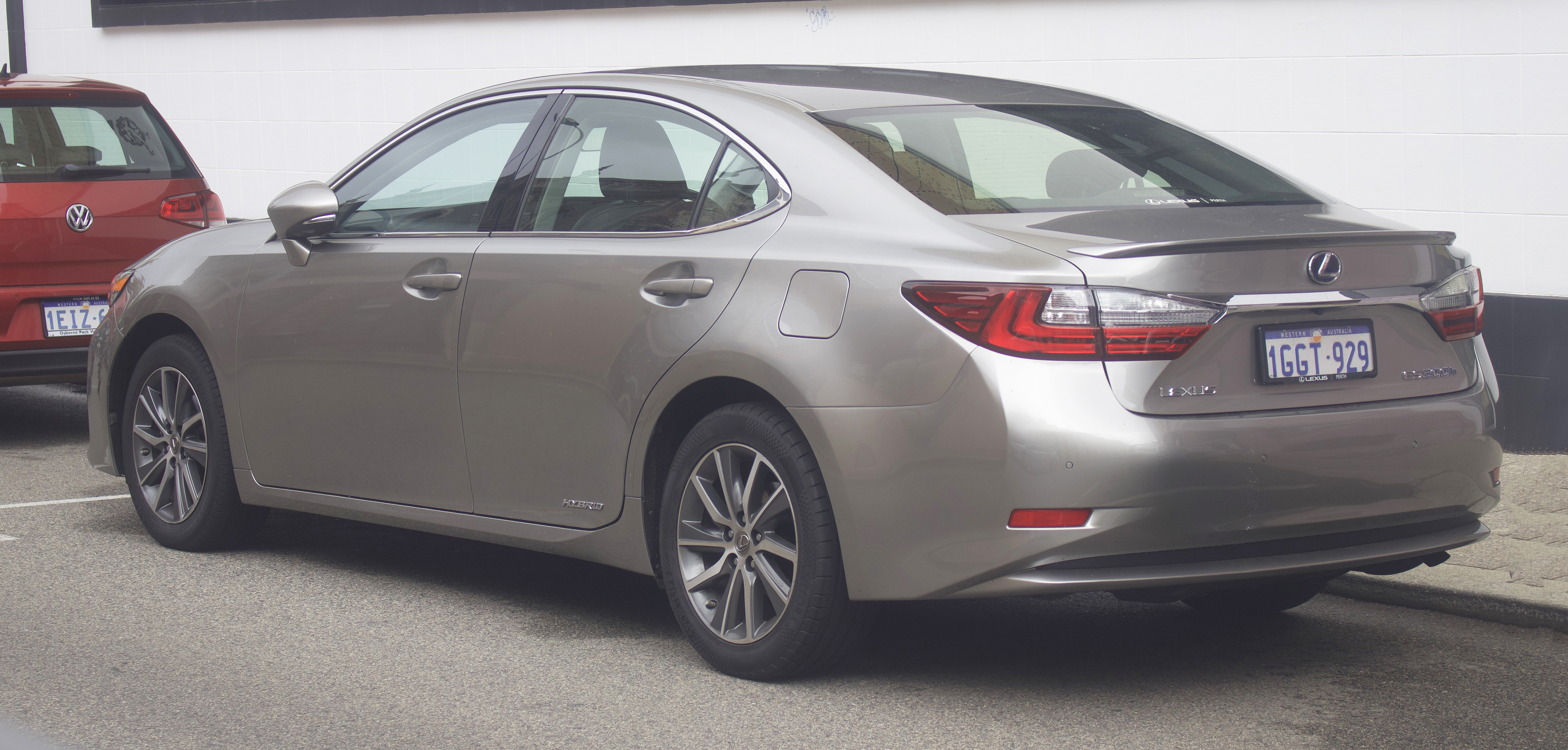
Facelift

The facelifted ES was unveiled at the April 2015 Shanghai International Automobile Industry Exhibition. Production of the updated ES 350 began at the Kentucky plant on 19 October 2015 for the 2016 model year—the first Lexus vehicle manufactured in the US.

The ES is also manufactured by Toyota Motor Kyushu for markets outside North America. This plant also supplies the hybrid ES to all global markets, as the Kentucky plant builds the ES 350 only and does not build the ES 300h.

== Seventh generation (XZ10; 2018) ==
Seventh generation
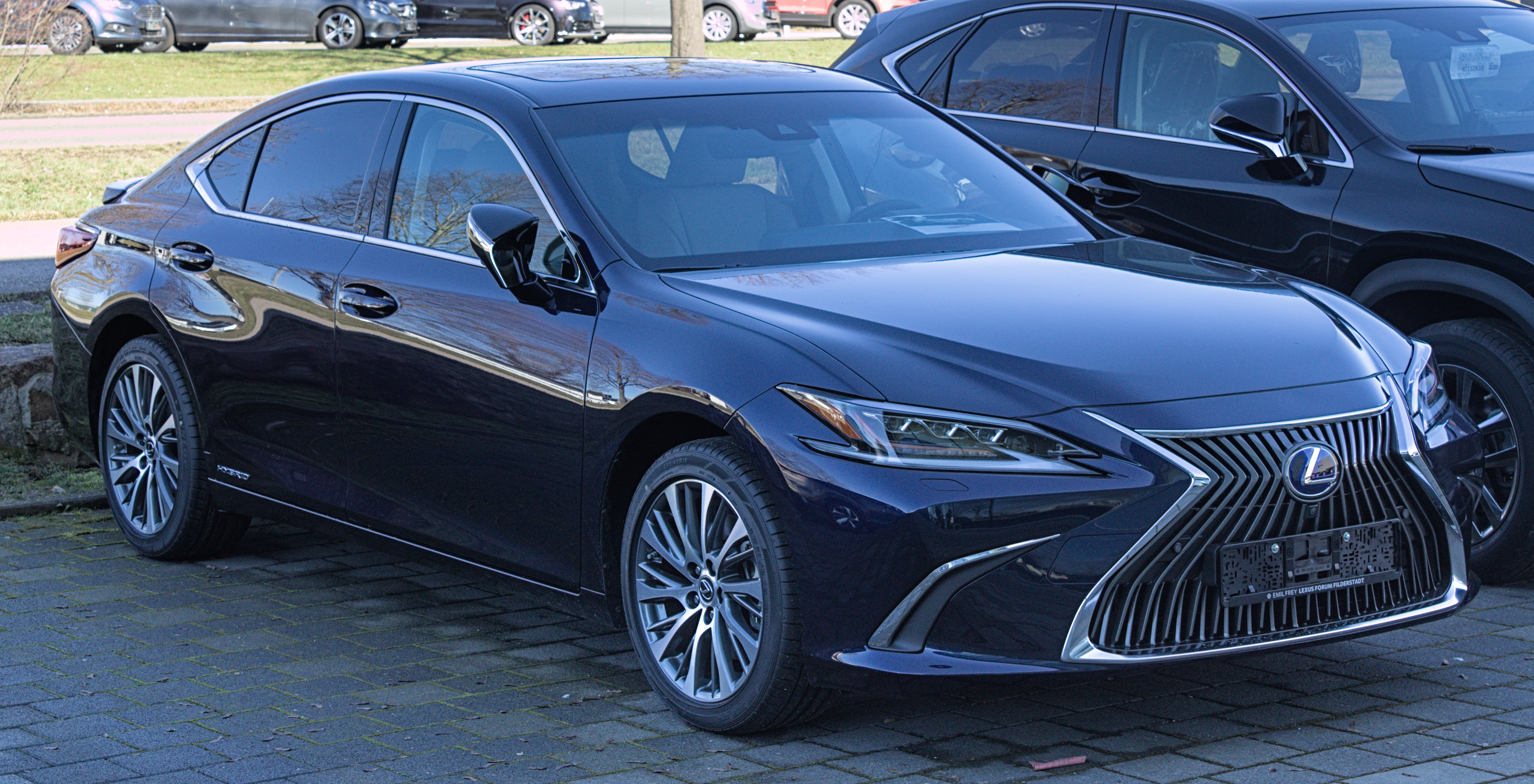
- Lexus ES 300h (AXZH10; pre-facelift)

Overview
- Model code: XZ10
- Production: August 2018 – December 2025; August 2018 – February 2026 (US manufacturing)
- Model years: 2019–2025
- Assembly: Japan: Miyawaka, Fukuoka (Toyota Motor Kyushu); United States: Georgetown, Kentucky (TMMK); India: Bidadi, Karnataka (2020–2026, CKD, TKMPL)
- Designer: Yasuo Kajino (chief: 2013–2016)

Body and chassis
- Body style: 4-door sedan
- Layout: Front-engine, front-wheel-drive; Front-engine, four-wheel-drive (2020–present)
- Platform: TNGA: GA-K
- Related: Toyota Avalon (XX50); Toyota Camry (XV70); Lexus RX (ALA10/ALH10)

Powertrain
- Engine: Gasoline: 2.0 L 6AR-FSE I4 (ES 200); 2.0 L M20A-FKS I4 (ES 200); 2.5 L A25A-FKS I4 (ES 250/ES 260 in China); 3.5 L 2GR-FKS V6 (ES 350); Gasoline hybrid: 2.5 L A25A-FXS I4 (ES 300h); 2.5 L A25B-FXS I4 (ES 300h, China)
- Electric motor: 88 kW (118 hp; 120 PS) 3NM synchronous (ES 300h)
- Power output: 127 kW (170 hp; 173 PS) (ES 200, M20A-FKS); 152 kW (204 hp; 207 PS) (ES 250/260); 131 kW (176 hp; 178 PS) (ES 300h, gasoline engine only); 160 kW (215 hp; 218 PS) (ES 300h, combined system output); 225 kW (302 hp; 306 PS) (ES 350)
- Transmission: 6-speed automatic (ES 200; 6AR-FSE); 8-speed "Direct Shift" automatic (ES 250/260/ES 350); K120 CVT with physical first gear (ES 200; M20A-FKS); eCVT with sequential shift mode (ES 300h)
- Hybrid drivetrain: Power-split
- Battery: 1.6 kWh NiMH (ES 300h, up to 2020); 1.6 kWh Li-ion (ES 300h, 2021 onward)

Dimensions
- Wheelbase: 2,870 mm (113.0 in)
- Length: 4,960–4,975 mm (195.3–195.9 in)
- Width: 1,865 mm (73.4 in)
- Height: 1,445–1,455 mm (56.9–57.3 in)
- Curb weight: 1,650–1,740 kg (3,638–3,836 lb)

The seventh generation ES was unveiled at the April 2018 Beijing International Automotive Exhibition. It is built on the same GA-K platform as the XX50 series Avalon and the XV70 series Camry. The F Sport variant also made its debut in this generation. All models come equipped with Lexus Safety System+ 2.0.

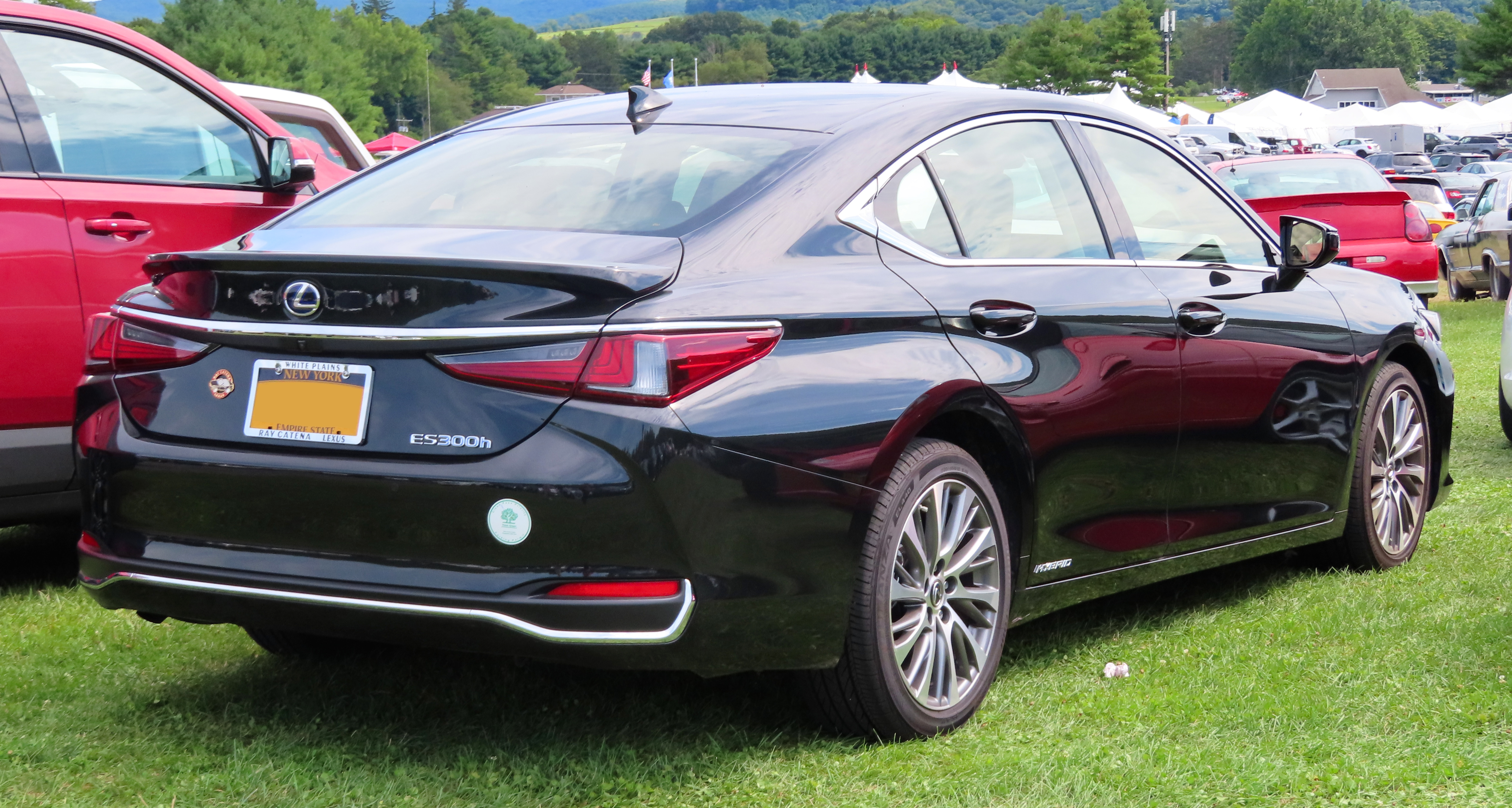
Rear view

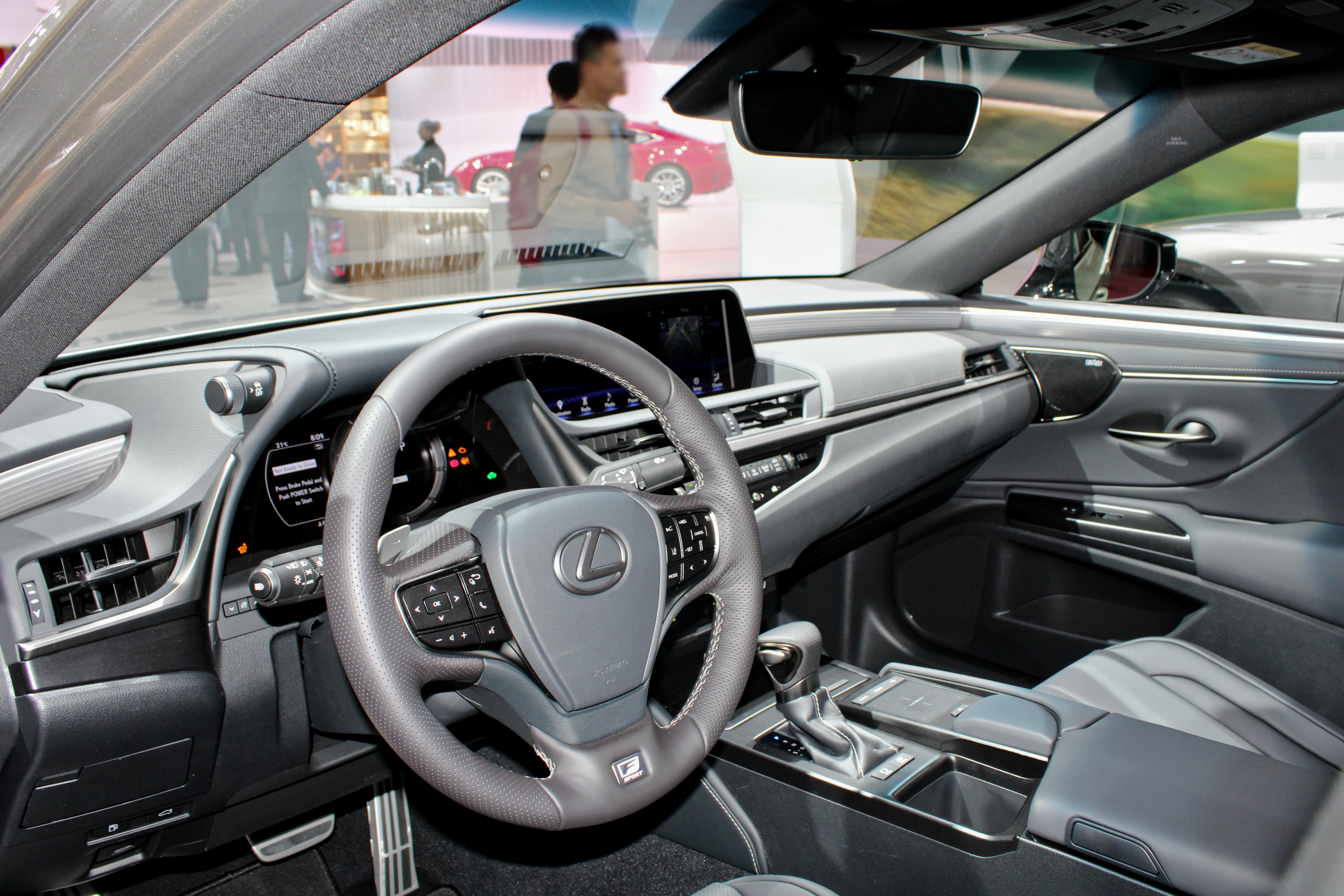
Interior

=== Markets ===
==== South Africa ====
The ES commenced sales in South Africa in October 2018. Two engine variants were offered; the ES250 petrol, and ES300h hybrid. The former was available in EX trim, while latter was offered in a more premium SE trim level. Nine color options were offered, including two exclusive to the ES in South Africa. All models offered Lexus South Africa's 7-year/105,000 km warranty and maintenance plan.

In late 2021, along with the rollout of the facelift, an additional model began being offered; the ES300h EX.

==== Asia ====
The ES was scheduled to be available in Japanese dealerships in the fourth quarter of 2018, making the debut of ES in the Japanese domestic market since the discontinuation of the XV30-based Windom as well as the introduction of the Lexus brand to Japan 13 years prior.

Initial deliveries of ES 300h started on 24 October 2018 in Japan, where it replaced the smaller HS 250h and served as a front-wheel-drive counterpart of GS until the latter's demise in 2020.

The Hong Kong model was unveiled on 15 September 2018. Models included the ES250 Executive/Premium and the ES300h Executive/Premium. Lexus Safety System+ became standard in 2019.

The Thai model was unveiled on 17 August 2018. Models included the ES 300h Luxury/Grand Luxury/Premium.

Lexus began local assembly of the ES 300h in India, at its new assembly line at Toyota India's plant in January 2020. Lexus is said to have invested $100 million in this new assembly line.

==== Europe ====
The seventh generation ES is the first to be sold in Europe, replacing the GS. It went on sale from September 2018 in Russia and other Eastern markets and from December 2018 in Western and Central Europe.

==== North America ====
===== United States =====
In the US, the ES lineup went on sale in September 2018.

The US market ES was redesigned with an F Sport Trim that was never available on the ES line. This was done to attract a younger audience into purchasing or leasing an ES. The 2019 model year line-up includes three trim levels – the base 3.5-liters trim, the Hybrid trim and the F Sport 3.5-liters trim. All ES models comes standard with Lexus Safety System+ 2.0 that includes Pre-Collision System (PCS) with Pedestrian Detection, Lane Departure Alert with Steering Assist, Dynamic Radar Cruise Control (DRCC), Lane Tracing Assist (LTA) and Road Sign Assist (RSA). The ES also features Apple CarPlay as an option. Other options include the Mark Levinson surround audio system and navigation with Amazon Alexa support.

Originally, only the ES 350 and ES 300h were offered. Initial production was sourced from both Kentucky and Japan for the 2019 model year, but the majority of US models were domestically assembled. In 2020, for the 2021 model year, the ES 250 was added that also introduced Toyota's AWD drivetrain previously known as All-Trac. A Black Line Special Edition package was also added for the F Sport. For the hybrid (ES 300h), the 1.6 kWh nickel–metal hydride battery was replaced by a more compact 1.6 kWh lithium-ion battery. The 12 cm (4.7 in) reduction in the height of the pack freed up trunk space, and the lower weight improved the front-to-rear weight distribution, which benefited handling.

=== 2021 facelift ===
The first facelift model was unveiled in April 2021 for the 2022 model year. It was the first year that offered an AWD, the 50/50 maximum torque distribution provided equal torque between the front and rear wheels. The grille has a spindle design with horizontal slats instead of a mesh design and smaller side scoops were used on the sides of the car than the previous year. The daytime running lights got updated, featuring V-shaped LEDs. The interior also got updated. The infotainment system got a touch-screen, and it also had the touch pad from the center console. The standard 8-inch was moved up an extra 4.3 inches for easier accessibility. A 12.3-inch unit was offered in 2021. There were also rear view cameras added instead mirrors for better visibility, and they were installed at the bottom of the A-pillar.

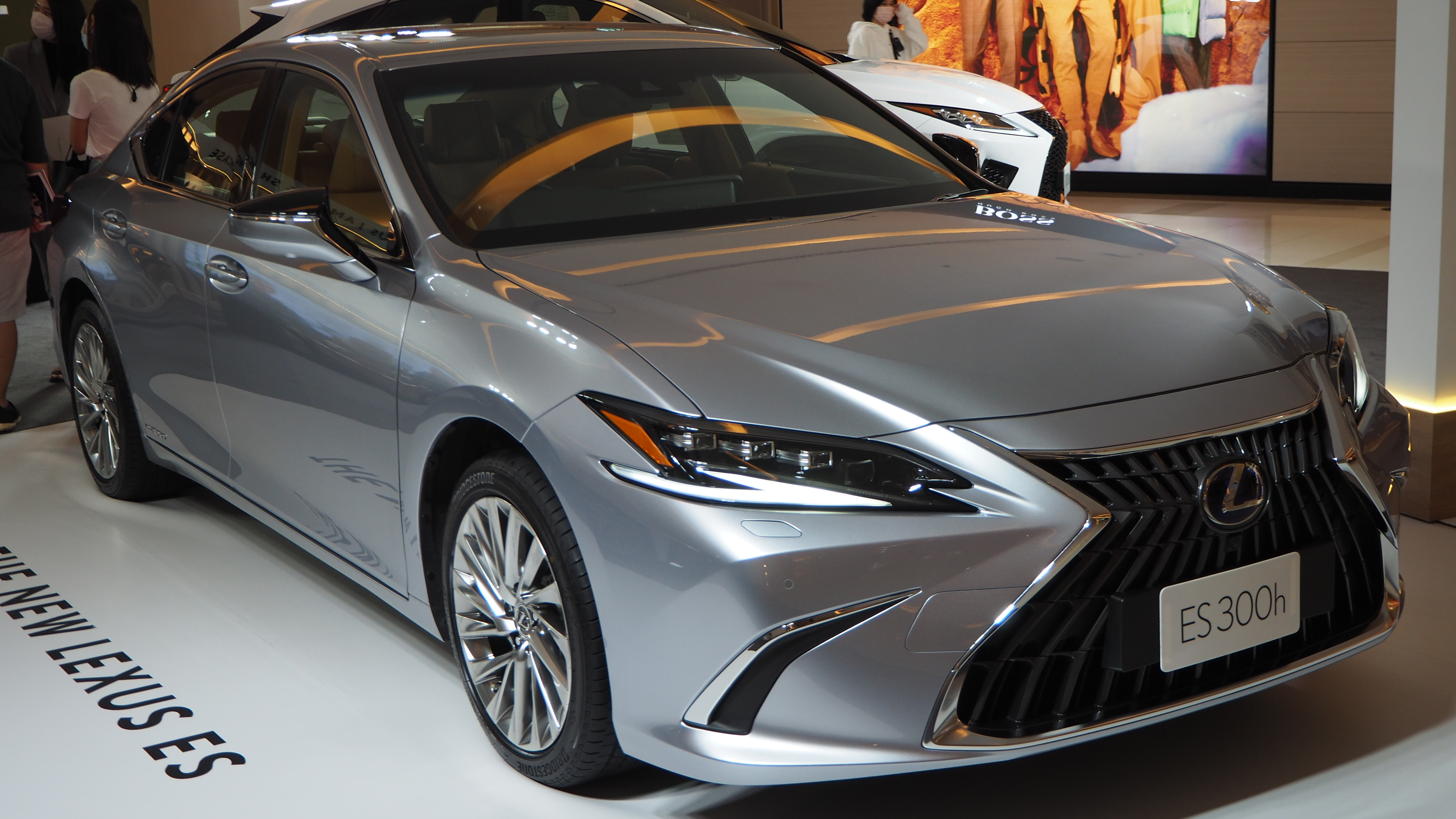
ES 300h (AXZH11; first facelift)

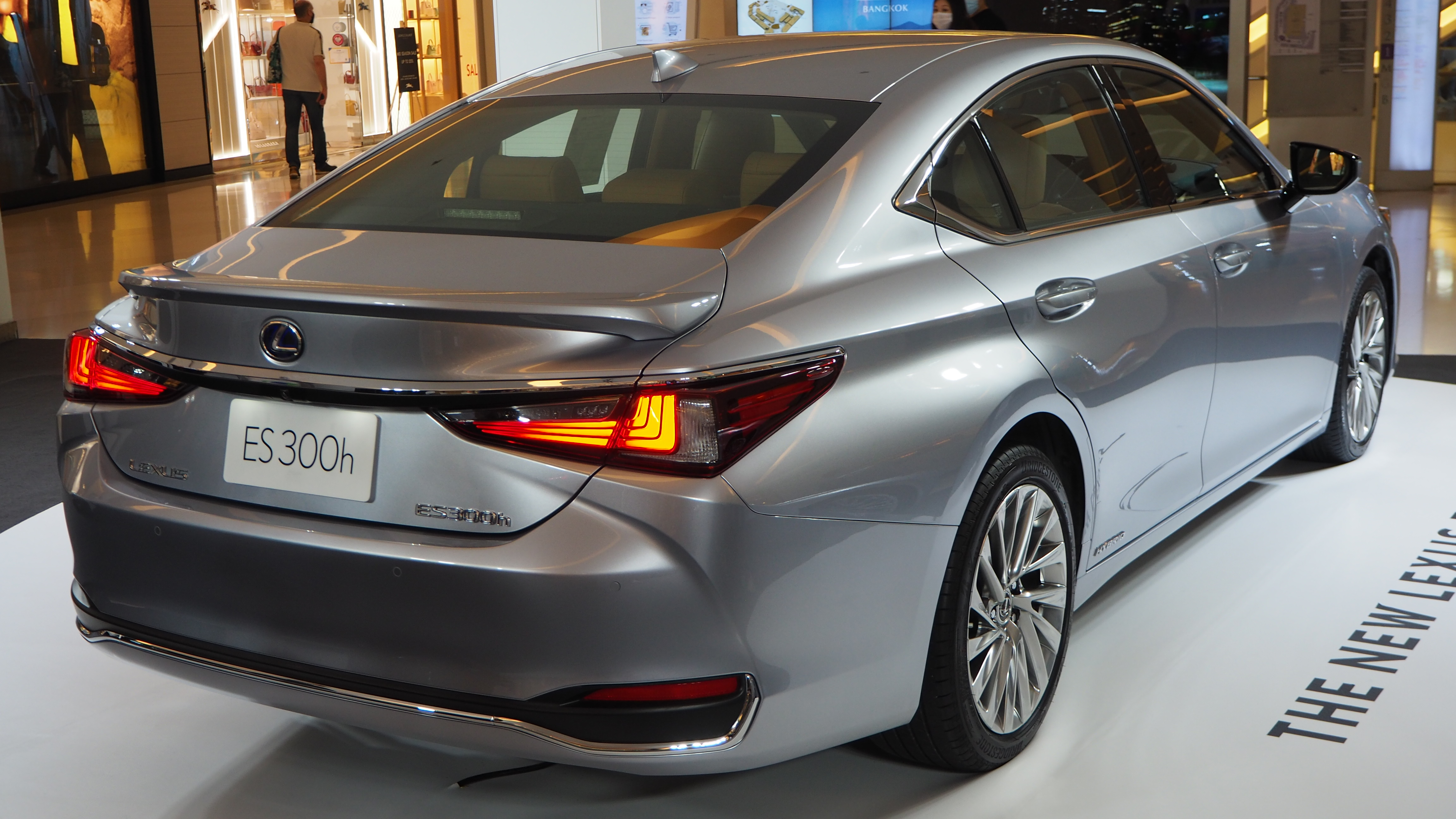
ES 300h (AXZH11; first facelift)

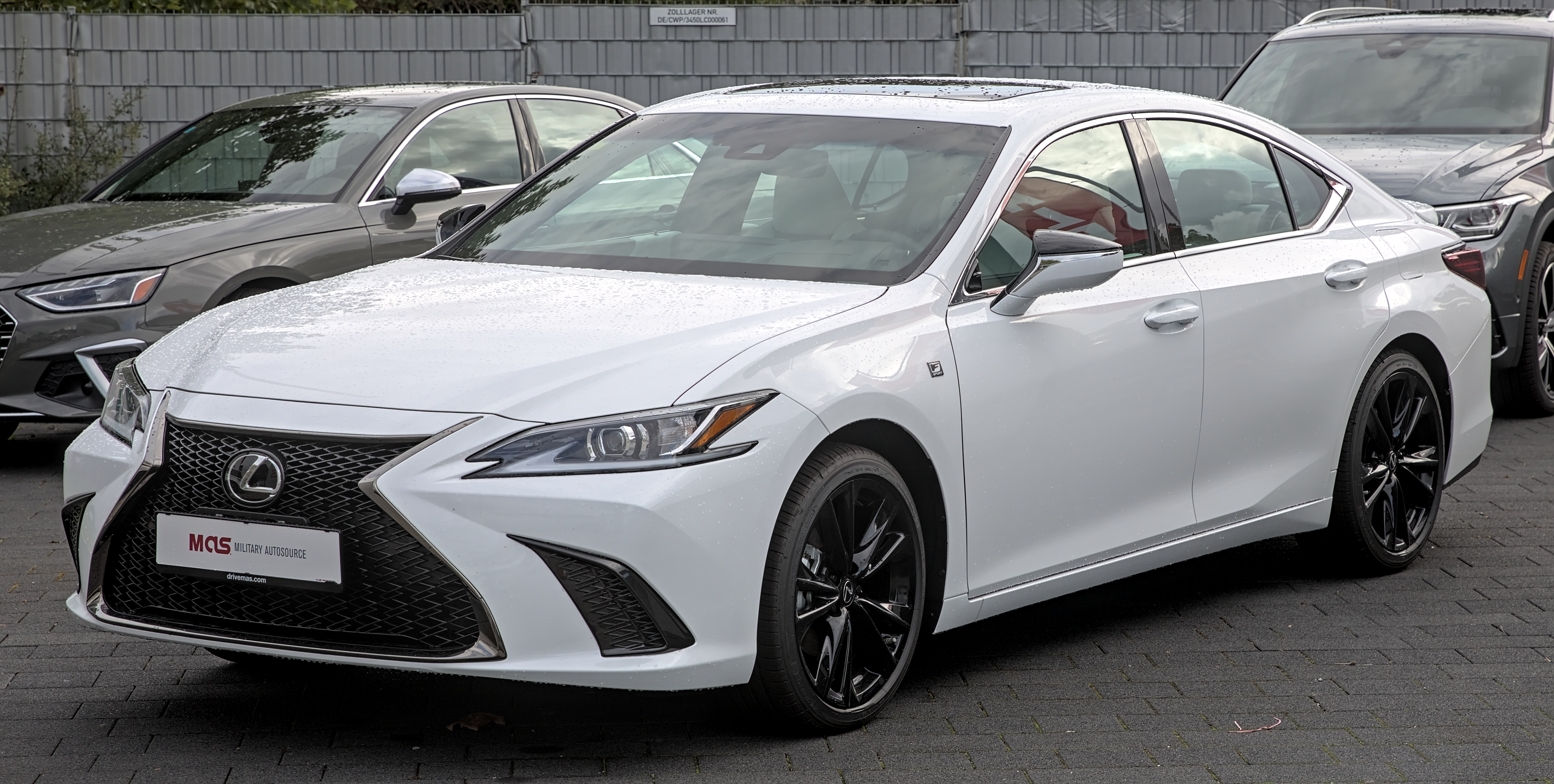
ES 350 (GSZ10; first facelift)

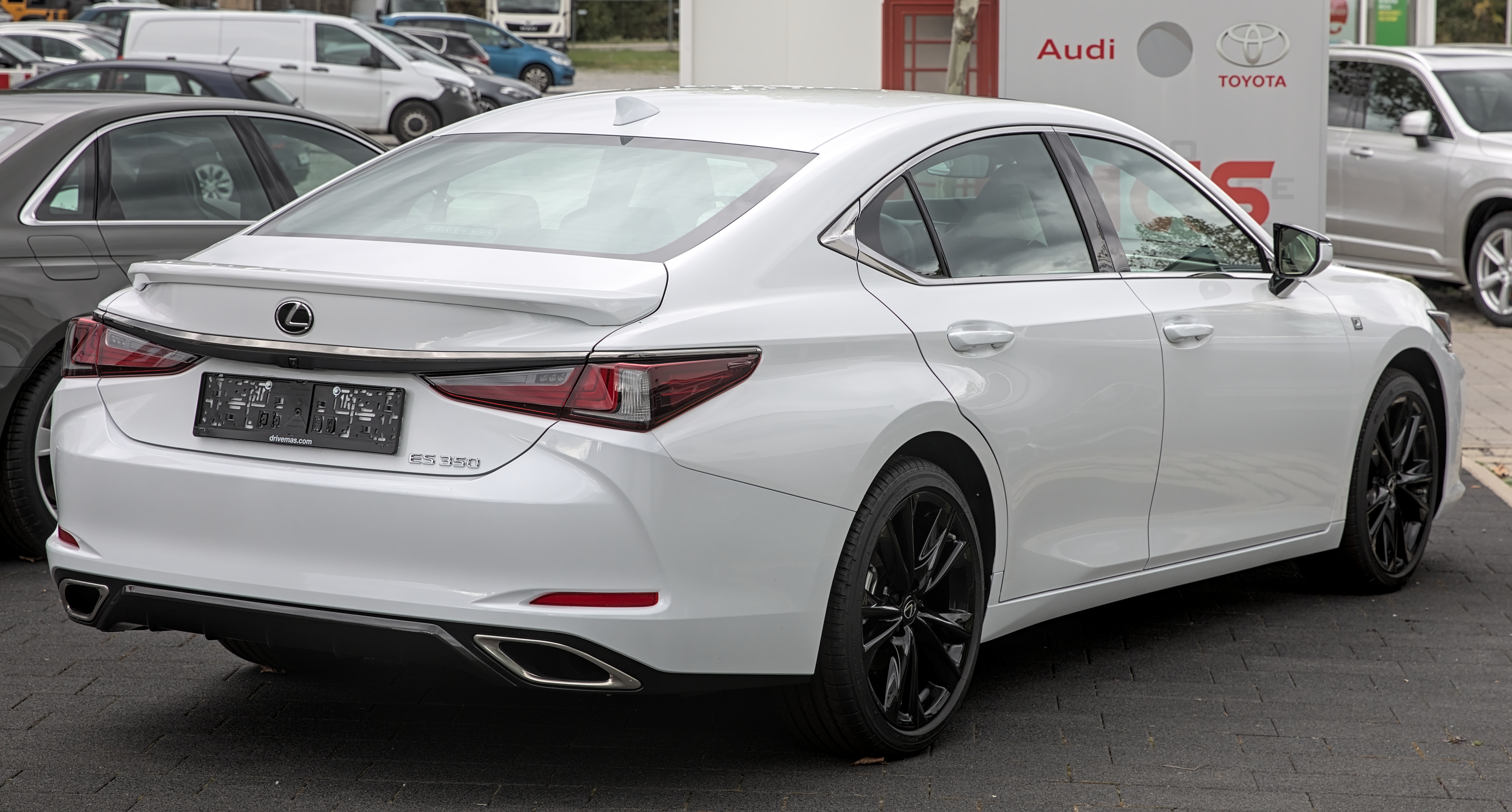
ES 350 (GSZ10; first facelift)

=== 2024 facelift ===
The second facelift model was unveiled on 15 November 2024, and is exclusive to the Chinese market. Changes includes an updated front fascia with new headlights and new grille design, updated rear fascia with new taillights combined with a full-width light bar, the Lexus logo replaced with the brand lettering on the boot lid, a redesigned rear bumper with the exhaust pipes hidden, and the interior receives a larger 14-inch touchscreen infotainment system and fewer physical controls.

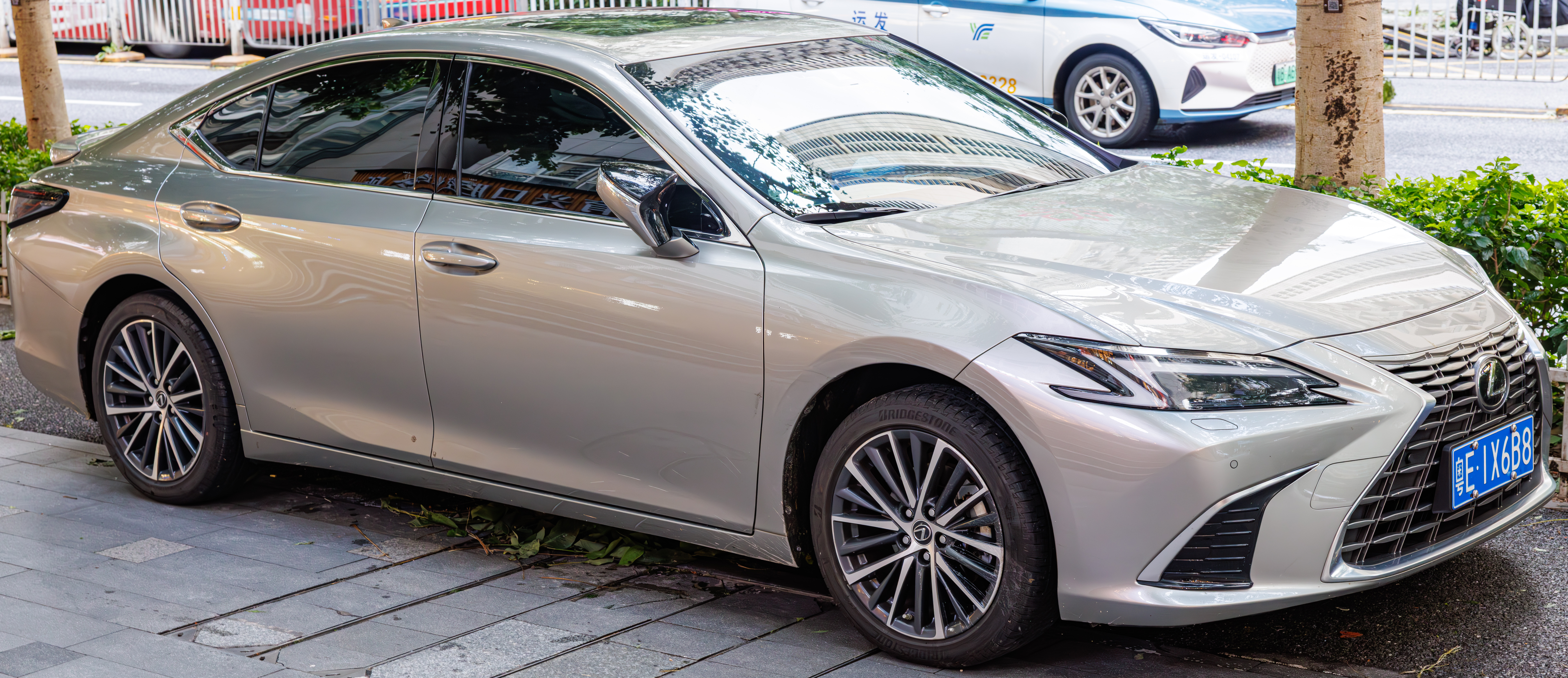
ES 300h (AXZH11; second facelift)

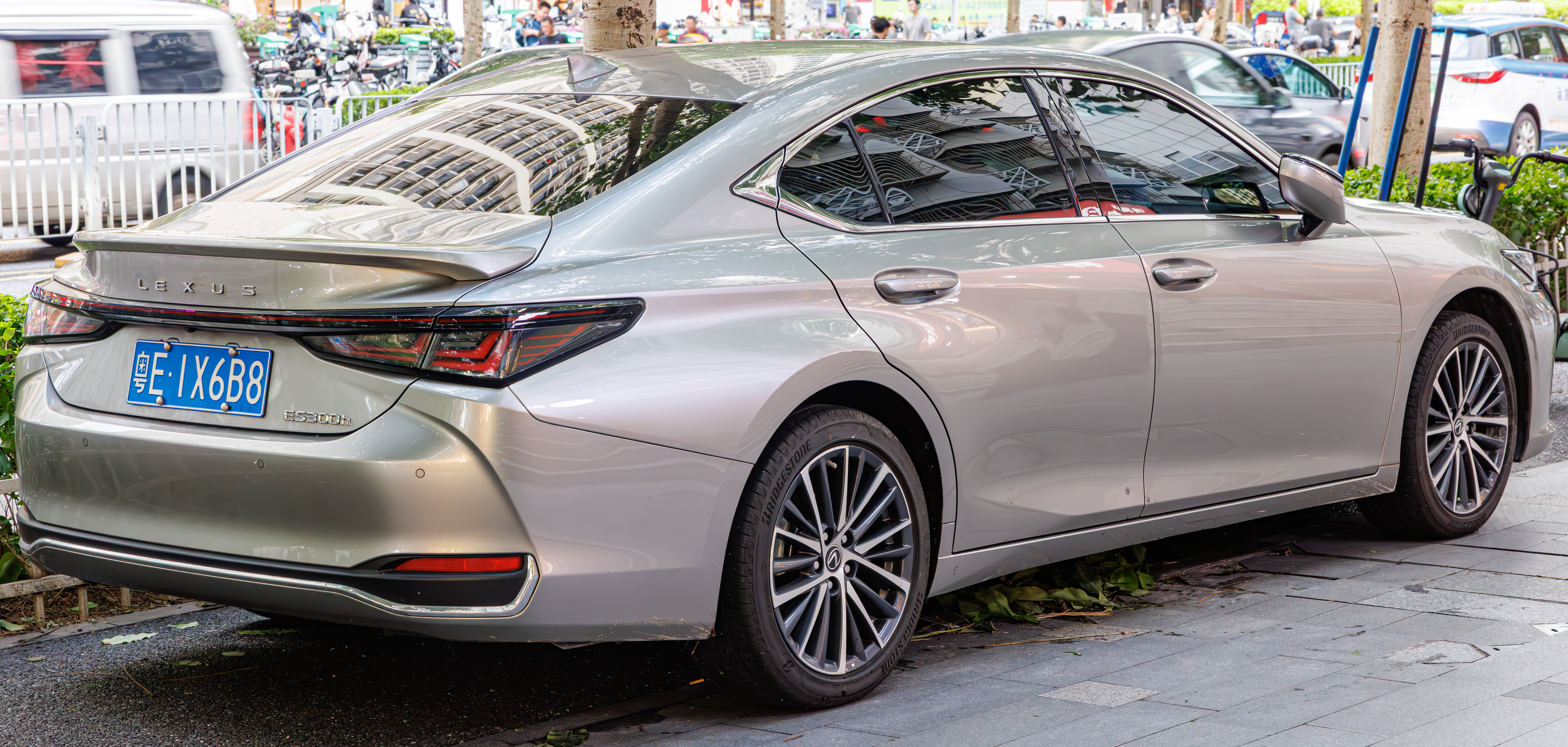
ES 300h (AXZH11; second facelift)

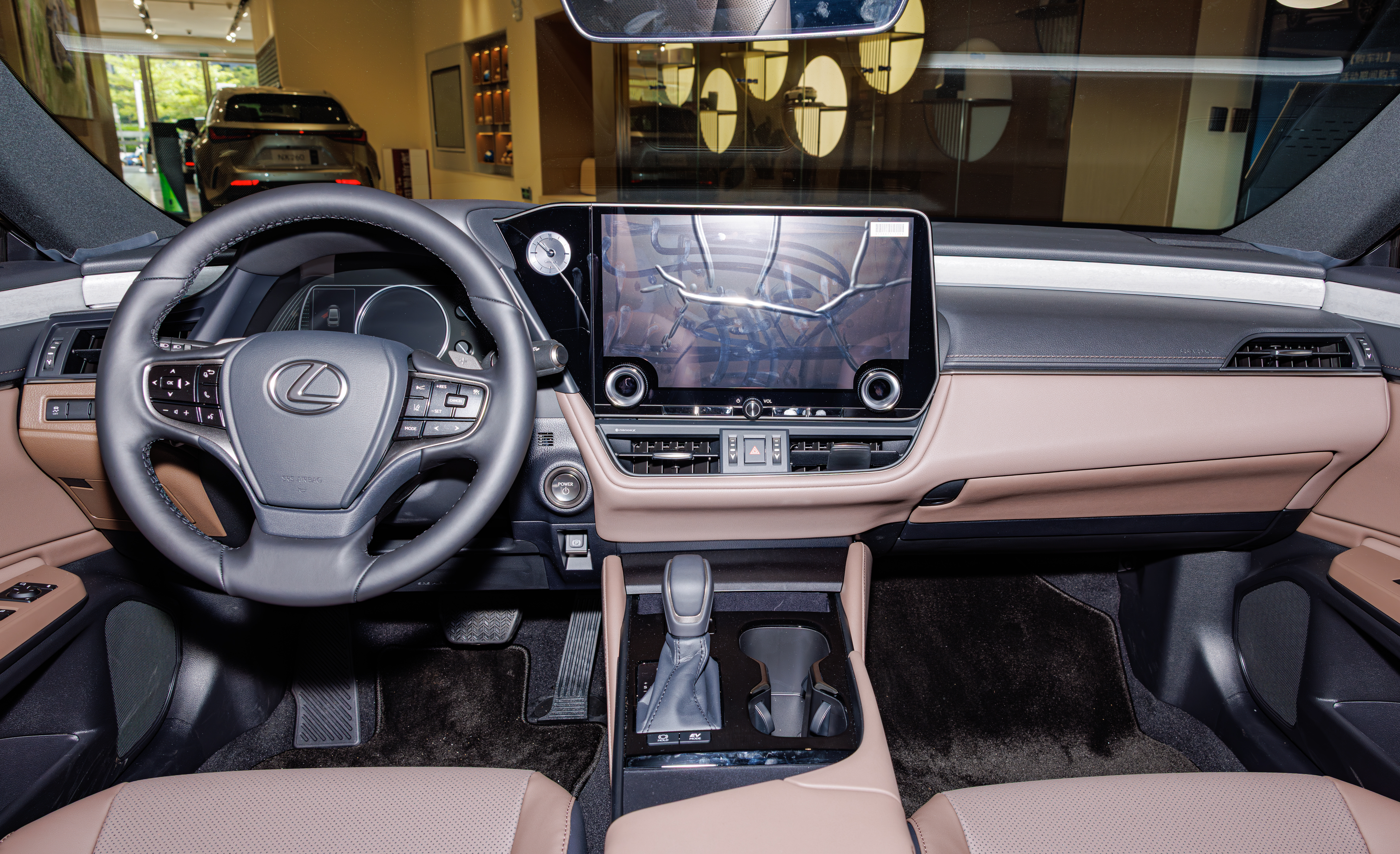
ES 300h Interior (AXZH11; second facelift)

=== Safety ===
ANCAP test results* Lexus 300h variants (2018, aligned with Euro NCAP)
Test	Points	%
Overall:	5 /5 stars	
Adult occupant:	34.7	91%
Child occupant:	42.2	86%
Pedestrian:	43.6	90%
Safety assist:	9.9	76%

ANCAP test results* Lexus ES all variants (2018, aligned with Euro NCAP)
Test	Points	%
Overall:	5 /5 stars	
Adult occupant:	34.7	91%
Child occupant:	42.2	86%
Pedestrian:	43.6	90%
Safety assist:	9.9	76%

== Eighth generation (XZ20; 2025) ==
Eighth generation
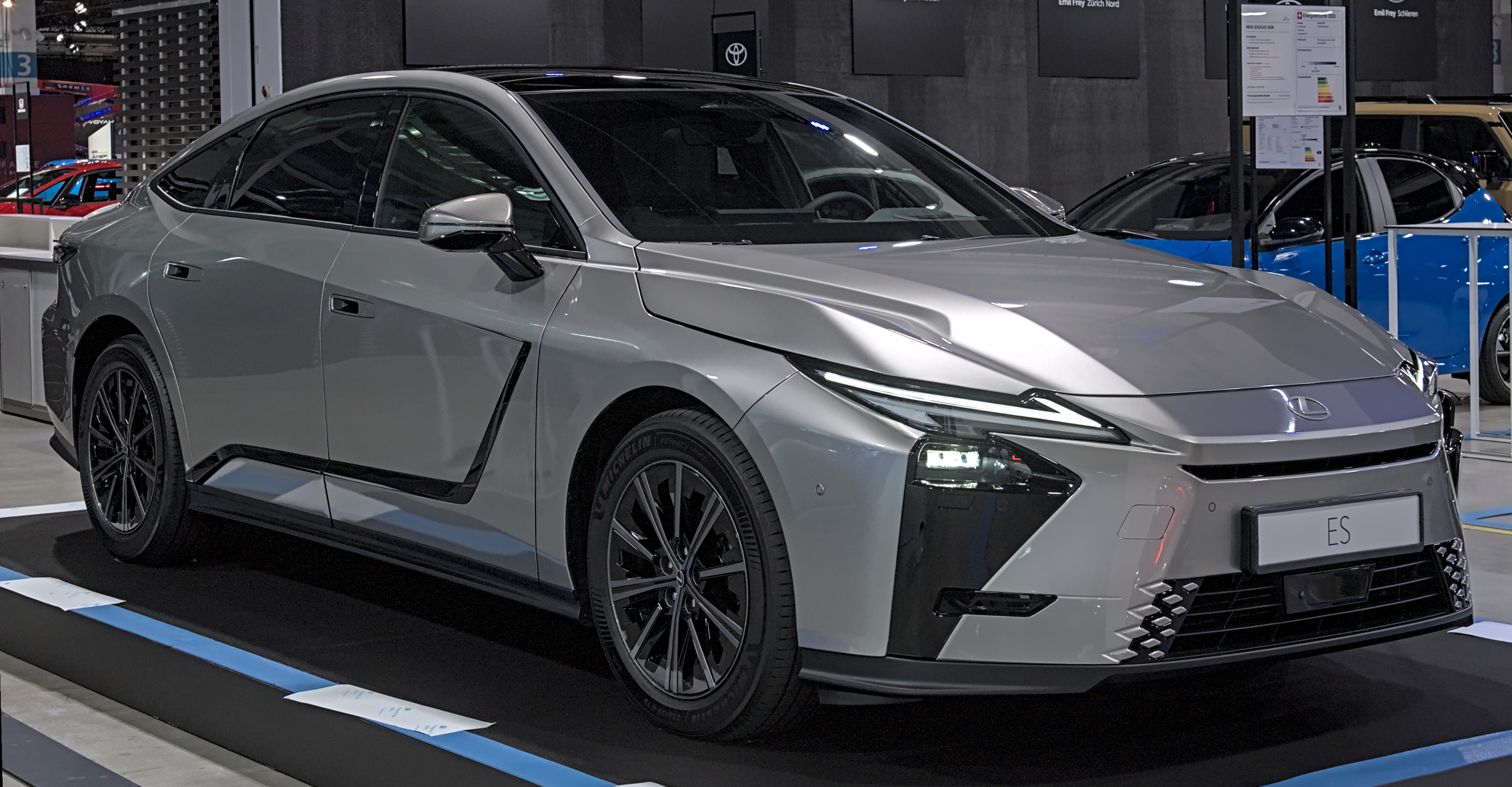
- 2025 Lexus ES 350h (AXZH21)

Overview
- Model code: XZ20
- Production: December 2025 – present
- Model years: 2026–present
- Assembly: Japan: Miyawaka, Fukuoka (TMK); India: Bidadi, Karnataka (CKD, TKMPL)
- Designer: Yahiko Kumai

Body and chassis
- Body style: 4-door sedan
- Layout: Front-engine, front-wheel-drive (ES 300h/350h); Front-engine, four-wheel-drive (ES 300h/350h); Front-motor, front-wheel-drive (ES 350e); Dual-motor, all-wheel-drive (ES 500e)
- Platform: TNGA: GA-K
- Related: Toyota Crown Crossover (S235); Toyota Camry (XV80); Lexus RZ

Powertrain
- Engine: Gasoline hybrid: 2.0 L M20A-FXS I4 (ES 300h); 2.5 L A25A-FXS I4 (ES 350h, AXZH21/26)
- Electric motor: Front-wheel-drive hybrid: 1× 119 kW (160 hp; 162 PS) 2VM AC permanent magnet synchronous (ES 350h); All-wheel-drive hybrid: 1× 119 kW (160 hp; 162 PS) 2VM front and 1× 41 kW (55 hp; 56 PS) 4NM rear AC permanent magnet synchronous (ES 350h AWD); Front-wheel-drive EV: 1× 167 kW (224 hp; 227 PS) 2XM AC permanent magnet synchronous (ES 350e, XXZM21); All-wheel-drive EV: 1× 167 kW (224 hp; 227 PS) 2XM front and 1× 88 kW (118 hp; 120 PS) 3XM rear AC permanent magnet synchronous (ES 500e, XXZM26)
- Power output: 145–148 kW (194–198 hp; 197–201 PS) (ES 300h, combined system output); 182 kW (244 hp; 247 PS) (ES 350h, combined system output); 165 kW (221 hp; 224 PS) (ES 350e); 252 kW (338 hp; 343 PS) (ES 500e)
- Transmission: eCVT (ES 300h/350h); eAxle (ES 350e/500e)
- Hybrid drivetrain: Power-split (ES 300h/350h)
- Battery: 1 kWh lithium-ion (ES 300h/350h); 74.69 – 77.4 kWh PPES NMC (ES 350e/500e)
- Electric range: 670 km (416 mi) (ES 350e) (WLTC); 620 km (385 mi) (ES 350e) (NEDC); 685 km (426 mi) (ES 350e) (CLTC); 636 km (395 mi) (ES 500e) (WLTC); 610 km (379 mi) (ES 500e) (CLTC)
- Plug-in charging: 3–6 kW (AC); 50–150 kW (DC)

Dimensions
- Wheelbase: 2,950 mm (116.1 in)
- Length: 5,140 mm (202.4 in)
- Width: 1,920 mm (75.6 in)
- Height: 1,555–1,560 mm (61.2–61.4 in)
- Curb weight: 1,785–2,285 kg (3,935–5,038 lb)

The eighth-generation ES was unveiled on 23 April 2025 at the 2025 Auto Shanghai. While most markets will receive ES models built in Japan, Lexus has announced production will also occur at a new plant near Shanghai for the Chinese market. This will be the first Lexus made in China. The Chinese Lexus factory will be the second wholly foreign-owned plant in China. American models will be once again sourced from Japan as the Georgetown plant will shift back exclusively to Camry and RAV4 production.

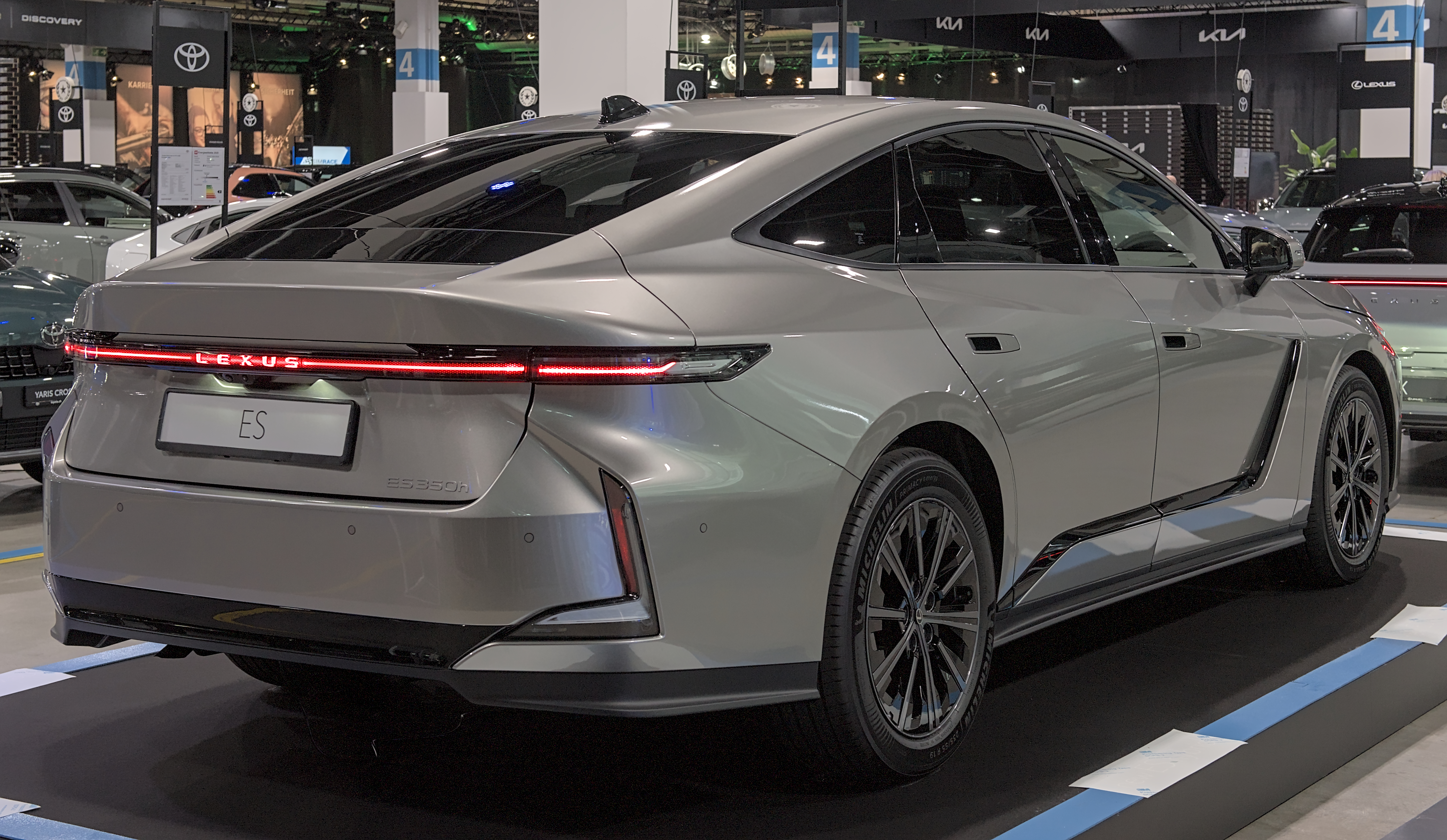
Rear view

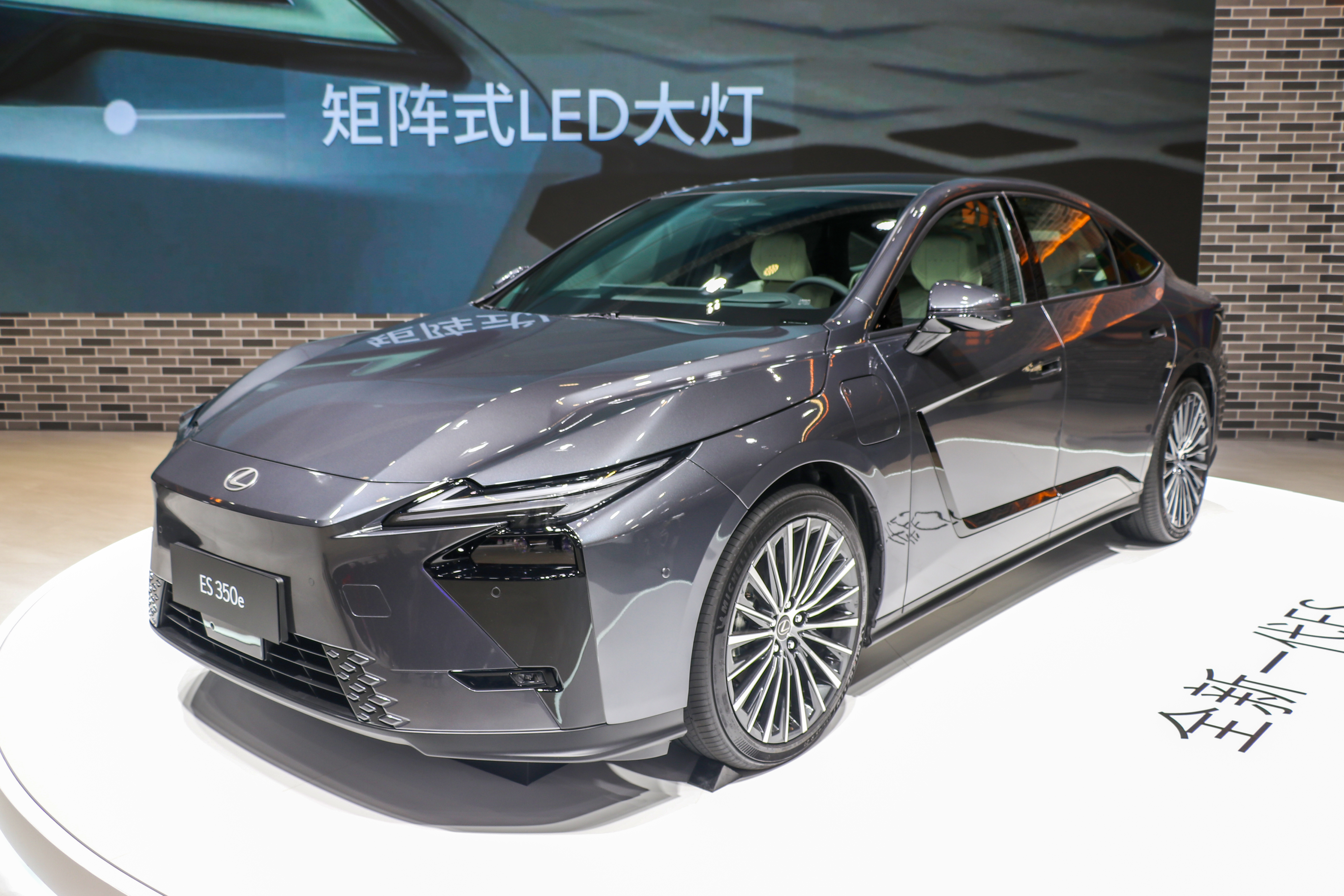
Lexus ES 350e

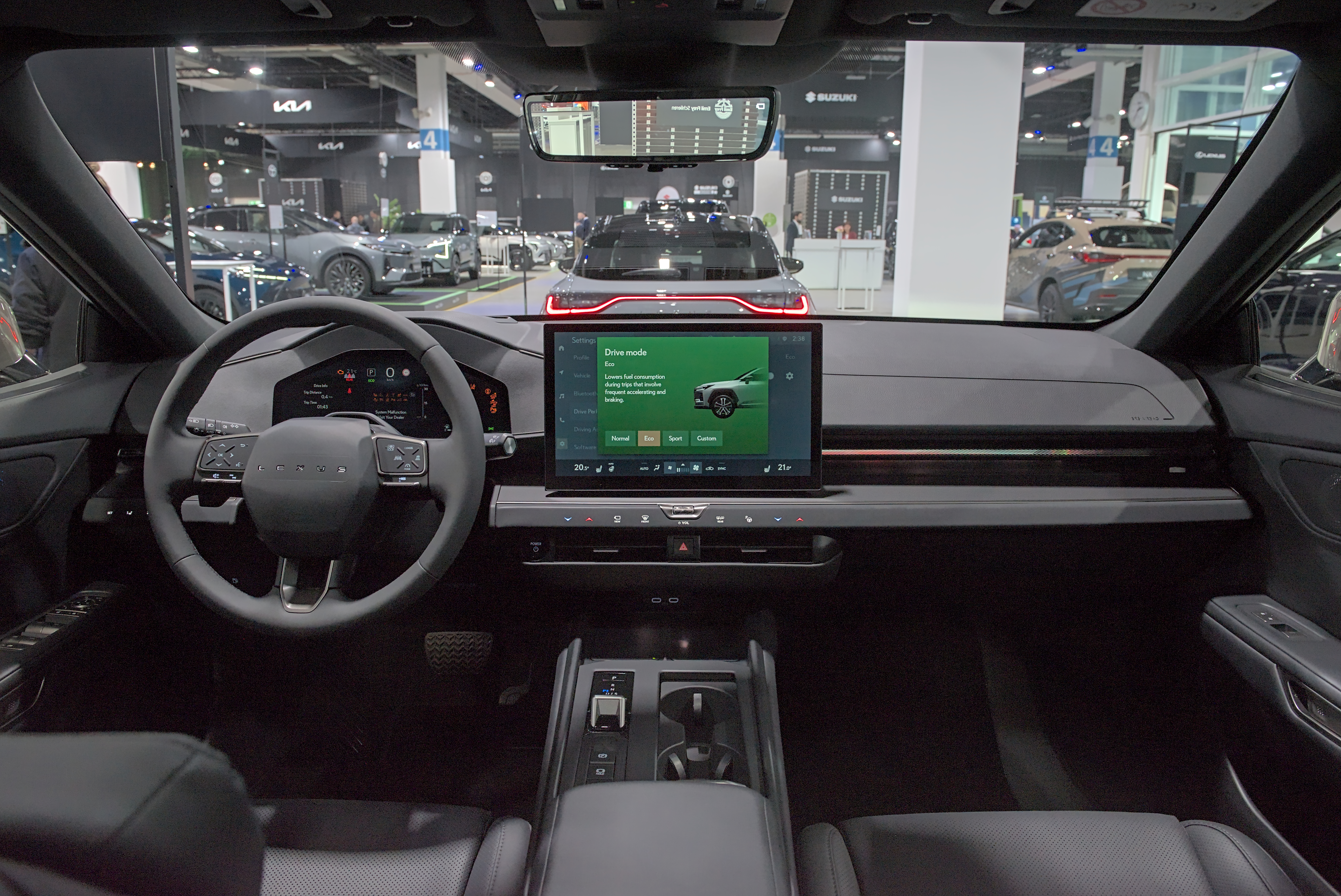
Interior

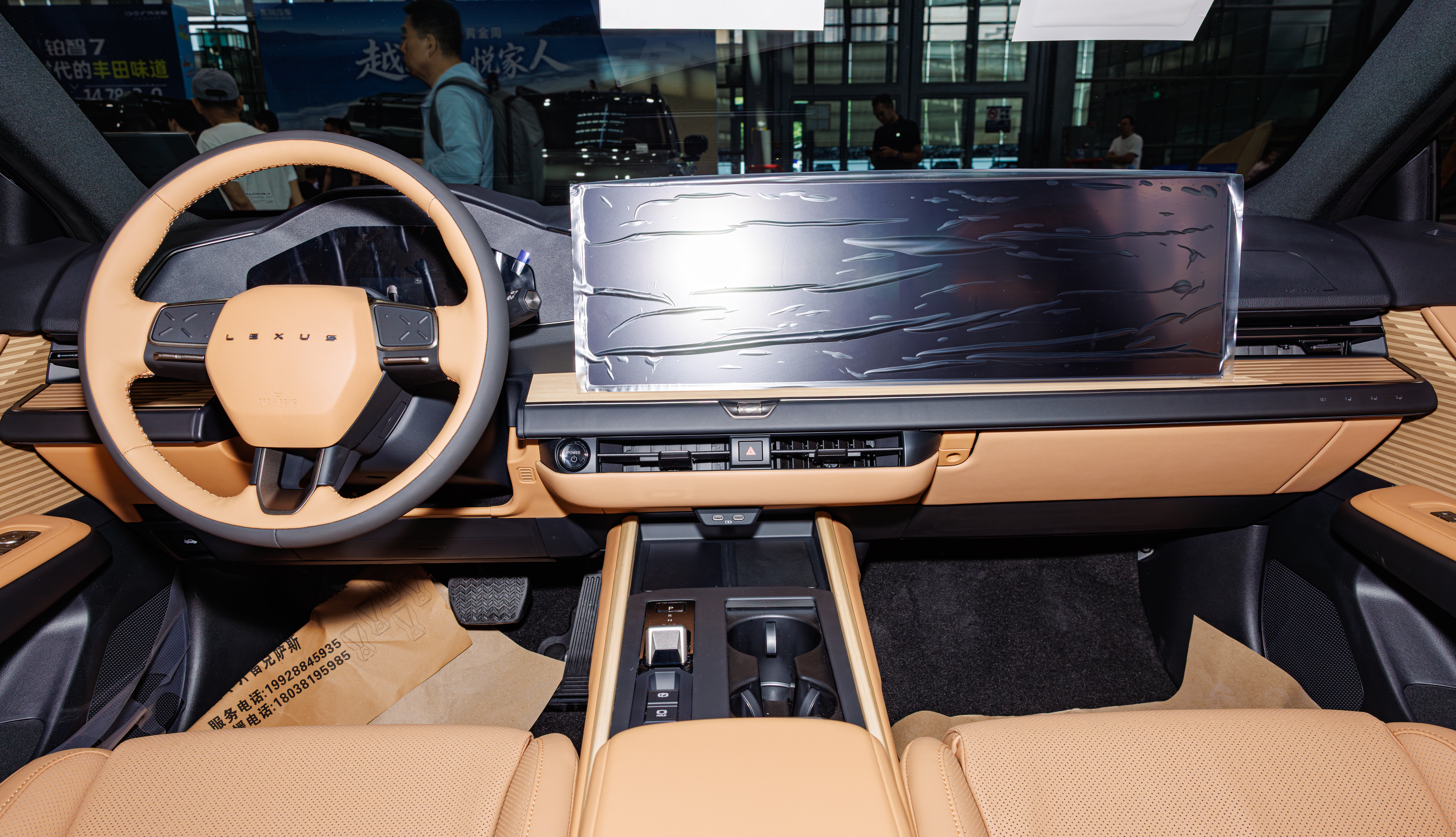
Interior (China)

=== Design ===
==== Exterior ====
The exterior design of the production model is inspired from the LF-ZC concept that was previewed at the 2023 Japan Mobility Show and developed with the brand's "Clean Tech x Elegance" design concept. The front fascia features Twin-L LED daytime running lights, spindle-shaped front graphics, the hybrid model features a grille with upper apertures needed for engine cooling, and smaller headlights which are integrated into the blacked-out bumper trim pieces. The side has a fastback profile with a "trunkless" look, it features a six-window design and an embedded L-shaped graphic that connects the shoulder line to the side sills. The rear fascia has full-width taillights, L-shaped signature lights in the bumper corners, and Lexus lettering which is also illuminated on the trunk lid.

For the suspension, MacPherson struts used for the front and a multi-link setup for the rear.

==== Interior ====
Inside, the interior is based on the brand's "Clean Tech x Elegance" design concept and is based on Lexus’ Tazuna principle. The dashboard uses bamboo layering with 3D printing and see-through ambient lighting on the door cards which are two first features for the brand. The interior has a 12.3-inch digital instrument cluster, a 14-inch LexusConnect touchscreen multimedia system, an optional passenger touchscreen display, the steering wheel uses embossed Lexus branding instead of the logo, a gear selector used for automatic transmission instead of a gear lever, and the brand's first Hidden Tech switches used for temperature controls and certain vehicular functions mounted below the central display which illuminates when the driver switches on the vehicle. Other interior features includes a Mark Levinson surround sound system, an Ottoman leg support for the rear seat behind the front passenger, a panoramic glass roof, a power forward-folding function for the front passenger seat to increase rear legroom and a reclining option for the rear seats.

=== Safety ===
The ES comes with the Lexus Safety System+ of driving assistance features such as Adaptive Cruise Control (ACC), Blind Spot Monitor (BSM), Driver Emergency Response System, Driver Monitor System, High-definition Adaptive High-beam System, Lane Departure Alert (LDA) and Pre-Collision Safety (PCS).

=== Markets ===
==== India ====
On 20 March 2026, Lexus introduced the eighth-generation ES 350e in India; the hybrid powertain was later introduced on 15 July 2026. Both of the vehicles are locally assembled, and are available in Exquisite and Luxury trims.

==== Asia ====
The eighth-generation ES was unveiled in Indonesia at the Gaikindo Indonesia International Auto Show in July 2026. Both of the powertrains are offered in the sole Luxury trim.

The eighth-generation ES was unveiled in the Philippine market on 6 August 2026. The ES 350h is sold in two trims, Executive and Luxury. The electric ES 350e is sold as the sole variant.

The eighth-generation ES was unveiled in Thailand market on 13 August 2026. The ES 350h is sold as the sole Grand Luxury trim, and the electric ES 350e is sold as the sole Premium trim.

The eighth-generation ES was launched in Brunei on 18 September 2026, the ES 350h is offered only in single trim: Luxury.

== Sales and production ==
In 2020 and 2021, the ES was the best-selling import car in China by a large margin.

Year	Sales		Global production
Year	US (hybrid)	China	Global production
1989	4,728		
1990	20,728		
1991	22,476		
1992	39,652		
1993	35,655		
1994	39,108		
1995	41,508		
1996	44,773		
1997	58,430		
1998	48,644		
1999	45,860		
2000	41,320		
2001	44,847		
2002	71,450		91,209
2003	65,762		82,025
2004	75,916		93,004
2005	67,577		79,422
2006	75,987		87,271
2007	82,867		121,286
2008	64,135		99,400
2009	48,485		74,481
2010	48,652		89,212
2011	40,873		
2012	56,158		
2013	72,581		
2014	72,508		
2015	64,969		
2016	58,299		
2017	51,398		
2018	48,484		
2019	51,336 (9,073)		
2020	43,292 (8,784)	114,641	
2021	45,406 (12,990)	105,844	
2022	41,735 (13,607)	98,439	
2023	39,117 (12,677)	110,100	
2024	43,156 (18,481)	108,015	
2025	39,926 (16,063)	118,570	

== Technical specifications ==
Drivetrain specifications by generation
Generation	Year(s)	Model name	Engine	Transmission	Power	Torque
First	1989–1991	ES 250	2.5 L V6	4-speed AT or 5-speed MT	116 kW (156 hp) @ 5600 rpm	220 N⋅m (160 lb⋅ft) @ 4400 rpm
Second	1991–1996	ES 300	3.0 L V6	4-speed AT or 5-speed MT	138 kW (185 hp) @ 5600 rpm	264 N⋅m (195 lb⋅ft) @ 4400 rpm
Third	1996–2001	ES 300	3.0 L V6	4-speed AT	150 kW (200 hp) @ 5600 rpm	290 N⋅m (210 lb⋅ft) @ 4400 rpm
Fourth	2001–2003	ES 300	3.0 L V6	5-speed AT	160 kW (210 hp) @ 5600 rpm	300 N⋅m (220 lb⋅ft) @ 4400 rpm
Fourth	2003–2006	ES 330	3.3 L V6	5-speed AT	168 kW (225 hp) @ 5600 rpm	330 N⋅m (240 lb⋅ft) @ 3600 rpm
Fifth	2006–2012	ES 350	3.5 L V6	6-speed AT	203 kW (272 hp) @ 6200 rpm	346 N⋅m (255 lb⋅ft) @ 4700 rpm
Fifth	2010–2012	ES 240	2.4 L I4	5-speed AT	123 kW (165 hp) @ 6000 rpm	224 N⋅m (165 lb⋅ft) @ 4000 rpm
Sixth	2012–2018	ES 250	2.5 L I4	6-speed AT	135 kW (181 hp) @ 6000 rpm	245 N⋅m (181 lb⋅ft) @ 4100 rpm
Sixth	2012–2018	ES 300h	2.5 L I4 (hybrid)	eCVT	149 kW (200 hp) @ 5700 rpm	Not stated
Sixth	2012–2018	ES 350	3.5 L V6	6-speed AT	203 kW (272 hp) @ 6200 rpm	345 N⋅m (254 lb⋅ft) @ 4700 rpm
Sixth	2015–2018	ES 200	2.0 L I4	6-speed AT	123 kW (165 hp) @ 6500 rpm	199 N⋅m (147 lb⋅ft) @ 4600 rpm
Seventh	2018–present	ES 200	2.0 L I4	CVT	129 kW (173 hp) @ 6600 rpm	206 N⋅m (152 lb⋅ft) @ 4,400–4,900 rpm
Seventh	2018–present	ES 250/ES 260	2.5 L I4	8-speed AT	152 kW (204 hp) @ 6600 rpm	247 N⋅m (182 lb⋅ft) @ 5000 rpm
Seventh	2018–present	ES 300h	2.5 L I4 (hybrid)	eCVT	160 kW (210 hp) @ 5700 rpm	221 N⋅m (163 lb⋅ft) @ 3600 rpm
Seventh	2018–present	ES 350	3.5 L V6	8-speed AT	225 kW (302 hp) @ 6600 rpm	362 N⋅m (267 lb⋅ft) @ 4700 rpm
Seventh	2018–present	ES 200	2.0 L I4	6-speed AT	123 kW (165 hp) @ 6500 rpm	199 N⋅m (147 lb⋅ft) @ 4600 rpm

== Awards ==
- U.S. News & World Report named the 2009 ES 350 the Best Upscale Car for the Money.
- Consumer Reports named the ES 350 the highest ranked upscale/large car in reliability in its 2006 annual car survey.
- The Canadian Car of the Year Awards (selected by the Automobile Journalists Association of Canada) gave the ES 350 its Best New Luxury Car (under $50k) Award in 2007.
- J.D. Power and Associates named the ES 300 the best entry luxury car in Initial Quality in 1996, 1998, 2000, 2001, 2003 and 2006.
- Intellichoice gave the ES 330 the Best Overall Value Award in the Near Luxury Segment in 2004, 2005, and 2007.
- Kelley Blue Book gave the ES its Best to Hold Value Award in 1998 and 2001.
- J.D. Power named the ES as one of the Top Ten in Initial Quality in 1991, 1993, and 1994.
- The ES series was named most appealing entry luxury car by J.D. Power and Associates in 1997, 2001 and 2007.
- Kiplinger's Personal Finance report named the ES Best in Class for the over $30,000 segment in 1993, and the ES was a Top Pick in 2007.
- Automobile Magazine named the ES one of its Top Ten All-Stars in 1992.
