= Index of Japan-related articles (W–X) =

This page lists Japan-related articles with romanized titles beginning with the letters W and X. For names of people, please list by surname (i.e., "Tarō Yamada" should be listed under "Y", not "T"). Please also ignore particles (e.g. "a", "an", "the") when listing articles (i.e., "A City with No People" should be listed under "City").

== Wa ==
- W3m
- Wa (Japan)
- Wabi-sabi
- Wachi, Kyoto
- Wadayama, Hyōgo
- Wado Ryu
- Wadomari, Kagoshima
- Wajiki, Tokushima
- Wajima, Ishikawa
- Waka (poetry)
- Wakamiya, Fukuoka
- Wakasa Province
- Wakasa, Tottori
- Koichi Wakata
- Wakatsuki Reijirō
- Bokusui Wakayama
- Wakayama Prefecture
- Wakayama, Wakayama
- Wake District, Okayama
- Wake, Okayama
- Waki, Tokushima
- Waki, Yamaguchi
- Wakizashi
- Wakkanai, Hokkaidō
- Wakō, Saitama
- Walkman
- Wall of 1.03 million yen and 1.30 million yen
- Waluigi
- Wanouchi, Gifu
- Warabi, Saitama
- Wards of Japan
- Warichi
- Wario
- Wario's Woods
- Wario Land II
- Wario Land 3
- Wario Land 4
- WarioWare (series)
- WarioWare, Inc.: Mega Microgame$!
- WarioWare, Inc.: Mega Party Game$!
- WarioWare: Touched!
- WarioWare: Twisted!
- WarioWare: Smooth Moves
- Wario World
- Wasabi
- Wasabi (film)
- Waseda University
- Kazumi Watanabe
- Ken Watanabe (actor)
- On Watanabe
- Yoshinori Watanabe
- Watarai District, Mie
- Watarai, Mie
- Yuu Watase
- Water supply and sanitation in Japan
- Wazuka, Kyoto

== We–Wi ==
- Weekly Shonen Jump
- Welcome to Pia Carrot
- West Japan Railway Company
- White Day
- Whiteout (2000 film)
- White Plum Asanga
- William Adams (sailor)
- William S. Clark
- Wind: A Breath of Heart
- Winny
- Wish (manga)
- Witch Hunter Robin

== Wo–Wr ==
- Wolf's Rain
- Women in Japan
- Wonder Boy
- Wonder Boy in Monster Land
- WonderSwan
- WonderSwan Color
- Wooden fish
- World Domination (Band-Maid album)
- World Record (The Animatrix)
- World War II
- WOWOW
- Wrecking Crew (video game)

== X ==
- X (manga)
- X Japan
- X-Day (manga)
- Francis Xavier
- Xenogears
- Xenosaga
- xxxHolic
