= Toyota Motor Kyushu =

Japanese subsidiary company

Toyota Motor Kyushu, Inc.
- Native name: トヨタ自動車九州株式会社
- Romanized name: Toyota Jidōsha Kyūshū Kabushiki-gaisha
- Type: Subsidiary
- Industry: Automotive
- Founded: February 8, 1991; 35 years ago
- Headquarters: Miyawaka, Japan
- Key people: Osamu Nagata (President)
- Products: Cars, engines, hybrid systems
- Production output: ▼335,910 vehicles (FY2022)
- Revenue: ▼¥1,118.07 billion (FY2022)
- Operating income: ▼¥0.75 billion (FY2022)
- Net income: ▼¥0.73 billion (FY2022)
- Total assets: ▲¥405.22 billion (FY2022)
- Total equity: ▲¥95.88 billion (FY2022)
- Number of employees: About 10,600 (April 2023)
- Parent: Toyota Motor Corporation
- Website: www.toyota-kyushu.com
- Footnotes; Fiscal Year 2022 (FY2022) is from 1 April 2022 to 31 March 2023. References

Toyota Motor Kyushu (TMK) is a manufacturing subsidiary of Toyota established in 1991 and focused on the production of Lexus cars, engines, and hybrid systems. Its headquarters and single assembly plant are in the city of Miyawaka in Japan's Fukuoka Prefecture. Car production started in December 1992.

== History ==
=== Early years ===
In the late 1980s, at the peak of the Japanese asset price bubble, Toyota started to research the possibility of establishing a new vehicle assembly plant. At the time, most of its Japanese assembly sites were in and around the Aichi prefecture, and the company could not cope with the high demand for high-end mid-size cars it had in the domestic market, as it found difficult to hire enough workers for assembly work in Aichi. The labour shortage was also pushing wages up, reducing Toyota's competitiveness. Other reasons cited for the labour shortage were declining birthrates and lack of interest in new workers for "dirty, difficult, or dangerous" jobs. The Kyushu region was judged as the best option, as it had the Miyata Industrial Park, a site with an extensive transport infrastructure and space to build large facilities, as well as a workforce surplus. Toyota would also benefit from the "Rural Area Industry Introduction Promotion Law" which gave special exemptions of corporate tax for the first year, exemption of business tax for three years, and special property tax exemptions. Toyota decided to make the new plant a separate subsidiary but, unlike its previous subcontracting companies, it decided to make it so just from a legal perspective while de facto it would be a plant directly controlled by Toyota headquarters, without any significant autonomy. The reason for this was to fully take advantage of the tax breaks, to be able to pay lower salaries than the ones paid by the parent, and to be able to adapt easier the plant operations.

In July 1990, Toyota signed a land agreement with Fukuoka prefecture towns Miyata and Wakamiya. (Note: Both later merged to form Miyawaka.) On 1 February 1991, Toyota set up two groups to support the new Kyushu company: Kyushu Business Preparation Office, which selected production models for the plant and the Kyushu Support Group at the Motomachi plant. The manufacturing company, Toyota Motor Kyushu, was officially established on 8 February 1991 and a plant with a capacity to produce up to 200,000 vehicles per year, called the Miyata plant, was completed in December 1992. The plant was used to test a (new for Toyota) semi-automatised production system with its single assembly line divided into smaller autonomous sections and increased responsibility and input from workers. The Toyota Motor Kyushu system was later implemented in remodelled and brand-new Toyota plants, including the Motomachi No.2 plant (1994), Tahara No.1 plant (1995), Motomachi No.1 plant (1996) in Japan; Kentucky No.2 plant (1994) in the United States.

The company's first assembly was the production volume of the seventh-generation Mark II which formerly belonged to the Motomachi plant, sharing its production with Kanto Auto Works. In 1994, it also added the fifth-generation Chaser from Kanto Auto Works, which replaced it with a Crown taxi. In 1996, Toyota Motor Kyushu entered into production the eighth-generation Mark II.

When the Miyata plant started operations, the bubble had ended and the Japanese economy entered into a recession, which lowered the sales of the company's products. There also was a shift in demand, especially in overseas markets, which increasingly preferred sport utility vehicles (SUVs) and SUV-like vehicles over traditional cars. Toyota Motor Kyushu adapted its structure, making production systems more flexible and forming workers into a more multi-skilled approach. In 1997, as a result of these changes, the company could incorporate more varied products besides high-end rear wheel drive cars, ranging from the high-end front wheel drive saloon (third-generation Windom/Lexus ES) to the front wheel drive SUV-like (first-generation Harrier/Lexus RX). The first Lexus-badged products assembled in that year would also have a significant impact on the company, as that marque would increasingly be its main focus.

Toyota Motor Kyushu increased its importance within Toyota in the next few years, joining the Toyota Production System development group and, in 1998, designing a special version of the Harrier in partnership with Zagato.

In 2000, Toyota Motor Kyushu started producing the first-generation SUV-like front wheel/all wheel drive Highlander/Kluger. That same year, the company stopped assembling the Mark II, transferring its production to Kanto Auto Works. In 2001, it discontinued the Chaser, focusing from then on on front/all wheel drive vehicles. In 2002, it introduced the fourth-generation Windom/Lexus ES. In 2003, it began producing the second generation Harrier/RX.

=== Lexus focus ===
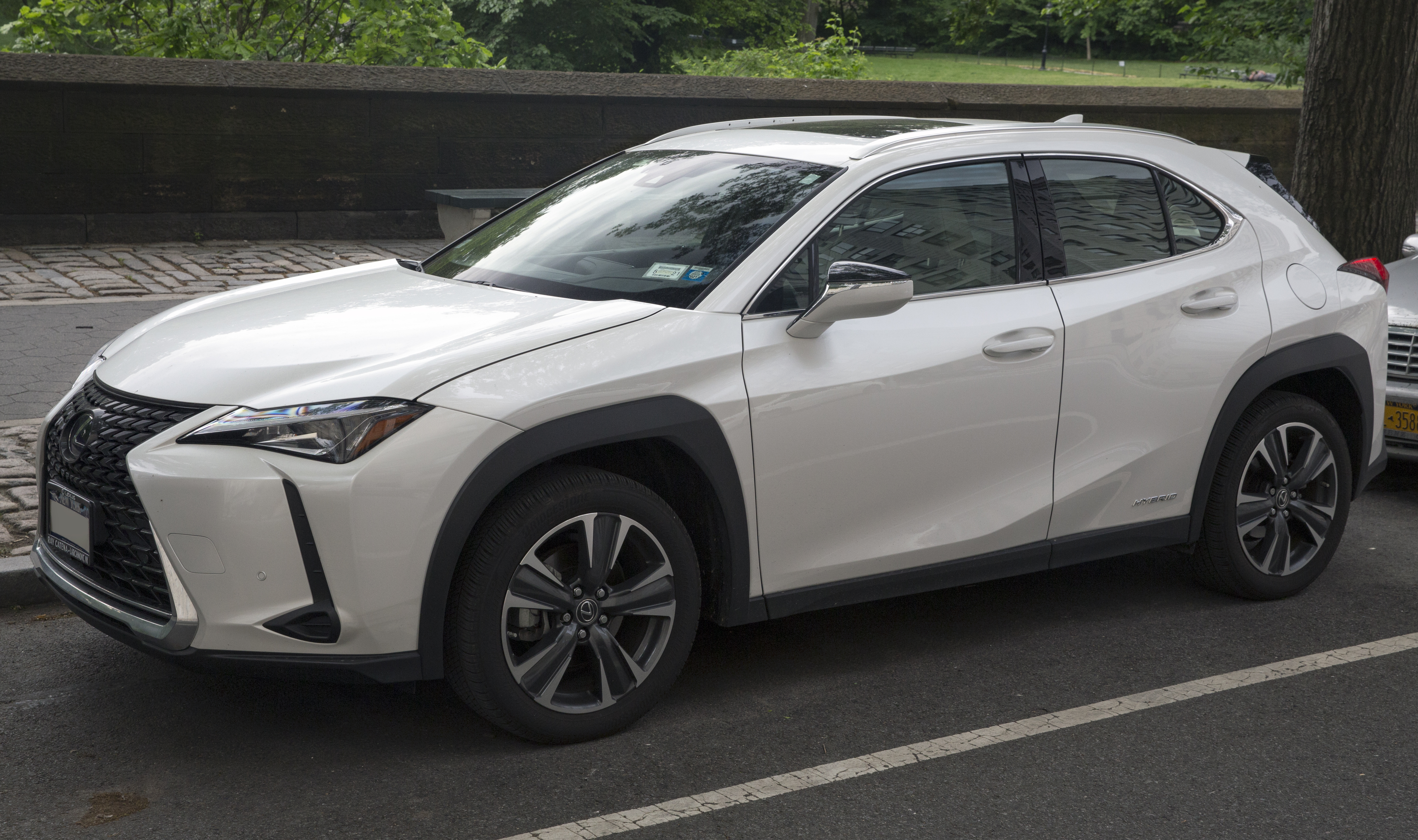
A Lexus UX

From 2005 onwards, the company would become an export-oriented producer of Lexus vehicles. In 2005, it opened a second assembly line for the Miyata plant focused exclusively on Lexus-badged vehicles, doubling the production capacity. In that year, it also introduced a Lexus vehicle for the new line (the second-generation IS) and hybrid systems, firstly on the second-generation RX and the Highlander. By the end of the year, the company opened an aluminium engine plant (Kanda plant), initially focused on the 2GR. In 2006, the company entered into production the fifth-generation Windom/Lexus ES. In 2007, it added the second-generation Highlander/Kluger. In that year, it began to do research and development work, mostly designing interior and exterior pieces. By the end of the year, the company achieved its largest annual car production, with 443,000 units. That number almost halved the next year because of the Lehman shock.

In 2008, Toyota Motor Kyushu started a second assembly line for the Kanda plant and opened its own hybrid systems plant, the Kokura plant. By the end of the year, it rolled off the third-generation Lexus RX. In 2009, it introduced the hybrid-only Lexus HS (HS250h) and its sister car, the Japan-only Sai. In 2010, the company transferred production of the non-hybrid Highlanders to Toyota Motor Manufacturing Indiana. In early 2011, Toyota Motor Kyushu entered into production the first-generation hybrid Lexus CT (CT200h). At the end of 2012, it stopped assembling the IS and the model production was moved to the Tahara plant. The convertible variant continued for some time at Kyushu for overseas markets.

In February 2012, Toyota said it would move all the remaining Highlander assembly from Toyota Motor Kyushu to Toyota Motor Manufacturing Indiana by 2013 to make it more competitive. In that year, Toyota Motor Kyushu launched the sixth-generation Lexus ES and discontinued HS production for the United States due to low sales. In 2014, the Lexus NX was put into production by the company. In 2015, it launched the fourth-generation Lexus RX. In 2018, the seventh-generation Lexus ES and the UX. That same year, it ended production of the HS.

=== Moving away from fossil fuels ===
In late 2019, Toyota Motor Kyushu rolled off the first Lexus-badged electric car (EV), the UX300e. In November 2021, it entered into production the second-generation Lexus NX (the first Lexus-badged plug-in hybrid vehicle), following parts procurement delays partially caused by the COVID-19 pandemic. The company is considering building an EV-only assembly line, as Toyota plans to phase out non-EV Lexus production by 2035.

In March 2022, Toyota said the Lexus CT production would be ended by October 2022.

In April 2023, Toyota Motor Kyushu and Kyushu University signed an agreement to jointly develop Fukuoka's seaweed beds in order to offset carbon emissions.

== Facilities ==
The Toyota Motor Kyushu's single vehicle assembly plant (Miyata plant) and headquarters are in Miyawaka, Fukuoka. The company has two more plants: the Kanda plant and the Kokura plant. The first is in Kanda, Fukuoka and produces engines. The second is in Kitakyushu (also Fukuoka) and produces hybrid systems. Average unit production capacity for each plant is 430,000, 440,000, and 470,000 respectively.

The Miyata plant is on a site two kilometres long and 850 metres wide and has two assembly lines (No.1 and No.2 plants), with body weld, paint, and assembly units. Both lines are supplied by common stamping, plastics, suspension, and fuel-tank sections within the plant. Miyata also has a hybrid component sub-assembly facility. The No.1 assembly line is slightly larger than the No.2 and they can produce about 1,000 and 850 cars per day respectively. Most of the production time (11 of 19 hours) is in the paint shop, as Lexus' cars have a very intensive coating process that includes water polishing. About 30% of the finished cars are rejected to comply with Lexus' quality standard.

The Kanda plant has two assembly lines and its building area is 108,000 square metres (m^{2}) (powertrain line 77,000 m^{2}, casting line 25,000 m^{2}, and smelting line 6,000 m^{2}). The Kokura plant has 32,000 m^{2}.

From 2016 onwards, the company has a research development facility (Technical Centre) separated from the rest of the Miyata plant operations.

== Current models ==
As of 2008, 90% of the company's production was exported overseas, mostly to the United States (65%).

As of 2023, the company produces the following Lexus vehicles at its Miyata plant:

- Lexus ES (1996–present)
- Lexus RX (1997–present)
- Lexus NX (2014–present)
- Lexus UX (2019–present)
- Lexus TZ (2026; upcoming)
