= Toyota Sai =

Mid-size hybrid sedan

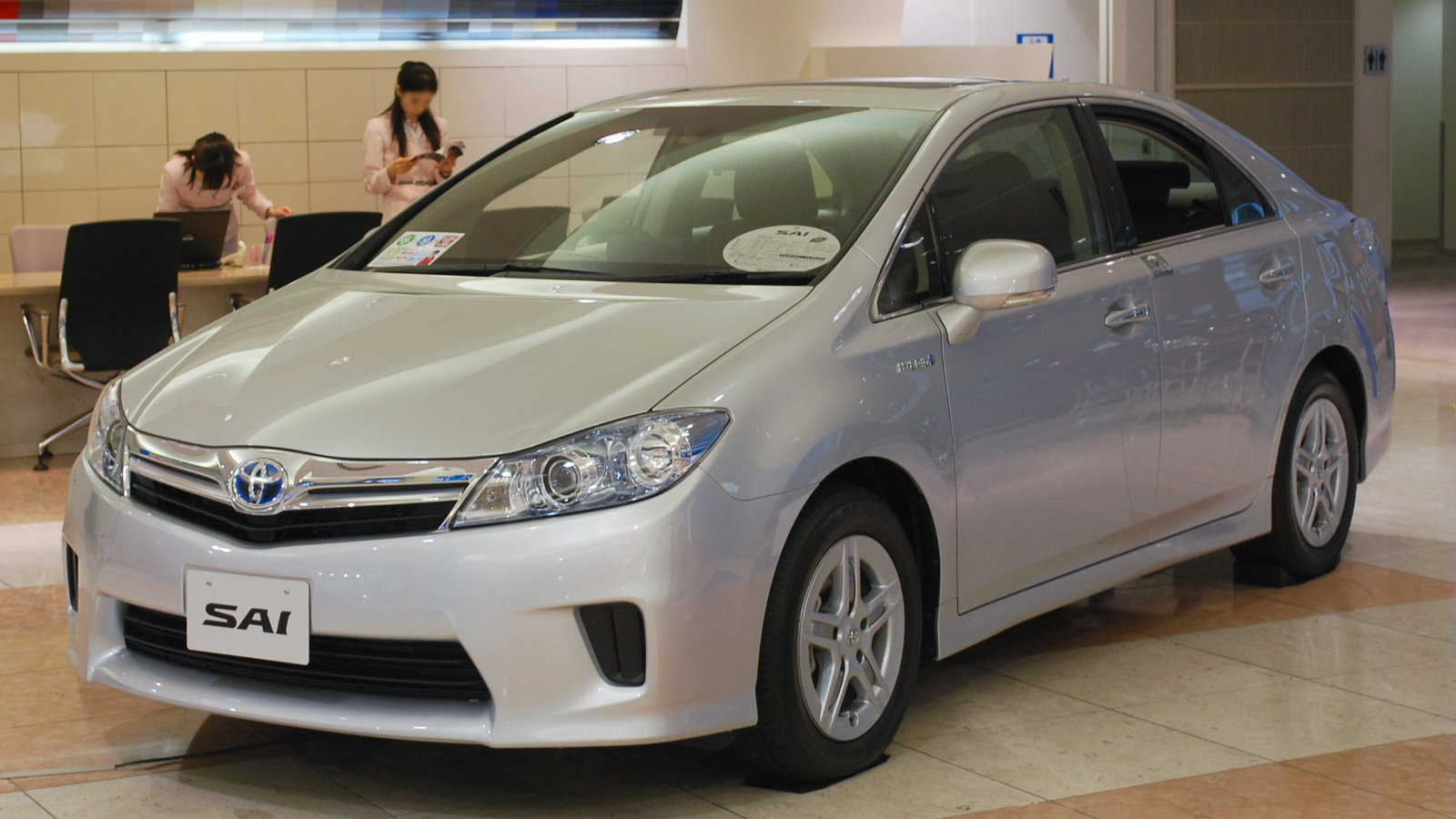

Overview
- Manufacturer: Toyota
- Model code: AZK10
- Production: 2009–2017
- Assembly: Japan: Miyawaka, Fukuoka (Toyota Motor Kyushu)

Body and chassis
- Class: Mid-size car
- Body style: 4-door sedan
- Layout: Front-engine, front-wheel-drive
- Platform: Toyota New MC platform
- Related: Toyota Avensis (T270); Lexus HS

Powertrain
- Engine: 2.4 L 2AZ-FXE petrol hybrid I4
- Electric motor: 2JM AC synchronous
- Power output: 110 kW (148 hp; 150 PS) (petrol engine); 140 kW (188 hp; 190 PS) (combined system output)
- Transmission: eCVT
- Battery: Nickel metal hydride

Dimensions
- Wheelbase: 2,700 mm (106.3 in)
- Length: 4,695 mm (184.8 in)
- Width: 1,770 mm (69.7 in)
- Height: 1,485 mm (58.5 in)
- Curb weight: 1,570–1,590 kg (3,461–3,505 lb)

Chronology
- Predecessor: Toyota Brevis/Progrès
- Successor: Lexus ES 300h (AXZH10)

The Toyota Sai is a hybrid electric car sharing the same platform and hybrid drivetrain as the Lexus HS. It was launched in Japan on October 20, 2009, following the launch of the Lexus HS in January of the same year. Toyota received about 14,000 orders in one month after its introduction, and the Sai is available at all Toyota Japanese dealership sales channels.

The Sai was released in December 2009 as Toyota's second hybrid-only line after the Prius as Toyota brand model. Positioned between the Prius and the Crown Hybrid, the Sai came in a semi-fastback 4-door sedan body with a trunk. It was a sister car of the Lexus HS 250h that was released earlier in July, and the two models shared the basic components although they were differentiated by their interior and exterior designs. The Sai's body length, width, and height were smaller than those of the Lexus HS 250h by 95 mm (3.7 in), 15 mm (0.59 in), and 10 mm (0.39 in), respectively.

== Design ==
The highly aerodynamic body design extended even to the flat and smooth underfloor covers, attaining a drag coefficient of 0.27 which was among the best in its class. Although the Sai employed the Toyota Hybrid System (THS) II with a reduction gear mechanism (the same as that of the Prius), its engine was a more powerful 2.4-liter unit (2AZ-FXE) producing 150 PS, to which a 143 PS motor was combined to drive the front wheels. The fuel consumption was 23.0 km/L under the 10–15 test cycle.

The name comes from the Japanese word "sai" -which means "talent" and "coloration" when written with the Kanji character.

== Development ==
In August 2013, the Sai received a thorough facelift. Headlights and taillights were more aggressive and stretched the entire width of the car, continuing the character line from the side of the car. Reprogramming the hybrid control unit also provided an increase in fuel economy on the test cycle.

On November 15, 2017, the Sai was discontinued and replaced by the Lexus ES 300h, which was released in Japan on October 24, 2018.

== Gallery ==
=== Pre-facelift ===
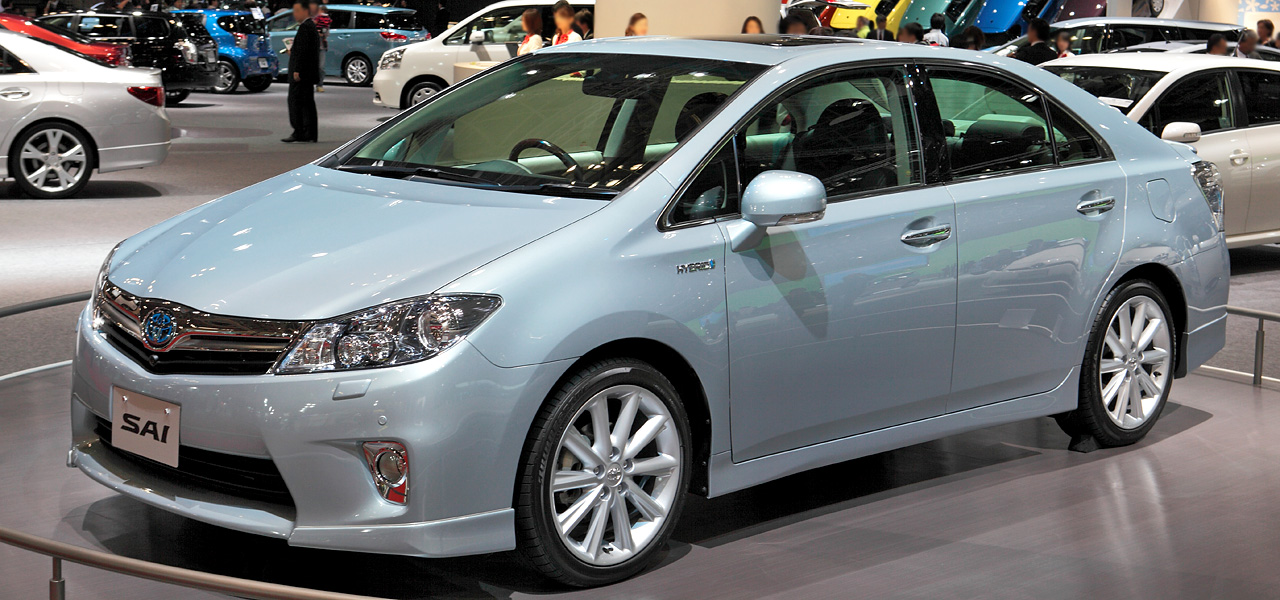
Front view

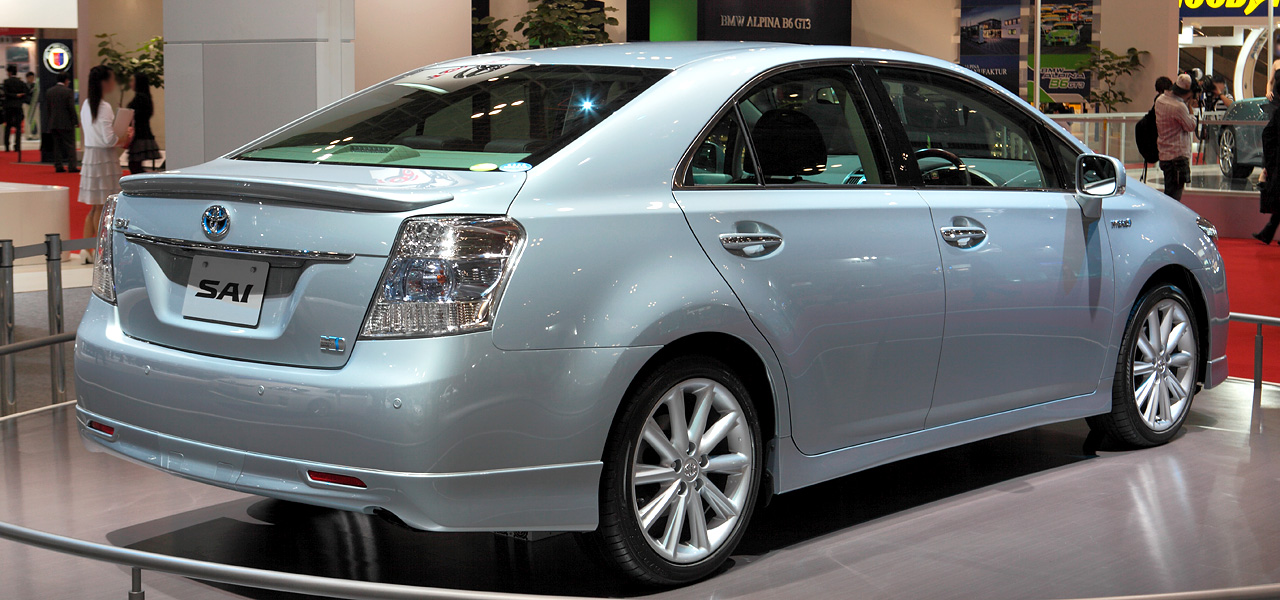
Rear view

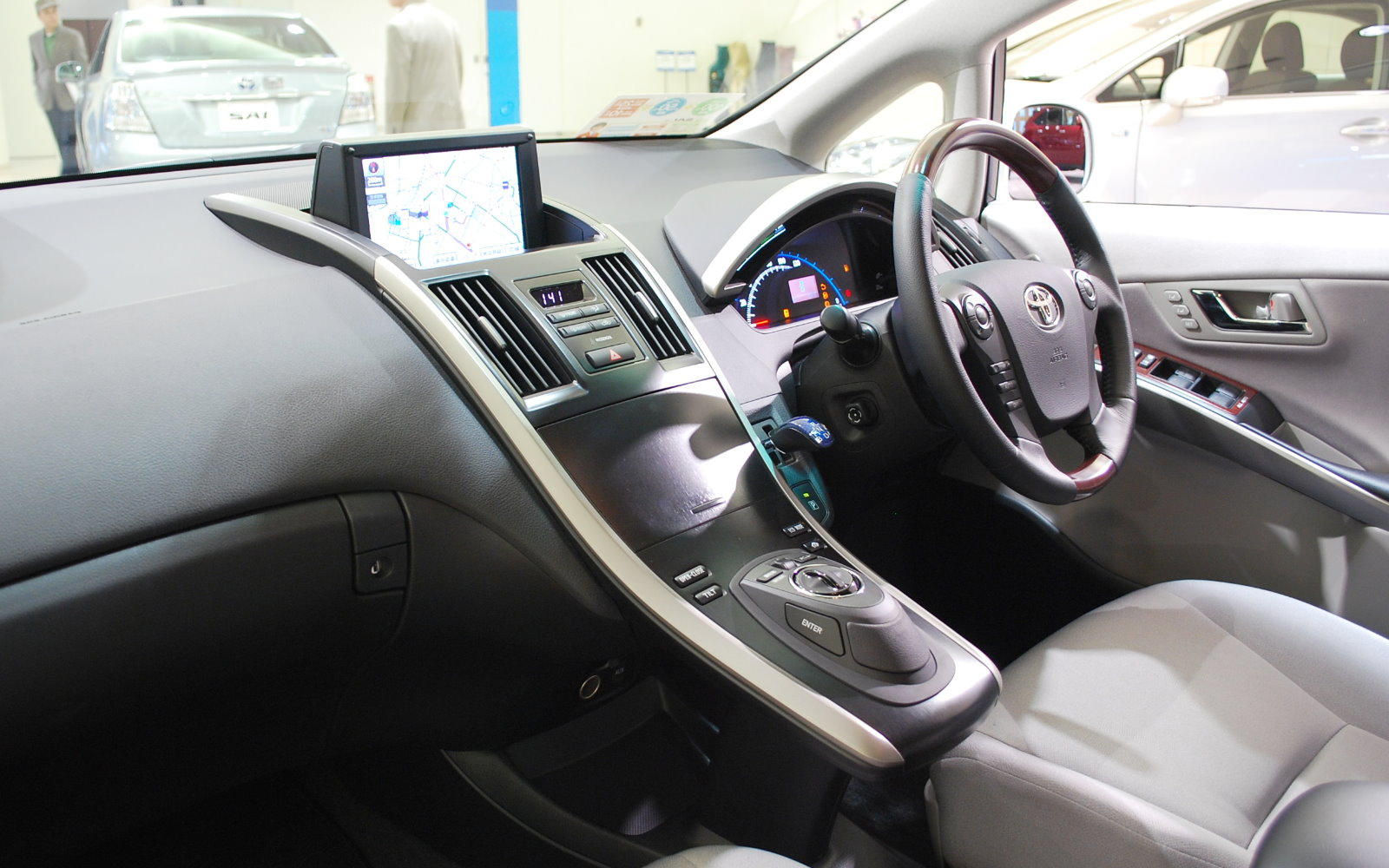
Interior

=== 2013 facelift ===
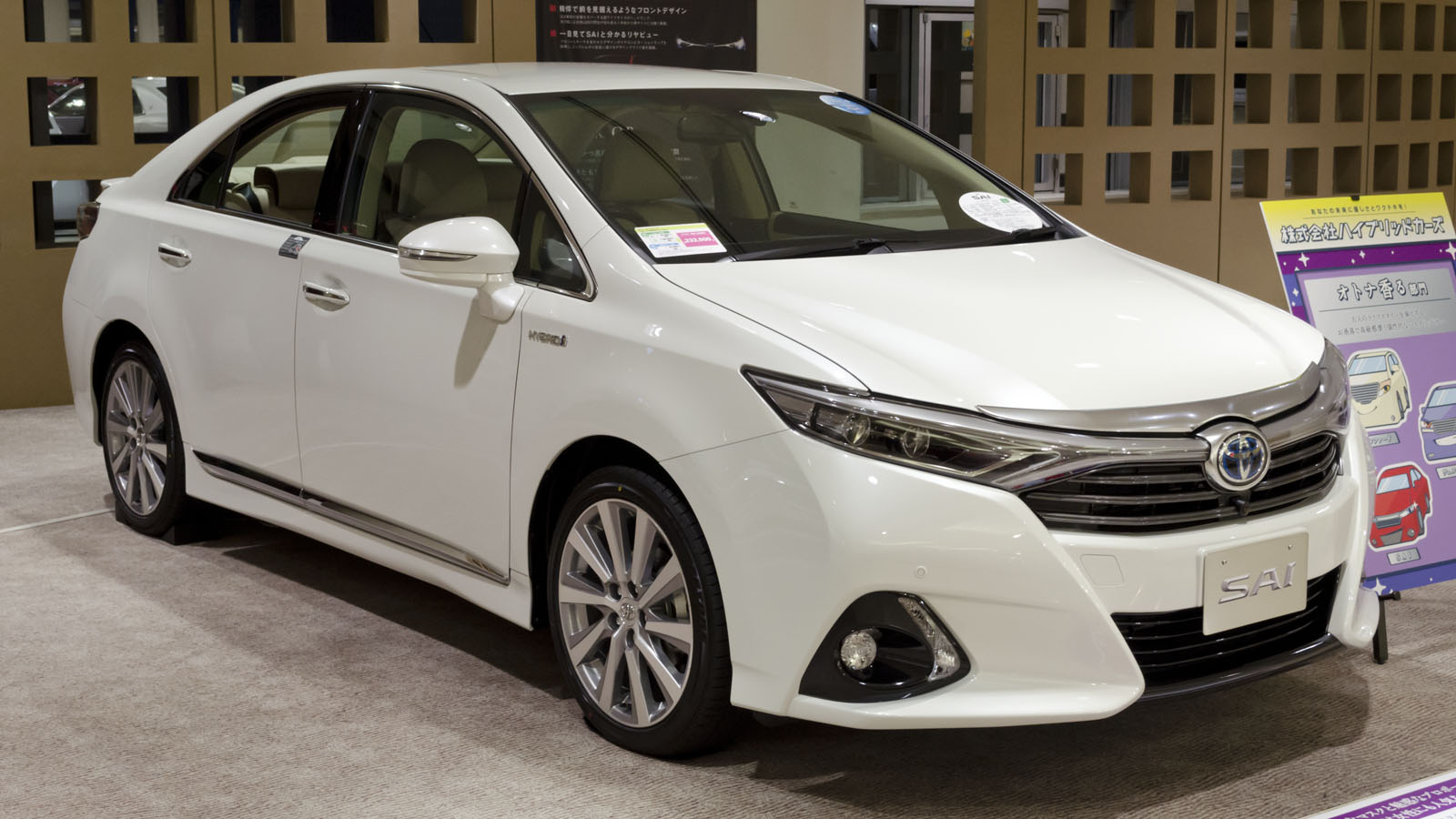
Front view

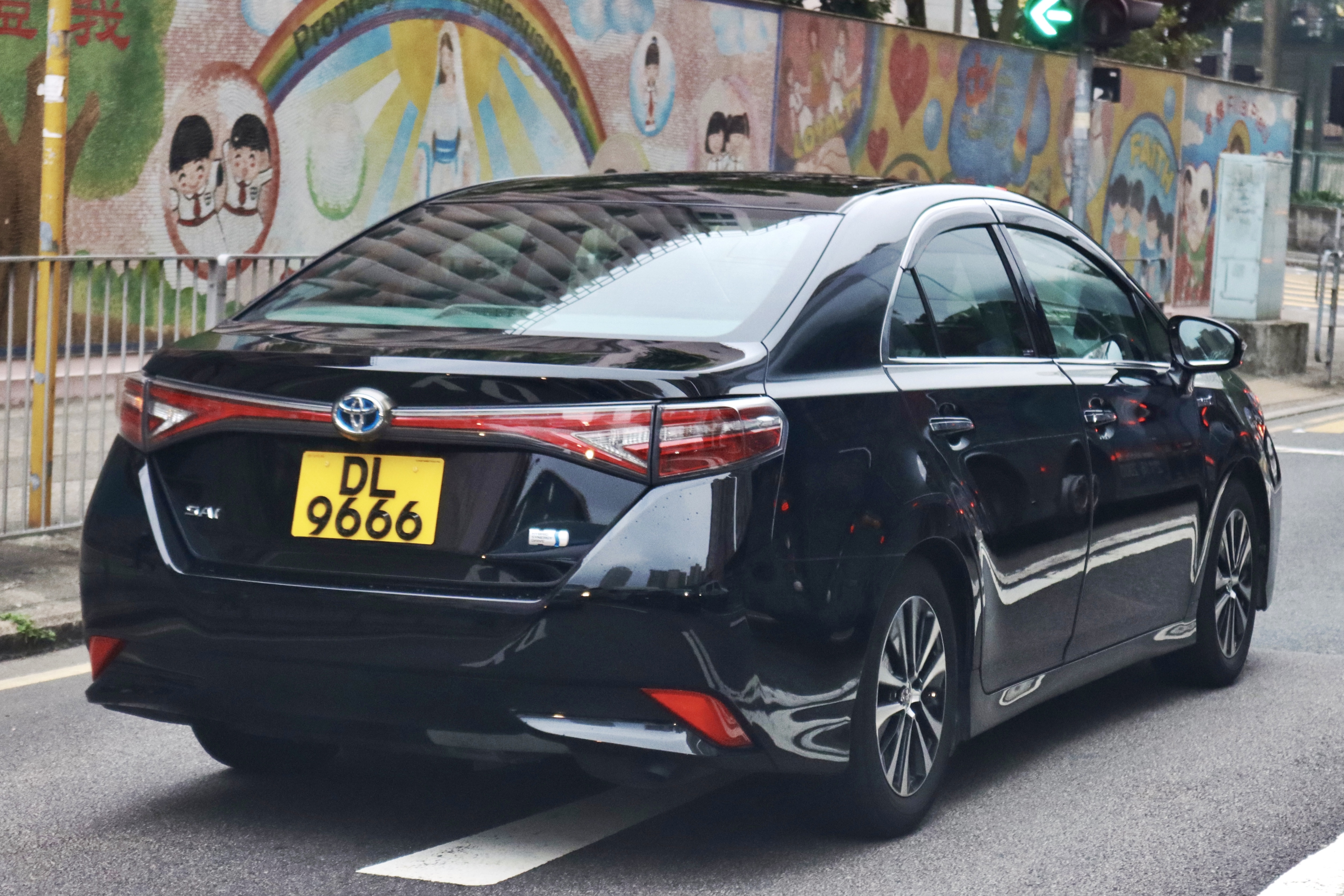
Rear view

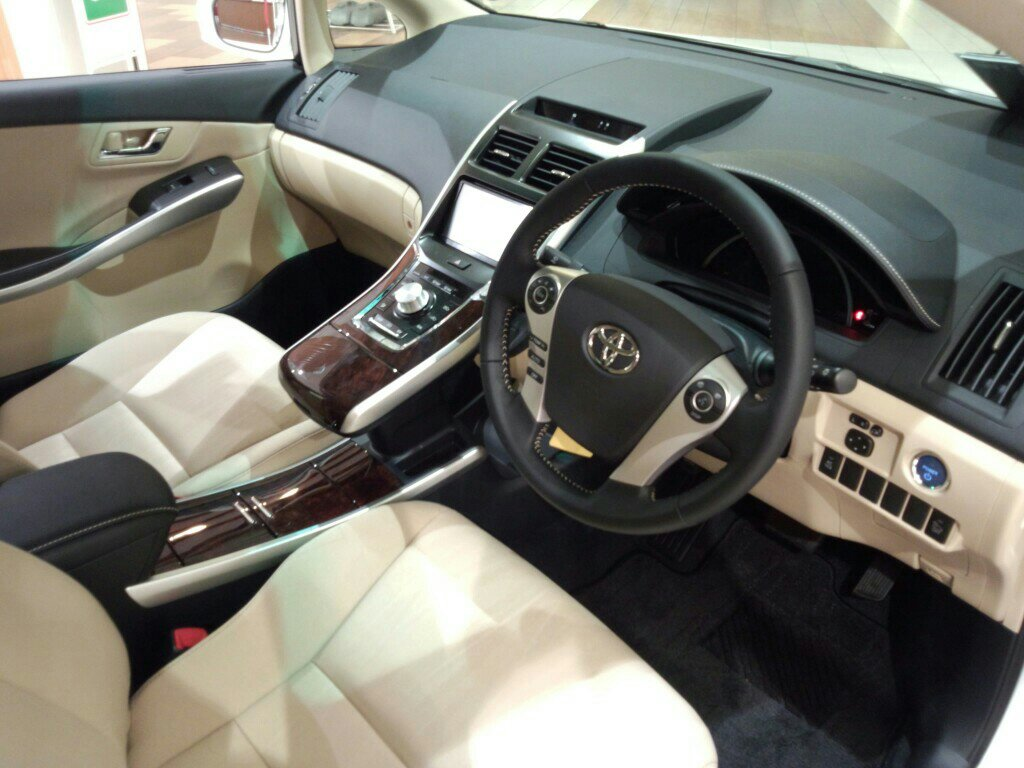
Interior
