= Lexus HS =

Hybrid luxury sedan

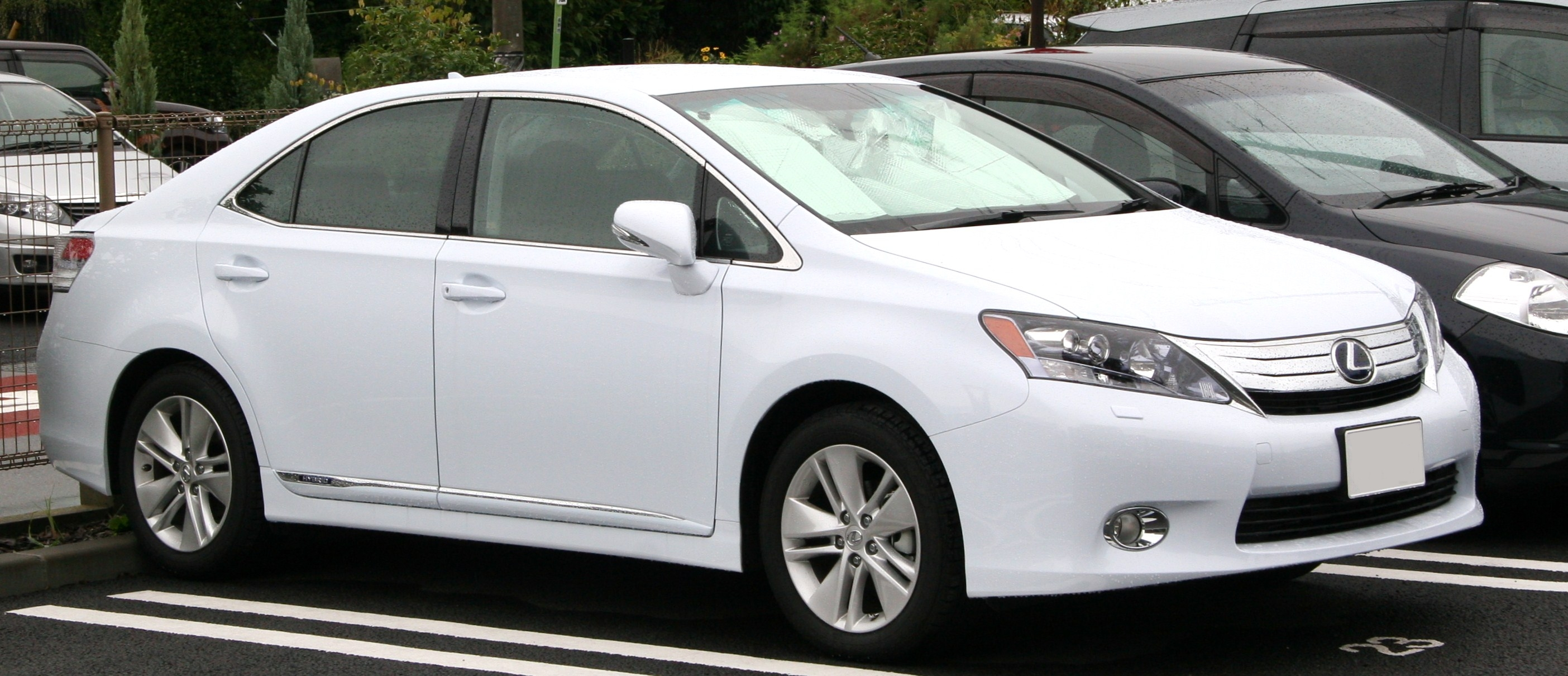

Overview
- Manufacturer: Toyota
- Model code: ANF10
- Production: July 2009 – March 2018
- Model years: 2010–2012 (North America)
- Assembly: Japan: Miyawaka, Fukuoka (Toyota Motor Kyushu)
- Designer: Kengo Matsumoto, Naoya Suzuki, Satoshi Yokoi and Shinichi Hiranaka (pre-facelift)

Body and chassis
- Class: Compact executive car (D)
- Body style: 4-door sedan
- Layout: Front-engine, front-wheel-drive
- Platform: Toyota New MC platform
- Related: Toyota Sai; Toyota Avensis (T270)

Powertrain
- Engine: 2.4 L 2AZ-FXE I4 (gasoline hybrid)
- Electric motor: 105 kW (141 hp; 143 PS) 2JM AC synchronous
- Power output: 110 kW (148 hp; 150 PS) (gasoline engine); 140 kW (188 hp; 190 PS) (combined system output)
- Transmission: eCVT
- Hybrid drivetrain: Power-split
- Battery: Nickel metal hydride

Dimensions
- Wheelbase: 2,700 mm (106.3 in)
- Length: 4,700 mm (190 in) (2009–2013); 4,710 mm (185 in) (2013–2018)
- Width: 1,785 mm (70.3 in)
- Height: 1,505 mm (59.3 in) (2009–2013); 1,495 mm (58.9 in) (2013–2018)
- Curb weight: 1,640–1,660 kg (3,616–3,660 lb)

Chronology
- Predecessor: Toyota Windom (XV30) (Japan)
- Successor: Lexus IS 300h (AVE30) (international)

The Lexus HS (Japanese: レクサス・HS, Rekusasu HS) is a dedicated hybrid vehicle introduced by Lexus as a compact executive car sedan in 2009. Using the Toyota New MC platform, it is classified as a compact under Japanese regulations concerning vehicle exterior dimensions and engine displacement. Presented at the North American International Auto Show in January 2009, the HS 250h went on sale in July 2009 in Japan, followed by the United States in August 2009 as a 2010 model.

The HS 250h represented the first dedicated hybrid vehicle in the Lexus lineup, as well as the first offered with an inline-four gasoline engine. Bioplastic materials are used for the vehicle interior. With a total length of 4,700 mm (190 in), the Lexus HS is slightly larger than the Lexus IS, but smaller than the mid-size Lexus ES.

Like the smaller Lexus CT, the larger Lexus ES and the Lexus RX FWD (which has also shared the same production line), the HS features front-wheel drive, and as such has been offered as IS's front-wheel drive counterpart. In the U.S., sales for the HS 250h lagged other models, and dropped by nearly three-quarters in 2011, despite its success in Japan. Between late May and early June 2012, Lexus removed the HS 250h from its U.S. sales lineup, while a larger front-wheel drive hybrid sedan, the ES 300h, went on sale for the latter half of 2012.

According to Lexus, the HS designation stands for Harmonious Sedan.

== Development ==
Lexus displayed the HS 250h for the first time at the North American International Auto Show in 2009, with plans to launch the vehicle in major world markets including the U.S. and Japan. According to division officials, the HS was produced in response to consumer interest in dedicated hybrid models, with many stating that they would purchase such a vehicle if a luxury make offered one. The success of the Toyota Prius with upper-income buyers was also a consideration. The resulting HS 250h would become the most fuel-efficient in the Lexus lineup at its debut. At its launch, the HS 250h was also claimed to be the most fuel-efficient luxury vehicle in the U.S. The CT 200h, launched in 2011, later surpassed the HS 250h's fuel economy ratings.

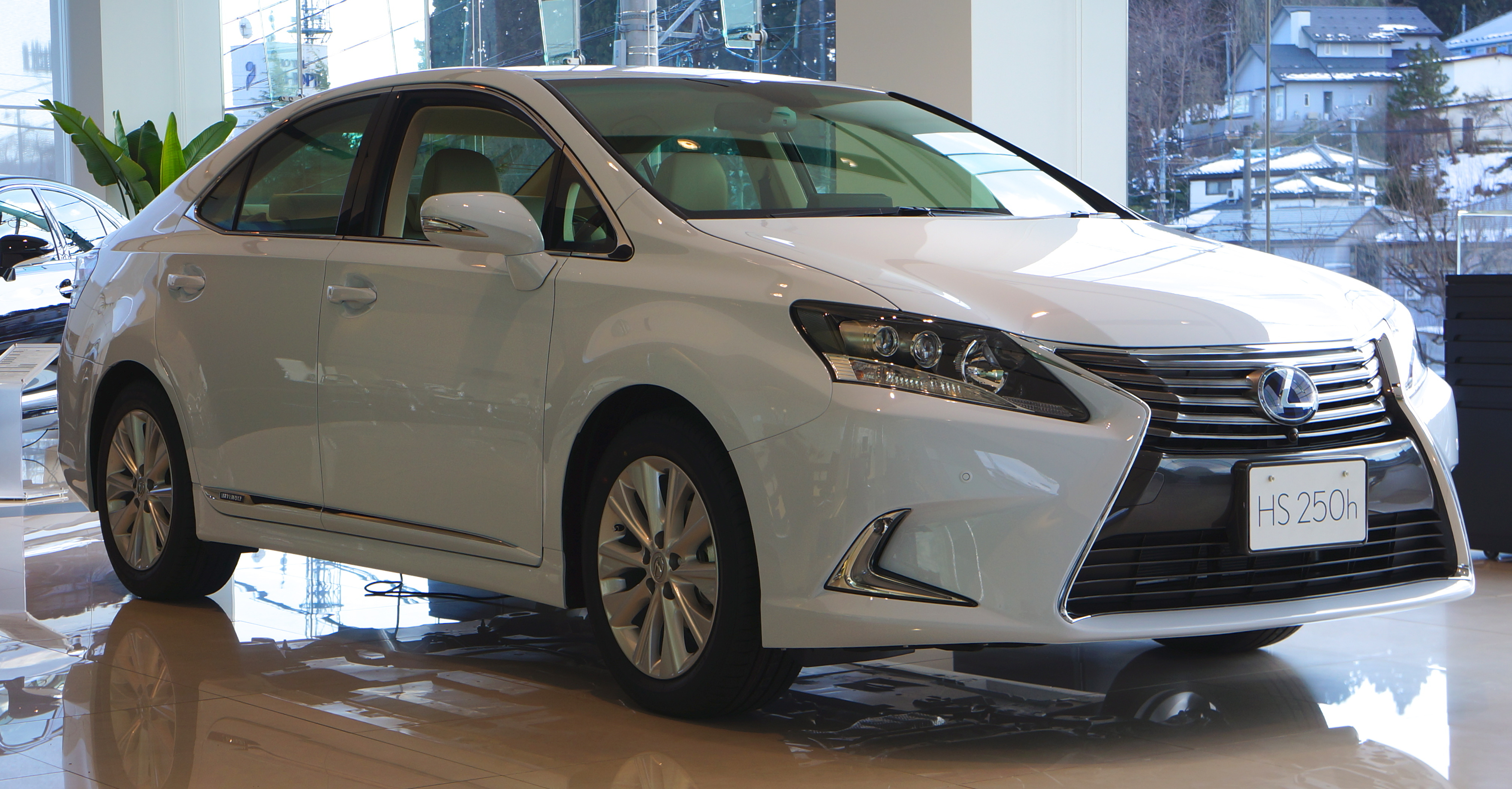
2013 facelift Lexus HS 250h (Japan)

To cater to environmentally conscious buyers, the HS 250h design included carbon footprint-reducing considerations, including the adoption of plant-derived "eco-plastic" (bioplastic) materials for the interior, cargo space, and foam injected areas. Bioplastic plant sources included kenaf fibers and castor seeds. Kenaf-based material was previously used in the Lexus ES rear interior. According to the manufacturer, 85 percent of the vehicle was fully recyclable. For the Japanese domestic market, the HS 250h featured a Harmonious Driving Navigator system which monitored efficient driving characteristics and compared them with others to determine the 'greenest' overall driver, for which charitable donations could be made.

The HS 250h's platform was based on the third-generation Toyota Avensis, itself related to the traditional gasoline engine Toyota Allion sold from 2001 to 2007, and was based on 2.4-litre-engined Corolla with electric motors. Other related models included the Toyota Premio, Toyota Vista (5th gen), Toyota Opa, Toyota Wish, and Toyota Caldina (3rd gen). In July 2009, the HS 250h made its sales launch in Japan, with 1,500 pre-orders logged at its introduction. This figure was reportedly three times greater than originally forecasted. The Toyota Sai, a sister model sharing the same platform and hybrid drivetrain, was launched in Japan in October 2009. However, HS 250h was not slated for the European market, where the similarly sized IS 220d and Toyota Avensis were sold.

The HS has a drag coefficient of Cd=0.27.

== Powertrain ==
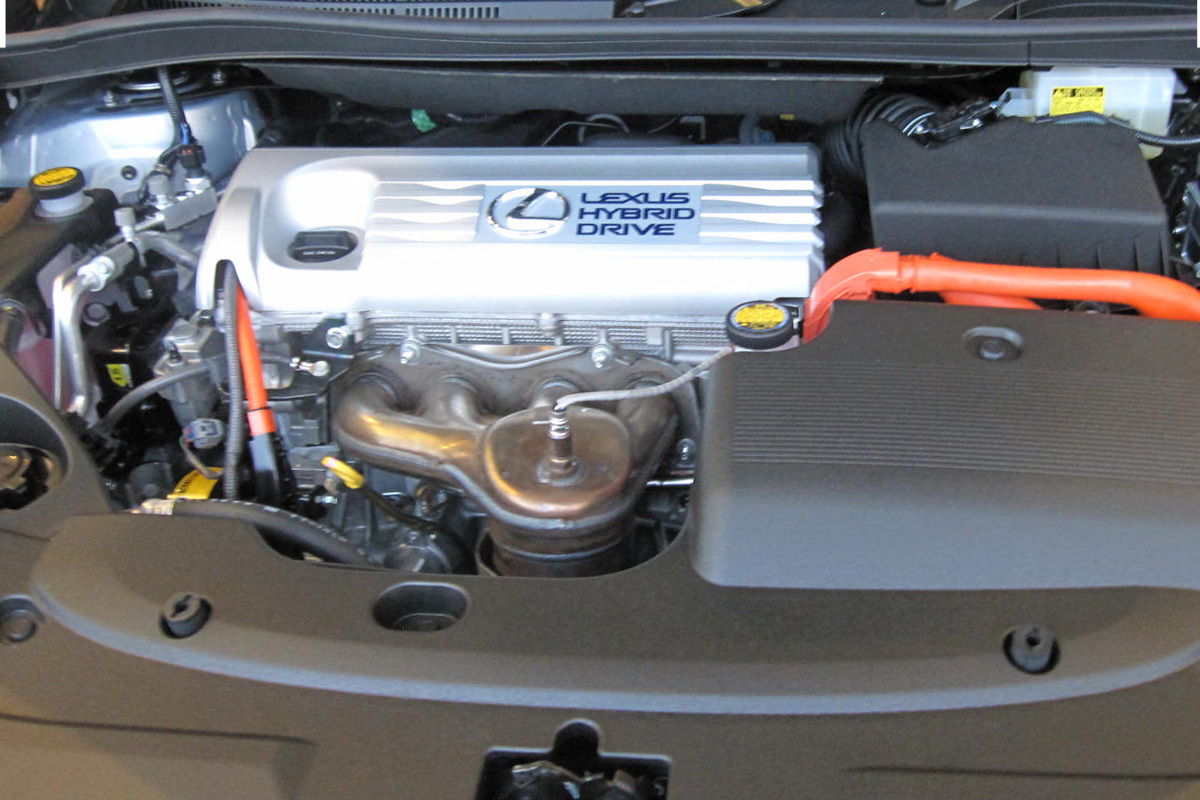
HS 250h inline-four engine with electric motors

The gasoline-powered portion of the HS 250h powertrain is the 2.4L 2AZ-FXE inline-four engine. The 2AZ-FXE produces 147 horsepower (110 kW) and 105 foot-pounds force (142 N⋅m) of torque at 4,000 revolutions per minute. This is assisted by an electric motor for a combined output of 187 hp (139 kW) and 138 ft⋅lbf (187 N⋅m). The HS 250h uses a similar hybrid drivetrain as the Toyota Camry Hybrid.

The HS 250h's EPA fuel economy is estimated at 35 miles per US gallon (6.7 L/100 km; 42 mpg_{‑imp}) in the city and 34 mpg_{‑US} (6.9 L/100 km; 41 mpg_{‑imp}) on the highway. The HS 250h engine runs on the Atkinson cycle, and the powertrain uses a continuously variable transmission. A 41-kilogram (90 lb) nickel metal hydride battery situated between the trunk and rear seats serves to power the electric motor. An additional system included on the HS 250h's Lexus Hybrid Drive powertrain is an exhaust heat recovery system to reduce engine warm-up periods (optimizing engine start-stop times). The Atkinson cycle configuration and exhaust-heat recovery system is also used on the 2010 Lexus RX 450h.

The HS 250h can be operated in either driver-selectable EV, Eco, Normal, or Power modes. The EV mode is suited for short-distance pure electric driving at speeds of up to 32 kilometres per hour (20 mph), the Eco mode can be selected for the greatest fuel efficiency in mixed gas-electric driving, and the Power mode offers more performance in contrast to the Eco mode. The 0–60 mph time is listed at 8.4 seconds and the top speed is 180 km/h (112 mph).

== Equipment ==
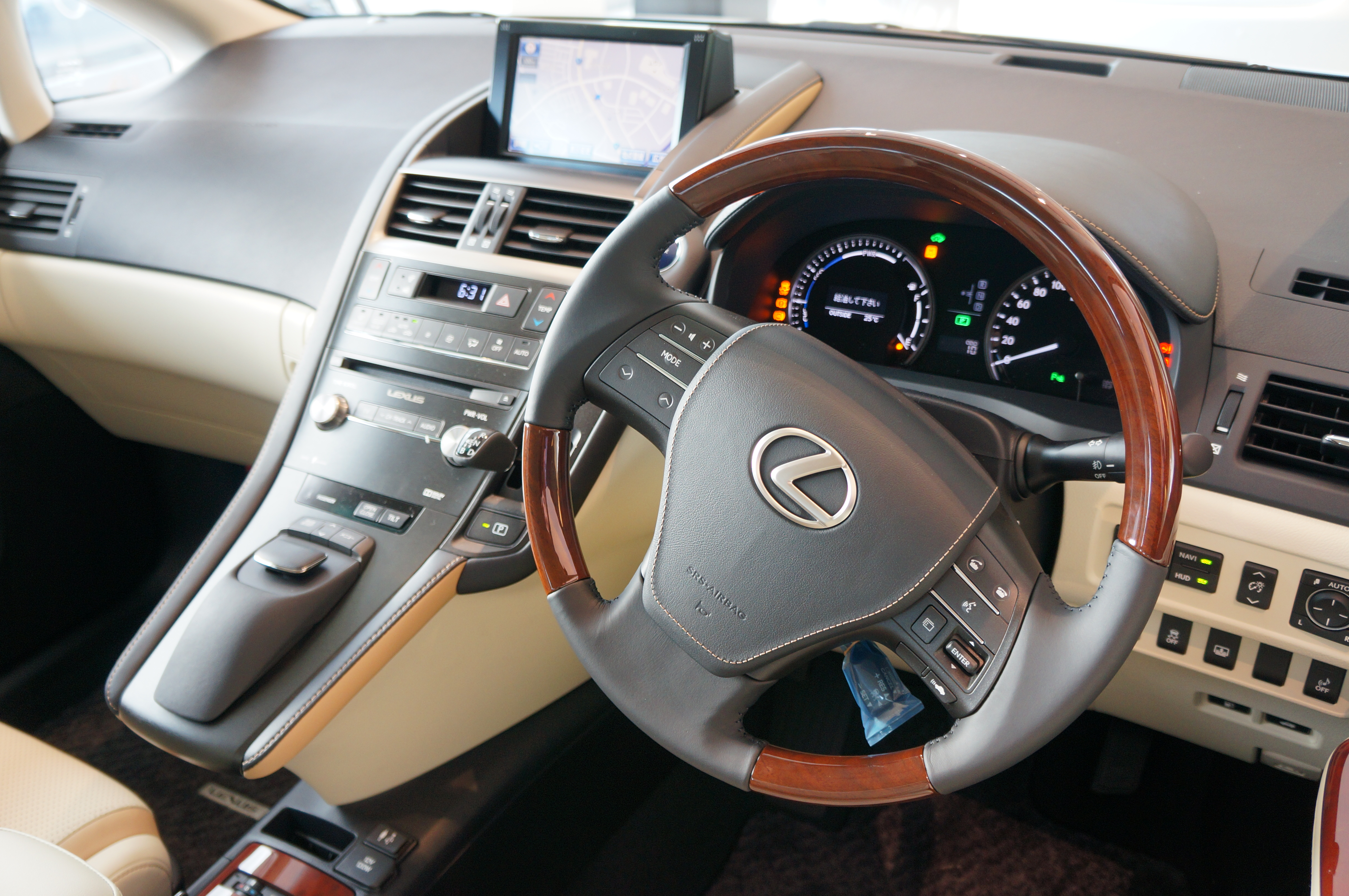
Lexus HS 250h interior with pop-up display screen

Technological features offered on the HS 250h include a pop-up navigation and infotainment system with Remote Touch controller, a Mark Levinson premium sound system, and safety systems. The Remote Touch system is used with the GPS navigation system and operates using haptic feedback. The Lexus Enform telematics service is introduced on the HS 250h.

Safety systems include an Intelligent Highbeam (IHB) system, Lane Keep Assist (LKA) system, and onboard cameras. The IHB senses oncoming vehicles and adjusts lighting to prevent glare. The LKA system, operating in conjunction with the radar adaptive cruise control, helps keep the vehicle in its lane. Up to five onboard cameras include Wide-View Front and Rear-View backup cameras. These cameras allow the driver to see around corners. The LED detector Driver Monitoring System warns if the driver is not paying attention and obstacles are detected in the vehicle's path, preventing accidents due to drowsiness or distraction. A Pre-Collision System is designed to minimize damage from accidents.

== Sales ==
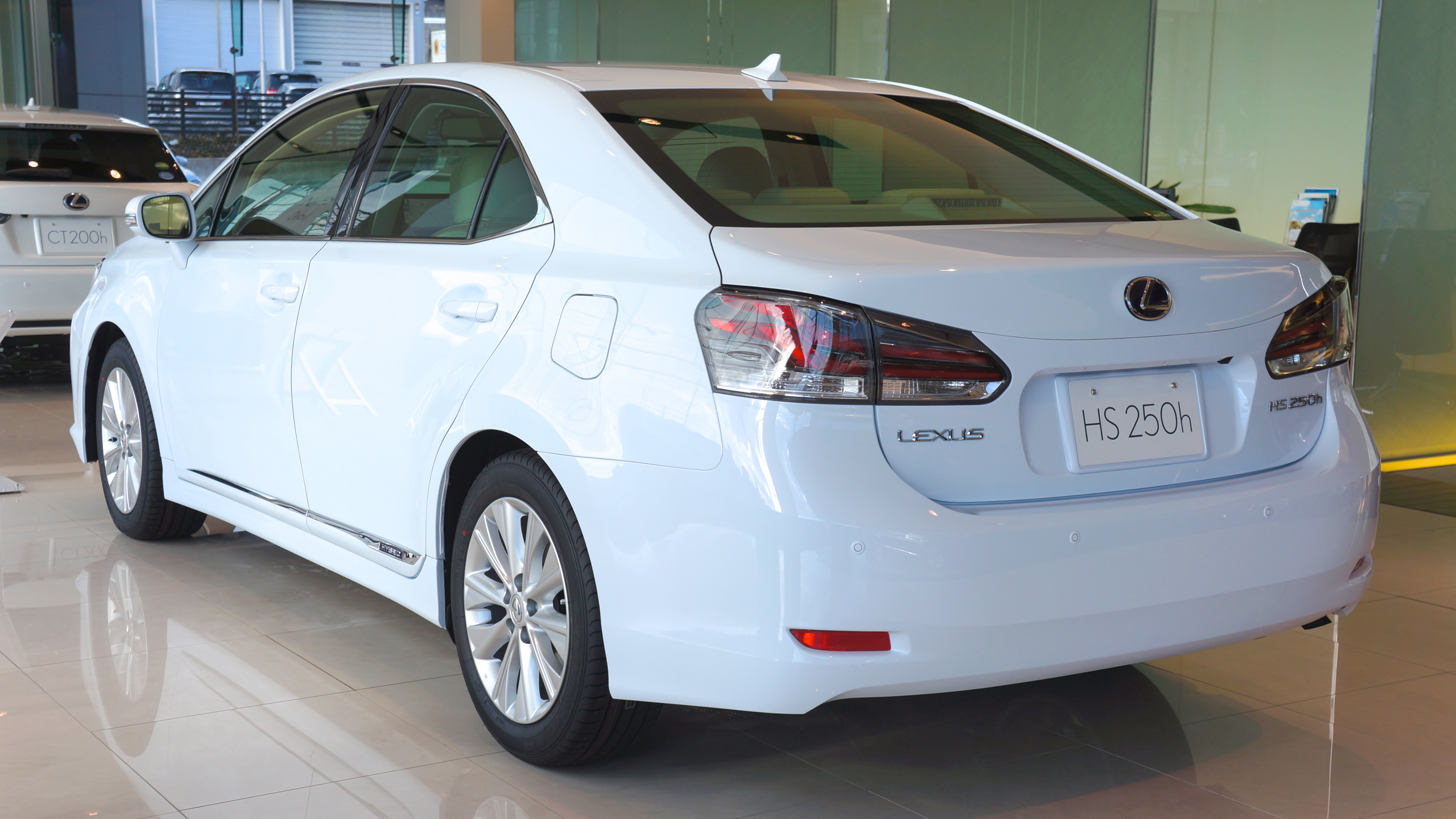
Lexus HS 250h

The Lexus HS had early success in the Japanese market, where in its first month, the vehicle recorded 3,000 pre-orders, 10,000 sales, and a waiting list that was six months long. Because of the higher than expected demand in Japan, Lexus lowered its allocation and sales plans for the United States in October 2009.

In early 2010, based on units sold, the HS was considered one of the less popular Lexus sedans in the US, being outsold by the ES, IS, and LS, despite the HS being successful in its home market of Japan. A recall of models for reprogramming the brake software in February 2010 also led some buyers to question the model; with word of the issue possibly scaring away potential buyers. Earlier in its release, however, the HS 250h was the top-selling Lexus hybrid, with monthly sales comparable to the economy Honda Insight hybrid.

Calendar year	Sales (US)	Sales (Japan)
2009	6,699	8,494
2010	10,663	14,247
2011	2,864	6,263
2012	649	4,965
2013	5	5,735
2014	0	

== 2010 recall ==
On 25 June 2010, Lexus recalled 17,801 MY 2010 HS 250h models for failing to comply with FMVSS 301, "Fuel System Integrity", due to excessive fuel leakage in the event of a rear-end collision.

== 2013 facelift ==
In January 2013, the Lexus HS received a facelift. The front receives the Lexus signature Spindle Grille first seen on the Lexus GS. Other changes include lowering the height by 10 mm (0.39 in), refined interior, and the addition of SPORT MODE on the Drive Mode Select. While it still retains the 2.4 L gasoline engine, the fuel economy is now 20.6 km/L (58 mpg_{‑imp}; 48 mpg_{‑US}), based on JC08 Mode cycle.

== Discontinuation ==
In late 2011, Ward's AutoWorld reported that Lexus was discontinuing sales of the HS 250h in the U.S. A Lexus representative confirmed this in May 2012, "Production of the HS 250h ceased in January, 2012. Lexus continues to monitor sales for each product and we make adjustments to make sure that we meet market demand, and the discontinuation of HS was part of that adjustment. The ES 300h is not replacing HS in our lineup. It's merely part of the hybridization of many of our existing vehicles in the Toyota and Lexus lineups."

In 2017, the HS 250h, along with the Toyota Sai, were discontinued in the Japanese domestic market and replaced by a larger, TNGA-based ES 300h, making the debut of ES nameplate there as well as serving the front-wheel-drive counterpart of GS until the latter's departure in 2020.
