= Lexus TZ =

Battery electric mid-size luxury crossover SUV

- Lexus TZ550e (Japan)

Overview
- Manufacturer: Toyota
- Production: 2026 (to commence)
- Assembly: Japan: Miyawaka, Fukuoka (TMK); United States: Georgetown, Kentucky (TMMK); China: Shanghai (Lexus (Shanghai) New Energy; coming in 2027)

Body and chassis
- Class: Mid-size luxury crossover SUV
- Body style: 5-door SUV
- Layout: Dual-motor, all-wheel-drive
- Platform: TNGA: GA-K
- Chassis: Unibody
- Related: Toyota Highlander / Subaru Getaway; Lexus ES (XZ20)

Powertrain
- Electric motor: AC permanent magnet synchronous
- Power output: 402 hp (300 kW; 408 PS) (TZ 550e)
- Transmission: eAxle
- Battery: 76.96–95.82 kWh lithium-ion
- Range: 300 mi (483 km) (EPA, claimed); 385 mi (620 km) (WLTC, claimed); 329 mi (530 km) (WLTP, claimed); 398 mi (640 km) (CLTC, claimed)
- Plug-in charging: 11/19/22 kW onboard charger (AC); 150 kW fast charging (DC)

Dimensions
- Wheelbase: 3,050 mm (120.1 in)
- Length: 5,100 mm (200.8 in)
- Width: 1,990 mm (78.3 in)
- Height: 1,705 mm (67.1 in)
- Curb weight: 2,630 kg (5,798 lb)

The Lexus TZ (Japanese: レクサス・TZ, Hepburn: Rekusasu TZ) is a battery electric mid-size luxury crossover SUV with three-row seating produced by Toyota for their Lexus brand.

== Overview ==
Previewed by the Electrified SUV concept in late 2021, the TZ was officially unveiled on May 7, 2026 as Lexus' first three-row battery electric vehicle. It is regarded as the battery electric equivalent of the TX. Unlike the TX, it will be marketed outside of North America, including in Japan, China, Australia and Europe. Production for most markets will take place in Japan while production for North America will take place in Kentucky. Production is also projected to take place for the Chinese market at the forthcoming Lexus plant near Shanghai.

Rear view

Interior

=== Features ===
The TZ features Lexus' latest design language, including double L-shaped headlights, a spindle body/grille, and a rear lightbar with L-shaped turn signals positioned near the sides of the lower bumper.

The interior features a similar setup to the ES (XZ20), including a 12.3-inch (31 cm) digital instrument cluster and a 14-inch (36 cm) central display operated by the Lexus Connect operating system, with a redesigned steering wheel featuring an embossed Lexus wordmark instead of the logo, and physical "Hidden Tech" switches. Sustainable materials such as forged bamboo made from Shikoku bamboo, and UltraSuede plant-based upholstery is used across the interior. It is also equipped with a 21-speaker Mark Levinson sound system and a panoramic glass roof.

The TZ is exclusively offered in a 6-seater three row setup with individual second row seats. The first two rows feature heated and ventilated seats, while the rear seats feature power-adjustable legrests.

In addition to the typical Normal, Sport and Eco driving modes, the TZ features exclusive 'Range' and 'Rear Comfort' modes; the latter of which is claimed to coordinate dynamic rear steering up to 4 degrees, brake force optimization and drive force distribution, minimizing pitching and lateral motion to enhance rear comfort. Five levels of regenerative braking is available. The TZ can also simulate the exhaust note of the LFA's V10 engine.

=== Powertrain ===
The TZ wil first be offered in a dual-motor all-wheel-drive configuration, with a total power output of 402 hp (300 kW) and a 0 to 100 km/h (62 mph) acceleration time of 5.4 seconds. A choice of either a 77 or 96 kW battery, with the latter offering a claimed electric range of up to 300 mi (480 km) EPA, 385 mi (620 km) WLTP and 398 mi (641 km) CLTC. Both batteries offer preconditioning to optimize temperature, and an intelligent charging schedule suggestion based on driver habits. All models can charge up to 150 kW using a DC fast charger.
