= Remote Touch =

Vehicle interface system

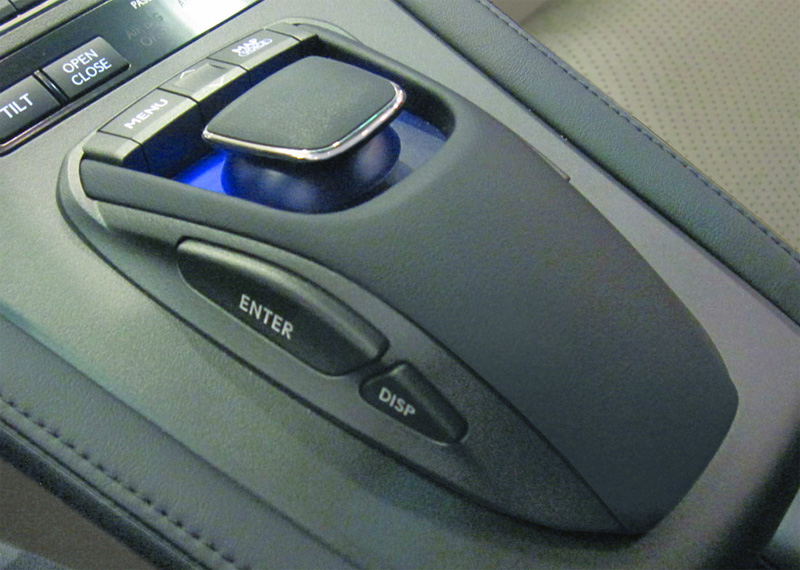
Lexus Remote Touch controller and palmrest

Remote Touch is a vehicle interface system present in some Lexus cars for use in conjunction with in-car information, configuration, and entertainment systems. The Remote Touch controller, which is similar to a computer mouse or joystick, allows the driver to operate an on-screen cursor on the vehicle's GPS navigation system screen.

Remote Touch utilizes haptic feedback, where the controller provides reaction force, and force feedback, where the on-screen cursor can move to nearby buttons automatically. System functions can be configured by the driver.

Remote Touch was first introduced on the 2010 Lexus RX 350 and Lexus RX 450h models, followed by the 2010 Lexus HS 250h.

== Background ==
Prior to the advent of Remote Touch, Lexus interiors were typically equipped with touchscreen interfaces. Although this system was regarded by many reviewers as easier to use than conventional rotary knob controllers, the need to place the touchscreen within easy reach limited design possibilities for the interior (by forcing placement of the screen in the center dash and in close proximity to the steering wheel). The enhanced technology trend in the automotive industry also resulted in a plethora of ever-increasing buttons and switches on many luxury vehicles.

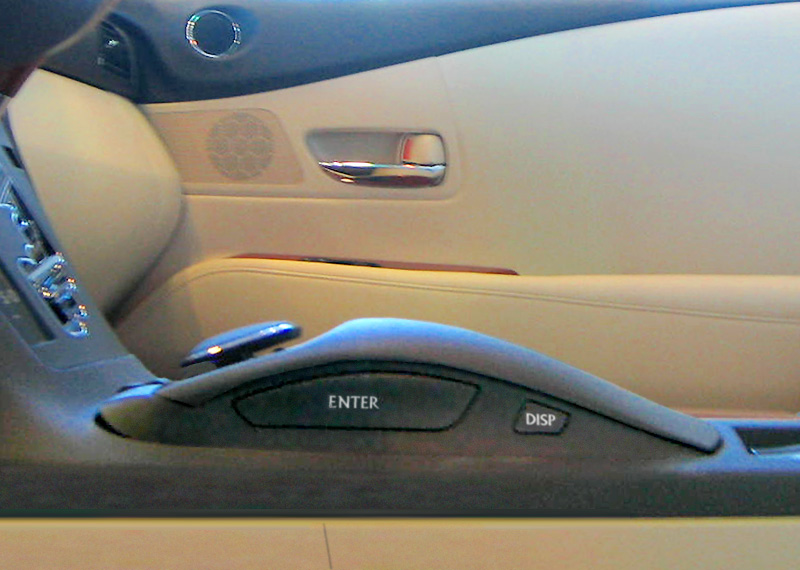
Side view of the Remote Touch controller

In response, several luxury brands had switched to rotary knob control devices, with the aim to simplify cabin layout and consolidate multiple controls with a single device. The BMW iDrive, Audi MMI, and Mercedes-Benz COMAND APS interfaces operated using a circular center knob which can be rotated side to side, and pressed to select items, with the rotary knob scrolling through on-screen menus. Of these systems, some reviewers praised their ability to simplify the dash layout, while others levied criticism for reputed complexity and user difficulty, particularly with iDrive.

In the mid 2000s, Lexus began developing an alternative to the touchscreen interface, in light of the latter's restrictions on interior styling and instrument panel configuration. Prototype development and consumer testing was conducted to develop a new control device. Consumer research conducted with Lexus supplier Denso corporation indicated that the prototype control system required no more mental or physical effort than a touchscreen, plus offered interior layouts with more screen visibility, was physically more comfortable to operate, and easier to use while in motion.

== Design ==
Unveiled by Lexus at the 2008 Los Angeles Auto Show in November of that year, Remote Touch became Lexus' entry into the realm of non-touchscreen human-machine interfaces. Introduced on the third generation Lexus RX, the Remote Touch system differs from previous interfaces in being the first to use a computer mouse (or trackball)-based concept, instead of the rotary knob model. The system allows the operator to freely move the on-screen cursor across any part of the screen. The cursor replaces the role of the driver's hand on the previous touchscreen interface.

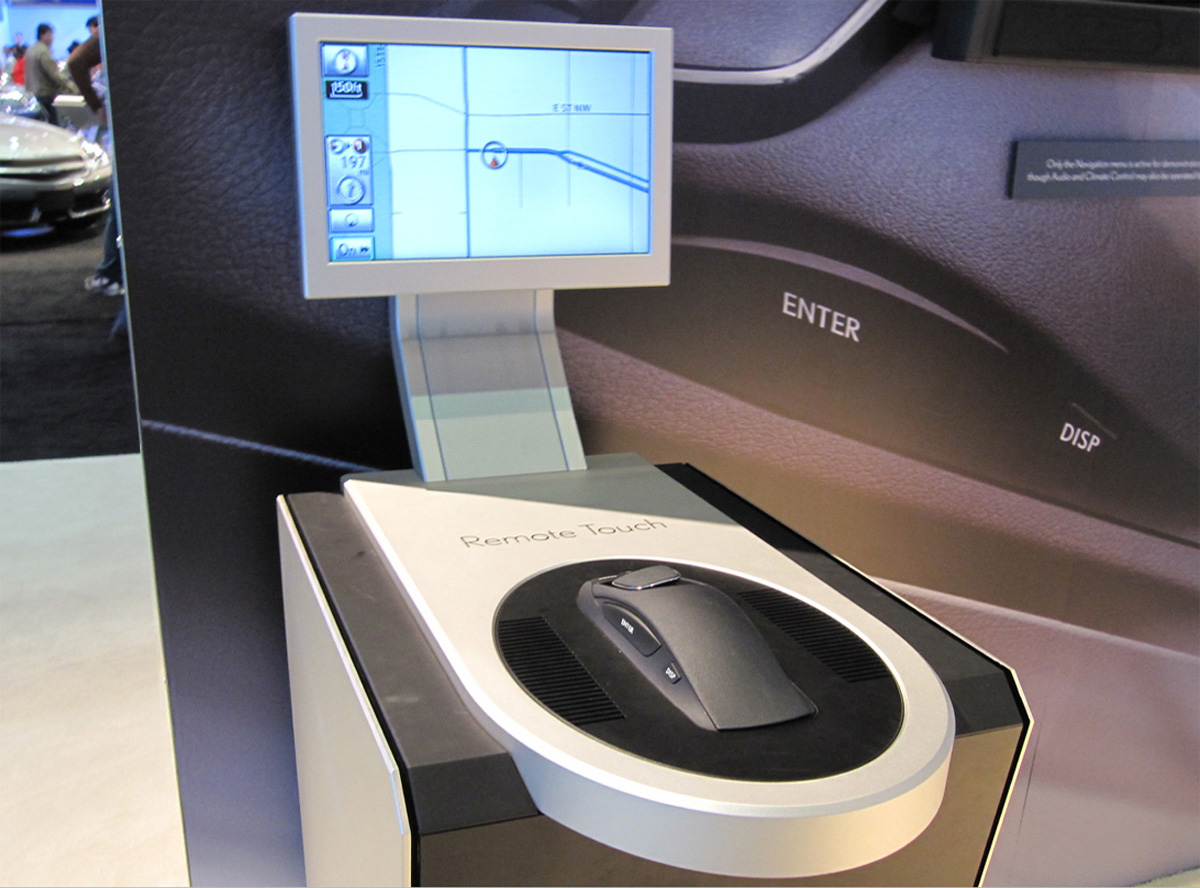
Remote Touch demonstrator at the 2008 Los Angeles Auto Show

Remote Touch is also the first vehicle interface to incorporate user-adjustable haptic feedback, and utilize movement in two spatial axes. The incorporation of haptic feedback, similar to the Wii Remote, enables the driver to feel the placement of buttons and icons on the screen by touch. The use of force feedback enables the cursor to 'snap-to' buttons, making it easier to select buttons without precise movement. To ease drivers' transition to Remote Touch, the same on-screen layout and menus as the prior touchscreen-based system are used on models equipped with the new control system.

The Remote Touch controller, which (including the directional input, buttons, and palmrest) measures 88 mm (3.5 in) in width x 20 mm (0.79 in) in length, and is 95 mm (3.7 in) tall, is placed at the base of the center console. Two large buttons (Enter) on both sides of the controller at thumb level are used to select icons, along with three secondary buttons (Map, Scroll, and Display). With the replacement of the touchscreen, the navigation screen is now recessed and placed closer to eye level on the dashboard. Remote Touch has two motors and an encoder, with the motors programmed to reset the controller to a neutral position when the navigation system is activated.

The introduction of Remote Touch on the 2010 Lexus RX was generally well received by reviewers, and the system was described as easier to use than rivals by Autoblog, Car and Driver, Cars.com, CNET, Consumer Guide, Edmunds.com, Motor Trend, PC Magazine, Road & Track, and Winding Road, with Motor Trend predicting that competitors would adopt its design. However, the system remained a controversial interface for some drivers who found it difficult to use, as compared to the previous, Lexus-standard touchscreen. Remote Touch won Popular Mechanics Technical Innovation Award, and was named Popular Science's "Best of What's New" in Auto Tech for 2009.

== Functions ==
The Remote Touch system can be used to control a host of vehicle functions, as listed below. Multiple functions can also be accessed via voice commands and for basic or commonly used items, such as stereo and climate control, via dedicated buttons.

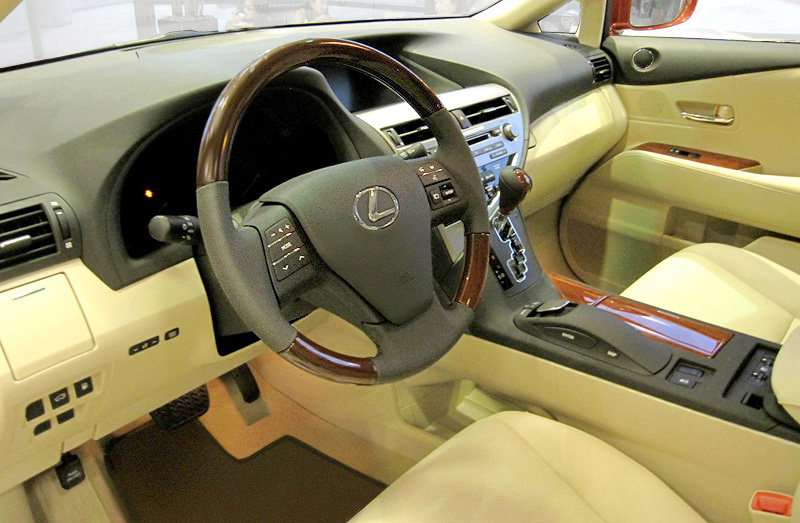
Interior of the 2010 RX 350 with Remote Touch system

- Audio system (DVD changer, radio)
- Bluetooth (telephone, phonebook)
- Climate control
- GPS satellite navigation
- Hard disk drive operation
- Hybrid information display
- iPod or mp3 player interface
- Lexus Enform (news, stocks, telematics; US)
- Lexus Insider (owner news and information)
- G-Book (telematics, maps, media; Japan, China)
- Personalized vehicle settings (configure locks, lights, etc.)
- Safety Connect (emergency services)
- Setup for navigation, other systems
- XM NavTraffic or XM NavWeather
- Video entertainment system
- Wide-View Front, Side, Backup cameras

== Vehicles ==
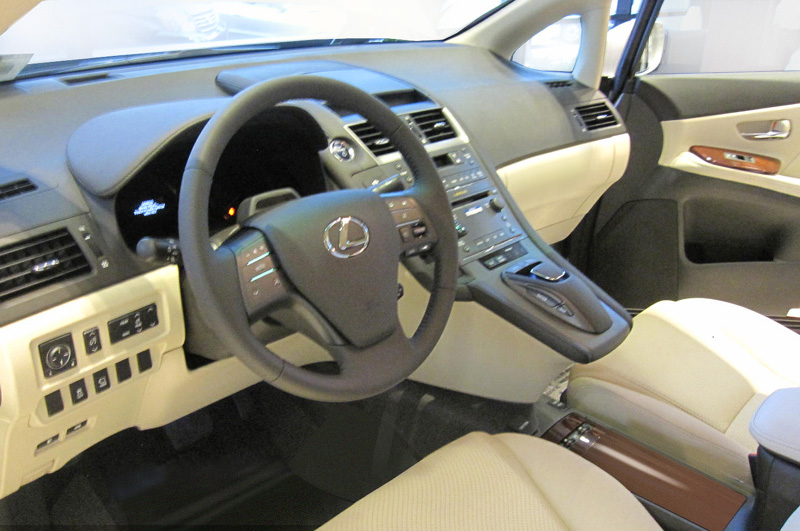
Interior of the 2010 HS 250h with Remote Touch controller

Lexus models that have adopted the Remote Touch interface to date, listed by model year:

- 2010 Lexus RX
- 2010 Lexus HS
- 2011 Lexus GS
- 2011 Lexus CT
- 2012 Lexus LFA
- 2013 Lexus ES
- 2014 Lexus IS
- 2014 Lexus NX
- 2016 Lexus LX

The 2010 RX Remote Touch system operates in conjunction with a 228 mm (9.0 in) forward dash-mounted display, along with organic light-emitting diode (OLED) instrument cluster and optional white LED heads-up display (HUD), while the 2010 HS Remote Touch system uses a 228 mm (9.0 in) pop-up navigation screen along with the OLED display and optional HUD.

As of 2009, the Lexus LS, GS, IS, ES sedans, SC and IS coupes, and the LX(until 2015) and GX sport utility vehicles use a touchscreen interface system, which in new models includes the same menu interface and layout as the Remote Touch-equipped models.
