= Miyata, Fukuoka =

Town in Kurate District, Fukuoka, Japan

Miyata (宮田町, Miyata-machi) was a town located in Kurate District, Fukuoka Prefecture, Japan.

As of 2003, the town had an estimated population of 20,984 and a density of 399.77 persons per km^{2}. The total area was 52.49 km^{2}.

On February 11, 2006, Miyata was merged with the town of Wakamiya (also from Kurate District) to create the city of Miyawaka.
