= Takehara Kofun =

Japanese 6th-century tomb at Suwa Shrine

- 竹原古墳 (Japanese)
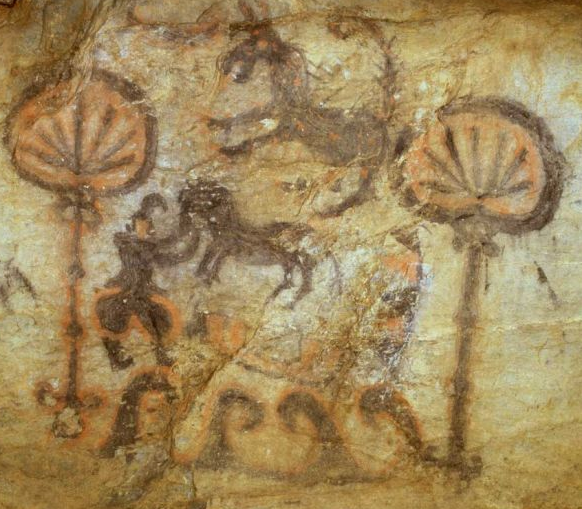
- Takehara Kofun murals

- Takehara Kofun Takehara Kofun (Japan)
- Interactive map of Takehara Kofun
- 33°43′59.7″N 130°36′36.5″E
- Type: Kofun
- Periods: Kofun period
- Location: Miyawaka, Fukuoka, Japan
- Region: Kyushu

History
- Built: c.6th century

Site notes
- Public access: Yes (no facilities)

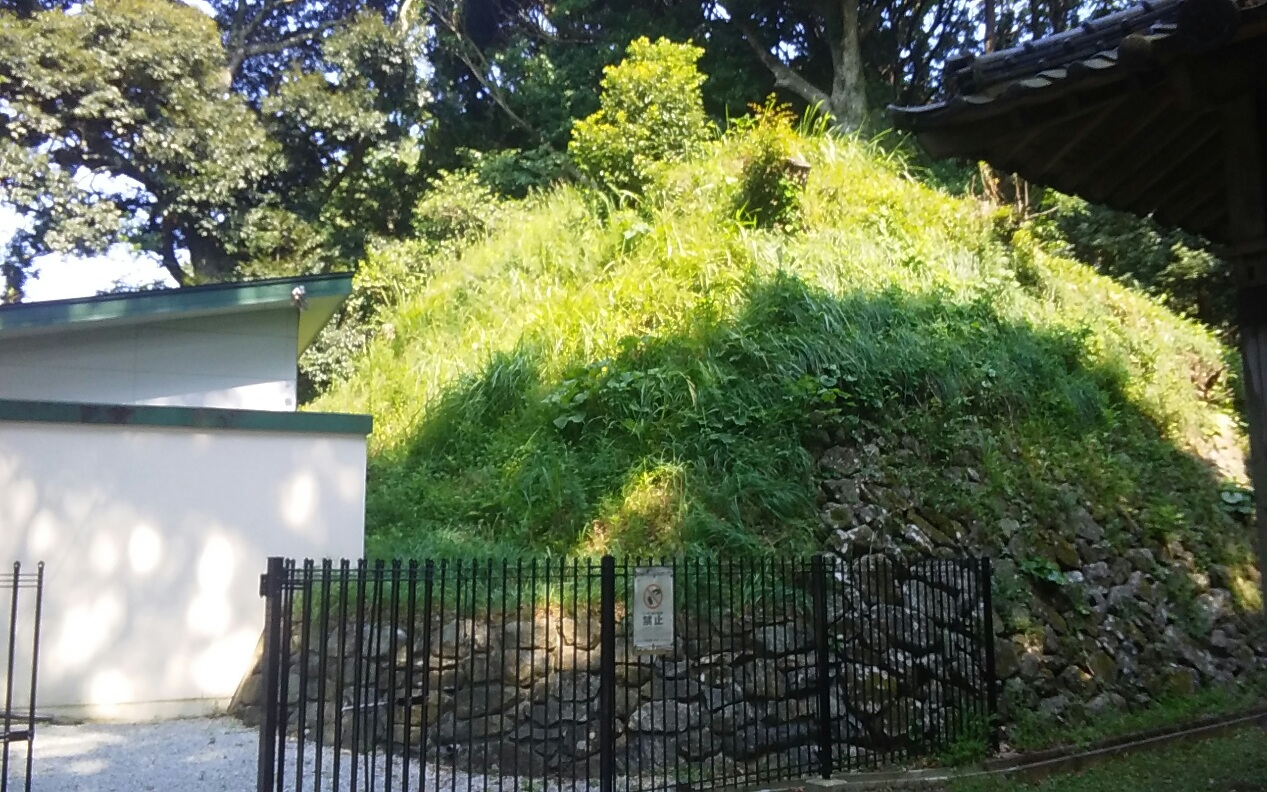
Takeharu Kofun

The Takehara Kofun (竹原古墳) is a Kofun period burial mound, located in the Takehara neighborhood of the city of Miyawaka, Fukuoka Prefecture Japan. The tumulus was designated a National Historic Site of Japan in 1957.

== Overview ==
The Takehara Kofun is a enpun (円墳) circular tumulus with a diameter of approximately 17.5 meters and height of six meters, located within the grounds of a Suwa Shrine. The site is located on a hill between the Kuromaru River and the Yamaguchi River, which are tributaries of the Inunaki River. It was discovered in March 1956. The burial chamber is a horizontal entry stone chamber with a total length of 7.7 meters, orientated to the south. It consists of an anterior chamber and a posterior chamber. The side walls were built with broken stones, and the posterior chamber is approximately 2.7 meters long, 2.2 meters wide, and 3 meters high, and the anterior chamber is approximately 1.2 meters long, 1.6 meters wide, and 2.2 meters high. It is a decorated kofun and its noted for its excellent mural, which is painted on the huge monolithic stone forming the back wall of the posterior chamber. This mural is approximately 1.5 by 2 meters wide and has clear colors of black and red. the design consists of geometric designs, such as triangles, waves and small boats, a representation of a funeral ritual with noblemen in attendance, and a horse race. The mural also contains the Four Symbols of Taoism, of which the Azure Dragon is in good preservation, with the Vermilion Bird and Black Tortoise less clear. Grave goods include magatama beads, glass beads, metal rings, horse harnesses (bridles, apricot leaves, crosspiece fittings, etc.), and weapons (sword scabbards, iron arrowheads). The tumulus is believed to date from the latter half of the 6th century, and to show a strong influence from Goguryeo.

The tumulus is open to the public on Mondays. The tumulus is approximately 13 kilometers west of Nōgata Station on the JR Kyushu Chikuhō Main Line.

== See also ==
- List of Historic Sites of Japan (Fukuoka)
- Decorated kofun
