= Wakamiya, Fukuoka =

Dissolved municipality in Fukuoka prefecture, Japan

Wakamiya (若宮町, Wakamiya-machi) was a town located in Kurate District, Fukuoka Prefecture, Japan.

As of 2003, the town had an estimated population of 9,889 and a density of 113.02 persons per km^{2}. The total area was 87.50 km^{2}.

On February 11, 2006, Wakamiya, along with the town of Miyata (also from Kurate District), was merged to create the city of Miyawaka.
