= Warichi =

Former Japanese land distribution practice

Warichi or wari-chi (Japanese: 割地), literally "dividing the land", is a redistribution and communal management practice for arable land in Japan. It became common during the early modern era (seventeenth to nineteenth-century). It was used as a means of managing flood impacts. The practice was continued by tenant unions into at least the 1980s. It had influence upon the makeup of Japanese society.

Villages that practiced warichi periodically reassigned land to local farmers. The process used unbiased and random techniques, including lottery groups (kuji kumi), to ensure that all families would receive similar proportions of good and marginal lands. Families were allowed to do with land rights as they saw fit, e.g. buy, sell, rent, bequeath, or inherit. Cultivation rights for the land were equivalent to stock shares in a village agricultural corporation. Preparatory surveys for redistribution could take months.

Some land was excluded from the process, and might be given to village or district officials, or allowed to lie fallow. In the Tokugawa period, land of minimal use, such as mountains or islands, was saved for individuals facing unforeseeable circumstances, which allowed the system to function as an insurance policy.

Landed was not distributed on a per capita basis but had alternative social functions such as, e.g. controlling risk, providing incentives to encourage participating in other village projects, reducing social conflict, and maximizing tax payments. The system worked most effectively where it was implemented and managed by locals rather than forced by government.

The system declined due to new laws in modern Japan encouraging the privatization of arable land.

== Bibliography ==
- Smitka, Michael. Agricultural Growth and Japanese Economic Development, Taylor & Francis, 1998. ISBN 0-8153-2711-0
