= Miyawaka =

Miyawaka 宮若市
- City
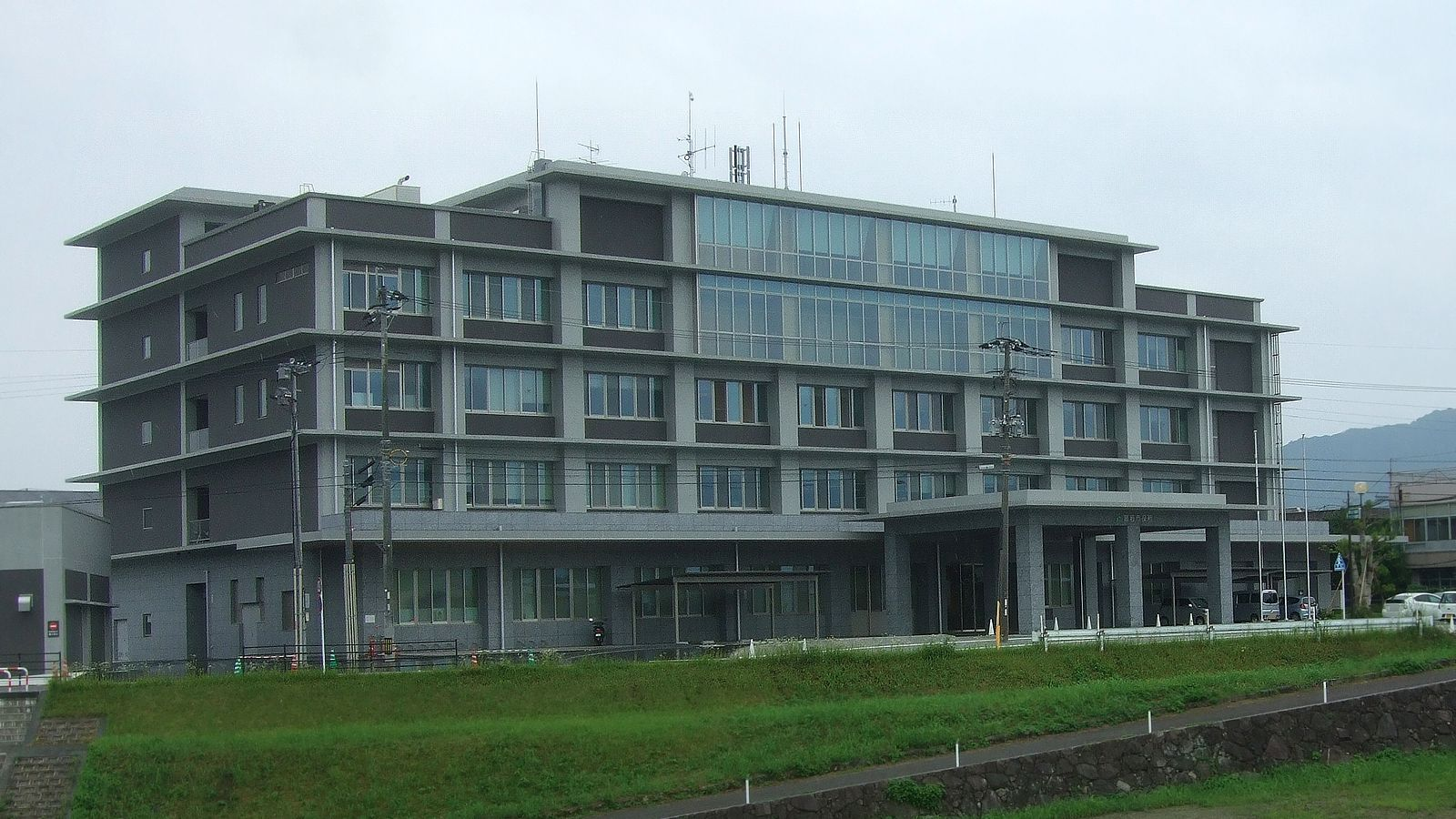
- Miyawaka city hall

- Flag Emblem
- Interactive map of Miyawaka
- Location in Japan
- Coordinates: 33°43′25″N 130°40′03″E
- Country: Japan
- Region: Kyushu
- Prefecture: Fukuoka

Government
  - Mayor: Hidetoshi Shiokawa (from March 2022)

Area
  - Total: 139.99 km^{2} (54.05 sq mi)

Population (January 31, 2023)
  - Total: 26,447
  - Density: 188.92/km^{2} (489.30/sq mi)
- Time zone: UTC+09:00 (JST)
- City hall address: 29-1 Miyata, Miyawaka-shi, Fukuoka-ken 823-0011
- Website: Official website
- Symbols
- Flower: Lycoris radiata
- Tree: Sakura

Miyawaka (宮若市, Miyawaka-shi) is a city located in Fukuoka, Japan. As of 31 January 2024, the city had an estimated population of 26,447 in 13369 households, and a population density of 190 persons per km^{2}. The total area of the city is 139.99 km^{2} (54.05 sq mi).

== Geography ==
Miyawaka is located in the northern Chikuho region and western Naokura district of Fukuoka Prefecture. It is located south of Munakata City, between Kitakyushu City and Fukuoka City, and belongs to both the Kitakyushu Metropolitan Area and the Fukuoka Metropolitan Area. It is approximately 35 kilometers northeast of Fukuoka City and approximately 35 kilometers southwest of Kitakyushu. Historically, it is an area that has had strong ties with Munakata since ancient times.

=== Neighboring municipalities ===
Fukuoka Prefecture

- Fukutsu
- Hisayama
- Iizuka
- Koga
- Kotake
- Kurate
- Munakata
- Nōgata
- Sasaguri

=== Climate ===
Miyawaka has a humid subtropical climate (Köppen Cfa) characterized by warm summers and cool winters with light to no snowfall. The average annual temperature in Miyawaka is 15.4 °C. The average annual rainfall is 1560 mm with September as the wettest month. The temperatures are highest on average in August, at around 26.7 °C, and lowest in January, at around 4.2 °C.

=== Demographics ===
Per Japanese census data, the population of Miyawaka is as shown below

Historical population
Year	Pop.	±%
1940	52,923	—
1950	62,961	+19.0%
1960	64,113	+1.8%
1970	38,562	−39.9%
1980	33,670	−12.7%
1990	32,678	−2.9%
2000	31,225	−4.4%
2010	30,078	−3.7%
2020	26,298	−12.6%

== History ==
The area of Miyawaka was part of ancient Chikuzen Province, and is mentioned in the Nihon Shoki and other Nara period sources as territory of Munakata Shrine. During the Edo Period the area was under the control of Fukuoka Domain. After the Meiji restoration, the villages of Wakaymiya and Miyata were established on May 1, 1889, with the creation of the modern municipalities system. Miyata was raised to town status on April 1, 1926, and Wakamiya on February 11, 1943. The two towns merged on February 11, 2006, to form the city of Miyawaka.

== Government ==
Miyawaka has a mayor-council form of government with a directly elected mayor and a unicameral city council of 16 members. Miyawaka、collectively with the municipalities of Kurate District, Fukuoka contributes one member to the Fukuoka Prefectural Assembly. In terms of national politics, the city is part of the Fukuoka 8th district of the lower house of the Diet of Japan.

== Economy ==
During the Meiji period, Miyawaka, along with the municipalities of the Chikuho area, developed with the Kitakyushu industrial zone through coal mining, and is still considered part of to the Greater Kitakyushu Metropolitan Area. Kaijima Coal Mine, the largest coal mine in Chikuho was located in the former Miyata Town. However, as the demand for coal decreased due to the energy revolution, the coal mines that had sponsored prosperity have closed, leading to depopulation. The last coal mine closed by 1976. After the coal mine closed, an industrial park was created near the Wakamiya Interchange on the Kyushu Expressway in an effort to attract new industries. Since February 1991, Toyota Motor Kyushu has been based in Miyawaka, building both Toyota and Lexus models. Many automobile industry-related factories are now located in the city, making it one of the leading industrial cities in the Kitakyushu industrial area.

== Education ==
Miyawaka has five public elementary schools and two public junior high schools operated by the city government and one public high school operated by the Fukuoka Prefectural Board of Education.

== Transportation ==
=== Railways ===
Following the discontinuation of the JR Kyushu Miyata Line in December 1989, the city not had any passenger railway service. The Kyushu Shinkansen runs through the city, but there are no stations within the city limits.

=== Highways ===
- Kyushu Expressway

== Local attractions ==
- Takehara Kofun, National Historic Site

=== Festivals ===
A firefly festival is held at Nishikura no Oka Sports Park. At the beginning of June, many fireflies dance around the whole park.
