= Toyota Land Cruiser Prado =

Light-duty model in the Toyota Land Cruiser range

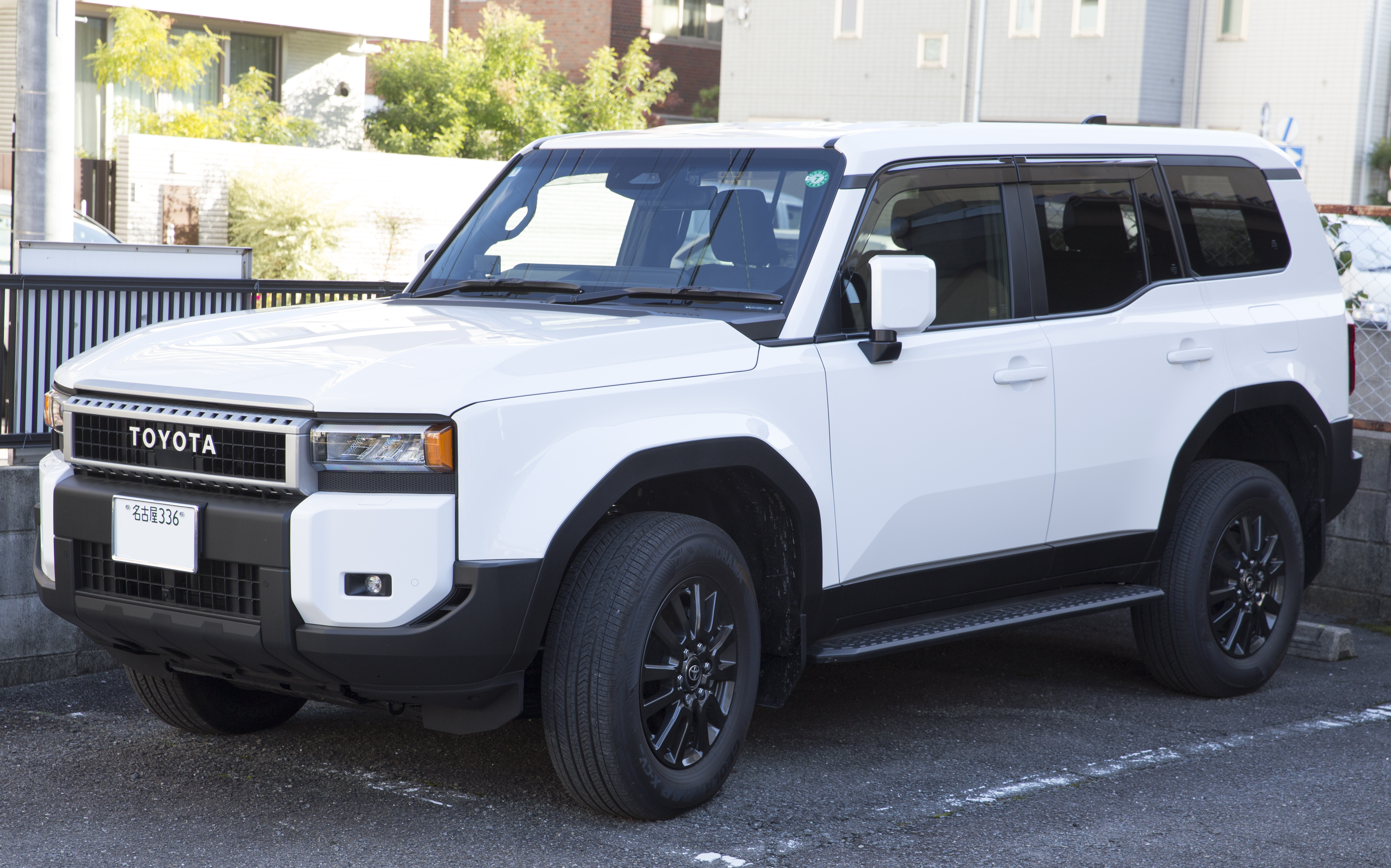
- 2024 Toyota Land Cruiser 250 VX (J250, Japan)

Overview
- Manufacturer: Toyota
- Also called: Toyota Land Cruiser (Europe; Taiwan; North America since 2024); Lexus GX
- Production: 1984–present
- Model years: 1985–present

Body and chassis
- Class: Full-size SUV
- Body style: 3-door SUV (until J150 model); 5-door SUV
- Layout: Front-engine, four-wheel-drive
- Chassis: Body-on-frame

Chronology
- Predecessor: Toyota Land Cruiser II/Bundera

The Toyota Land Cruiser light-duty line, most commonly marketed as the Toyota Land Cruiser Prado (Japanese: トヨタ・ランドクルーザープラド, Hepburn: Toyota Rando-Kurūzā Purado) is a full-size four-wheel drive vehicle in the Land Cruiser range produced by the Japanese automaker Toyota. The Land Cruiser Prado is referred to as a "light-duty" variation in the Land Cruiser range. "Prado" means meadow or field in Spanish and Portuguese.

The Land Cruiser Prado may also be referred to as Land Cruiser LC70, LC90, LC120, LC150 and LC250 depending on the platform. In some markets, it is known simply as the Toyota Prado or the Toyota Land Cruiser.

Up until the J150 model, the Land Cruiser Prado was not part of the Land Cruiser range in North America; the rebadged Lexus GX occupied the Prado's position in luxury trim. The Prado was then introduced there in 2023 and marketed simply as the "Land Cruiser".

The Land Cruiser Prado has a ladder frame chassis, two-speed transfer boxes and a rear beam axle. The J70 platform has a front beam axle, while the J90, J120, J150 and J250 platforms have front independent suspension.

As of 2025, the Land Cruiser Prado is available in most markets served by Toyota. Exceptions include Mexico, India, South Korea and some Southeast Asian and South American markets (where the less expensive Hilux-based Fortuner/SW4 is offered instead).

== Predecessor (J70; 1984) ==
J70
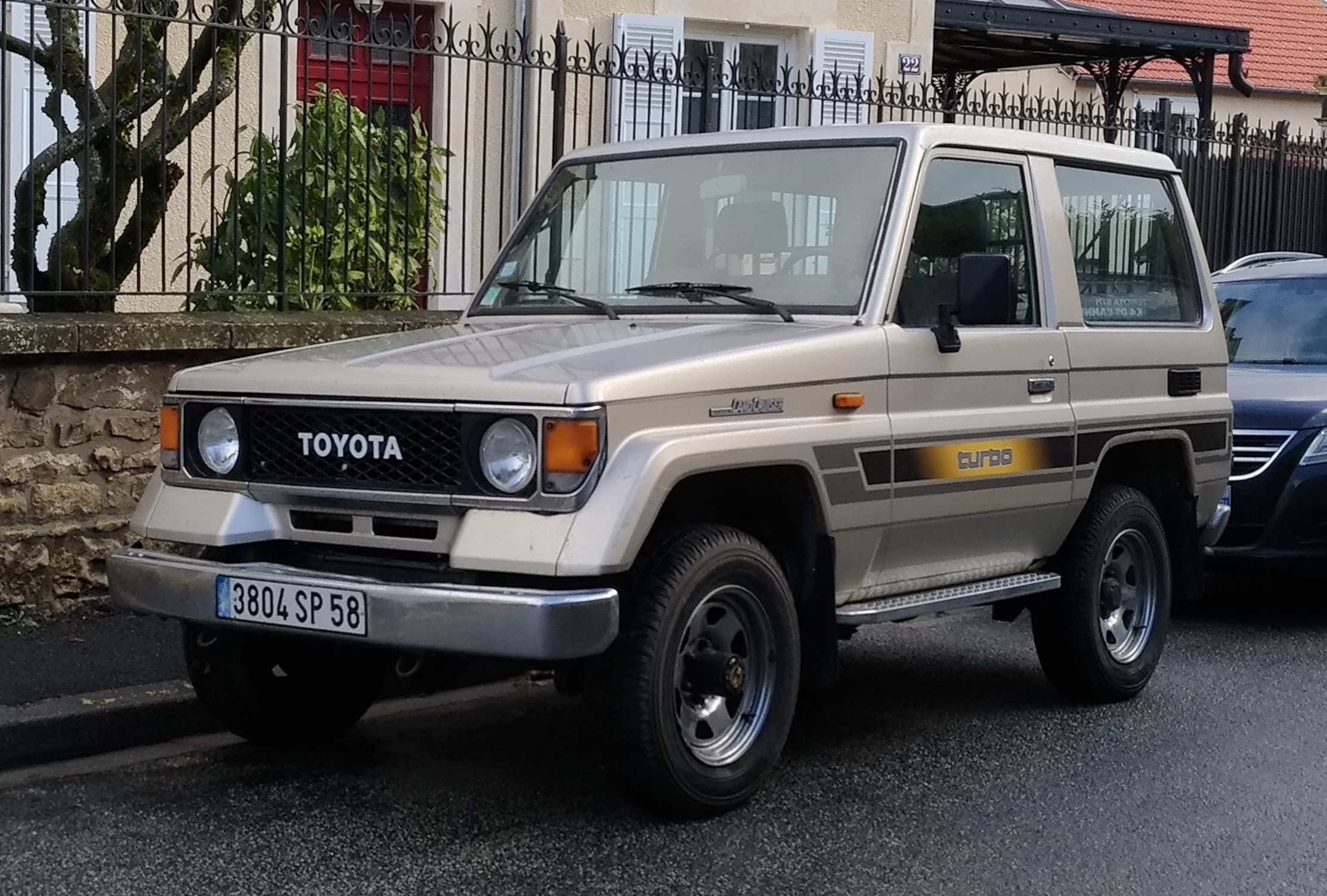
- Land Cruiser 70 Light

Overview
- Also called: Toyota Bundera
- Production: 1984–1990
- Assembly: Japan: Toyota City (ARACO)

Powertrain
- Engine: Petrol: 2.4 L 22R I4; 2.4 L 22R-E I4 (EFI); Diesel: 2.4 L 2L I4; 2.4 L 2L-T I4-T
- Transmission: 5-speed manual

First developed as a light-duty version of the 70 Series in November 1984. Referred to as the Land Cruiser II, Land Cruiser, or Bundera depending on the market it was sold in. They were available only in short body layouts with options for soft top, metal top, or FRP top. The Land Cruiser II uses a coil sprung suspension setup (opposed to the leaf sprung setup in the heavy-duty J70) and lighter-duty axles similar to those found in the 4Runner and Hilux. The Bundera was a short wheelbase—being 2,310 mm (90.9 in)—with two doors, a plastic top, and barn doors at the rear. There were four options for the engine, the 2.4 L (2,366 cc) 22R (carbureted) and 22R-E (EFI) petrol engines and the 2.4 L (2,446 cc) 2L and 2L-T diesel and turbocharged diesel engines. The transmission for the petrol engines is the G52 type while the diesels used the R150 and R151 types. These were the same engines and transmissions used in the 4Runner, in cooperation with Hino.

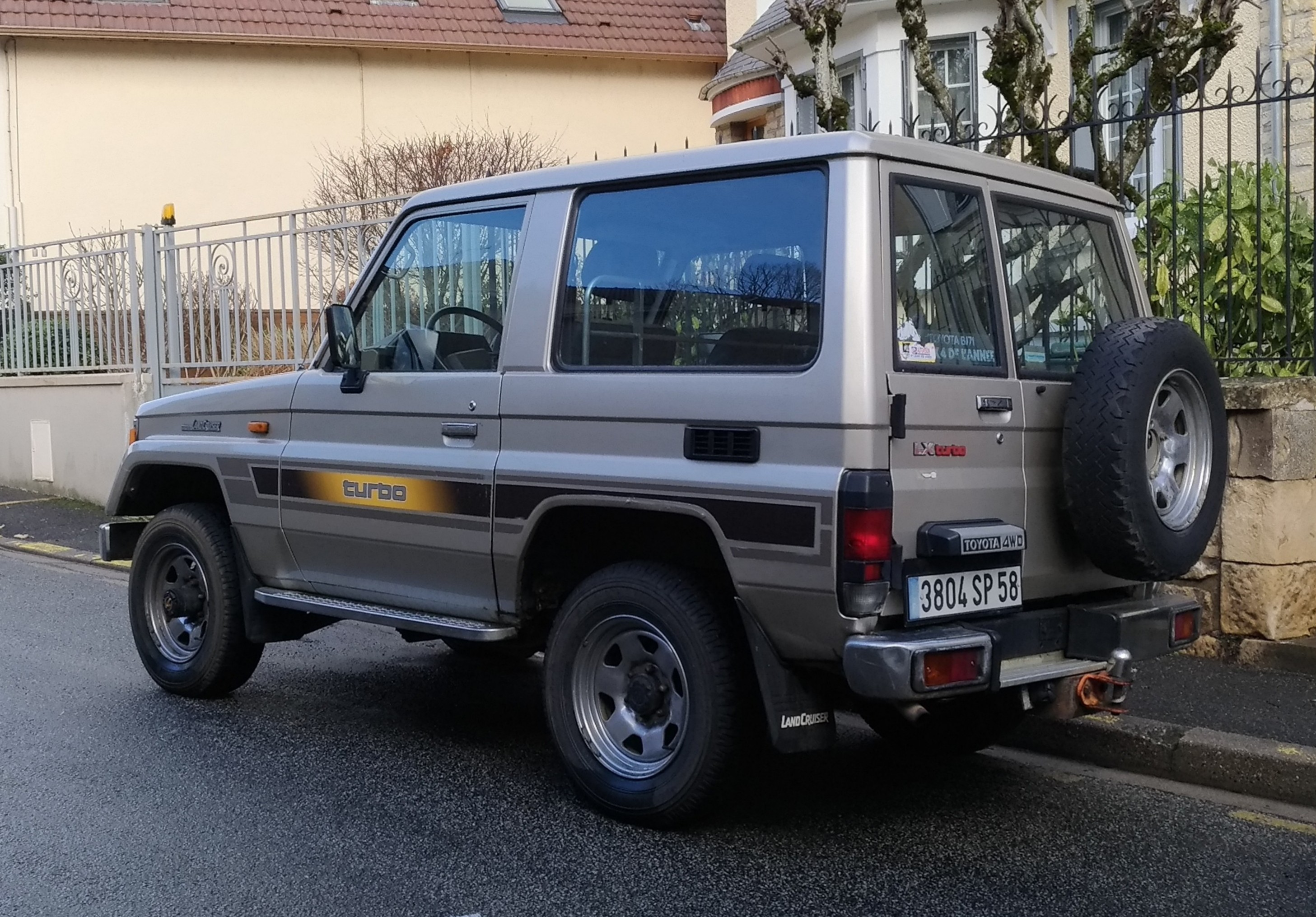
Rear view

== First generation (J70; 1990) ==
First generation
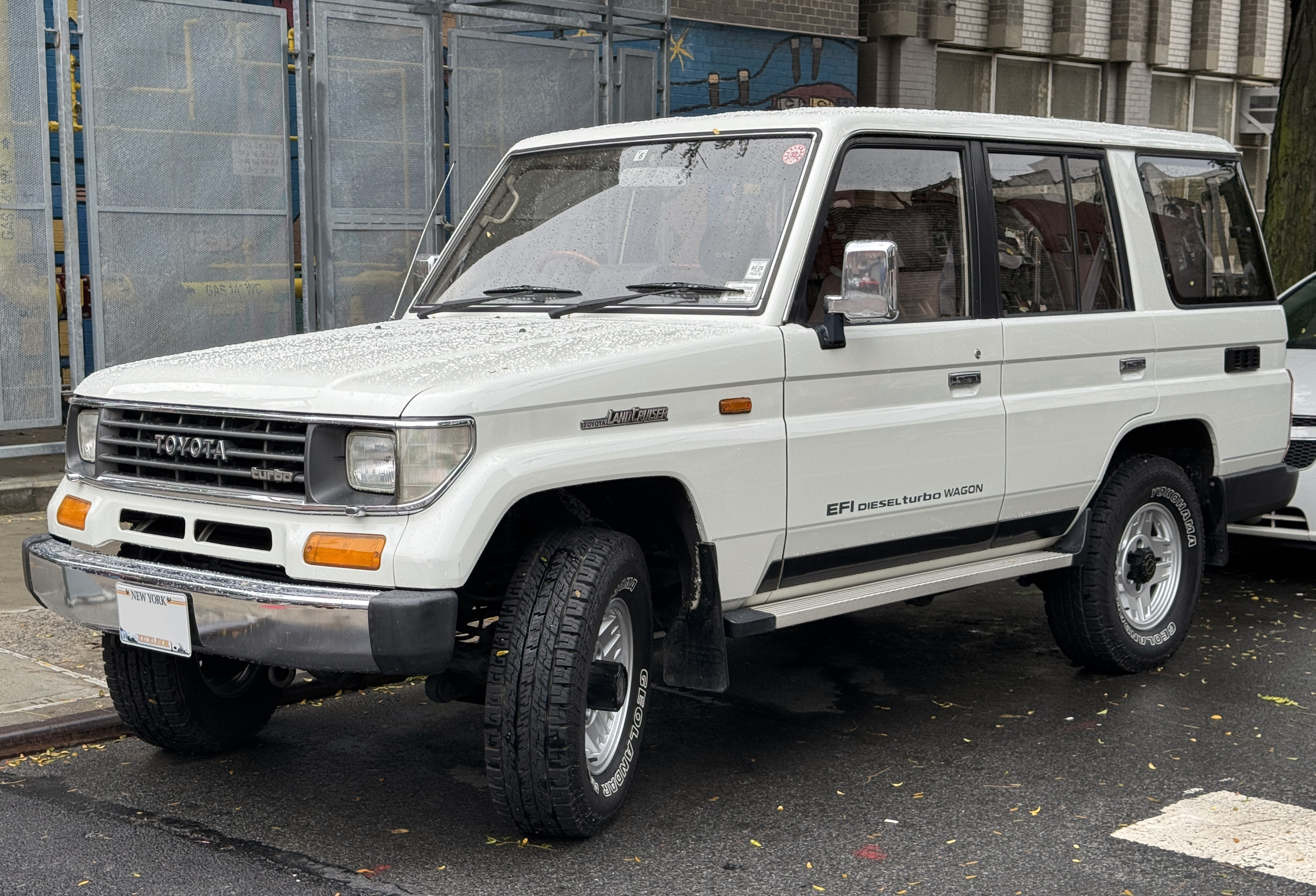
- 1992 Prado SX5 semi long

Overview
- Model code: J70
- Production: 1990–1996
- Assembly: Japan: Toyota City (1990–1992); Tahara, Aichi (1992–1996); Colombia: Envigado (SOFASA)

Powertrain
- Engine: Petrol: 2.4 L 22R-E I4 (EFI); 2.4 L 22R I4 (carb, GCC market); Diesel: 2.4 L 2L-TE I4-T; 2.8 L 3L I4; 3.0 L 1KZ-T I4-T; 3.0 L 1KZ-TE I4-T
- Transmission: 4-speed automatic; 5-speed manual

Dimensions
- Wheelbase: 2,730 mm (107.5 in)
- Length: 4,585 mm (180.5 in)
- Width: 1,690 mm (66.5 in)
- Height: 1,885 mm (74.2 in)
- Kerb weight: 1,890 kg (4,167 lb) (2L-TE)

In April 1990, a new type, the Prado, was introduced, still largely based on the heavy-duty J70 with a redesigned front grille, front wings, engine bonnet, head lamps, and coil sprung suspension carried over from the previous generation Land Cruiser II. Despite being called Prado in Japan, the names Land Cruiser and Land Cruiser II were still used in other parts of the world. While the Prado used a body-on-frame design making it highly capable off-road, the vehicle was nonetheless marketed toward on-road users, unlike core J70 range. The rather underpowered RJ77 (four doors with the 22R carbureted engine) was only available in some Middle Eastern countries.

In Japan, it came with a four-speed automatic or five-speed manual transmission. The only engine installed in home market cars was the 2.4 L turbocharged "EFI" 2L-TE diesel engine with 71 kW (97 PS; 95 hp) and 240 N⋅m (177 lb⋅ft). The lineup included 2-door and 4-door versions, available in SX, LX or EX (4-door only) grades of trim.

The coil spring suspension was carried over from the previous generation Land Cruiser II to improve handling and comfort. The absorber stages could be switched electronically with a button inside. The 22R petrol engine was upgraded to the 22R-E (electronic fuel injection) engine, the diesel engines were replaced by the 2.8 L (2,776 cc) 3L engine, and the 2.4 L (2,446 cc) 2L-T turbocharged diesel engine was replaced by the electronically injected 2L-TE turbocharged diesel engine. In 1993, the 2L-TE turbocharged diesel engine was replaced by the 3.0 L (2,982 cc) 1KZ-TE turbocharged diesel engine with aluminium cylinder head. The 1KZ-TE was able to reduce NO_{x} and soot. The dashboard was replaced with an updated design with minor changes to suspension, brakes and trim details.

=== Gallery ===
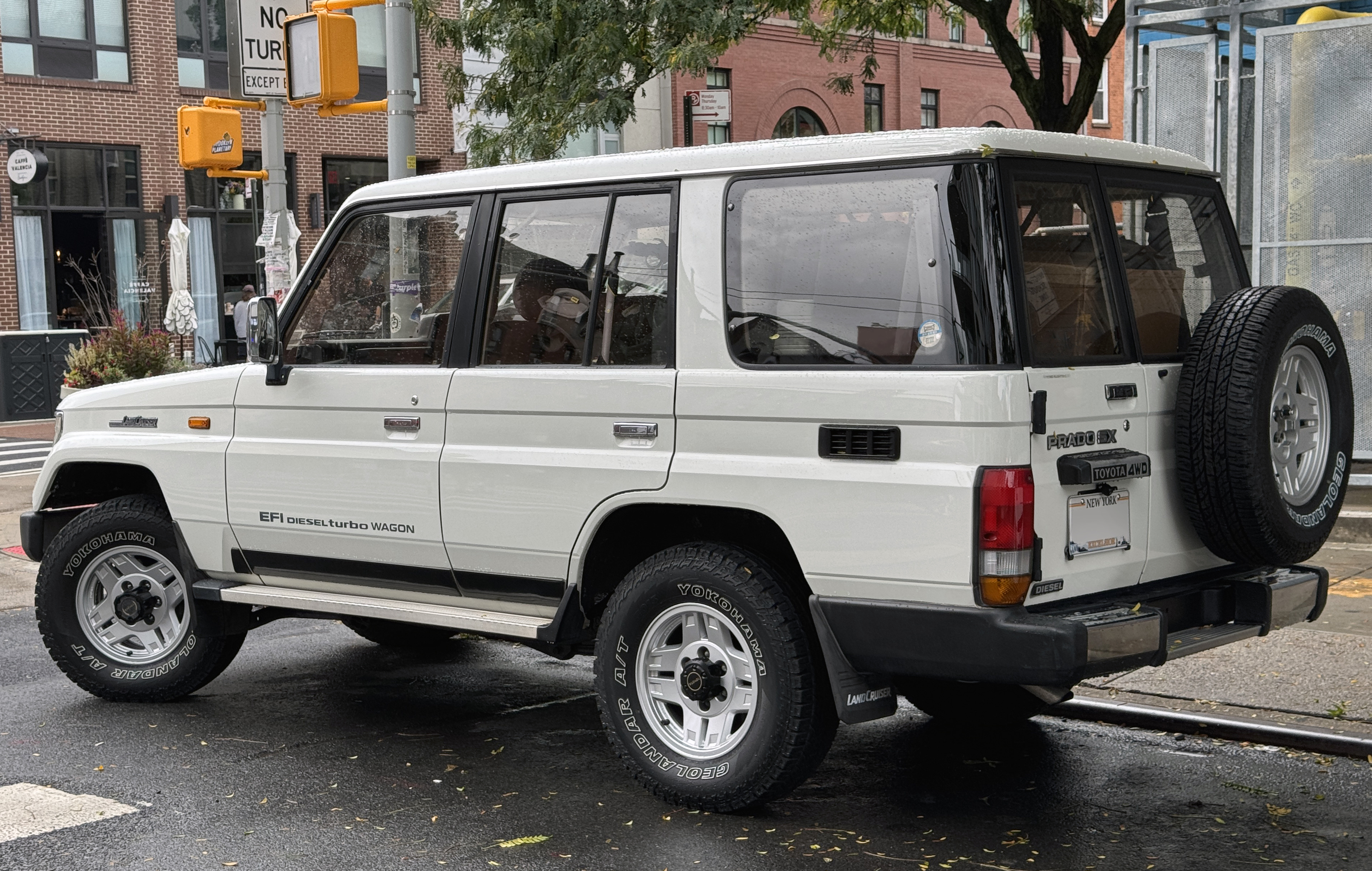
Rear view

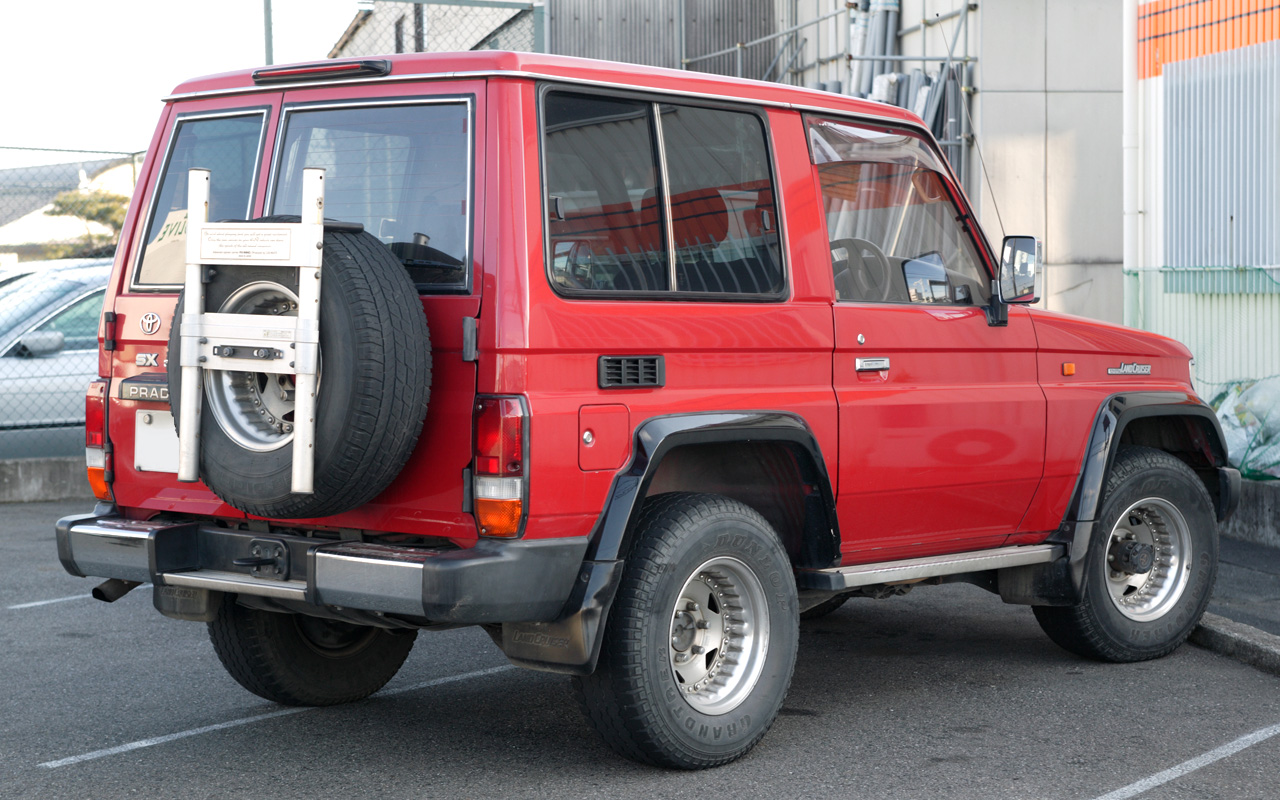
3-door variant

== Second generation (J90; 1996) ==
Second generation
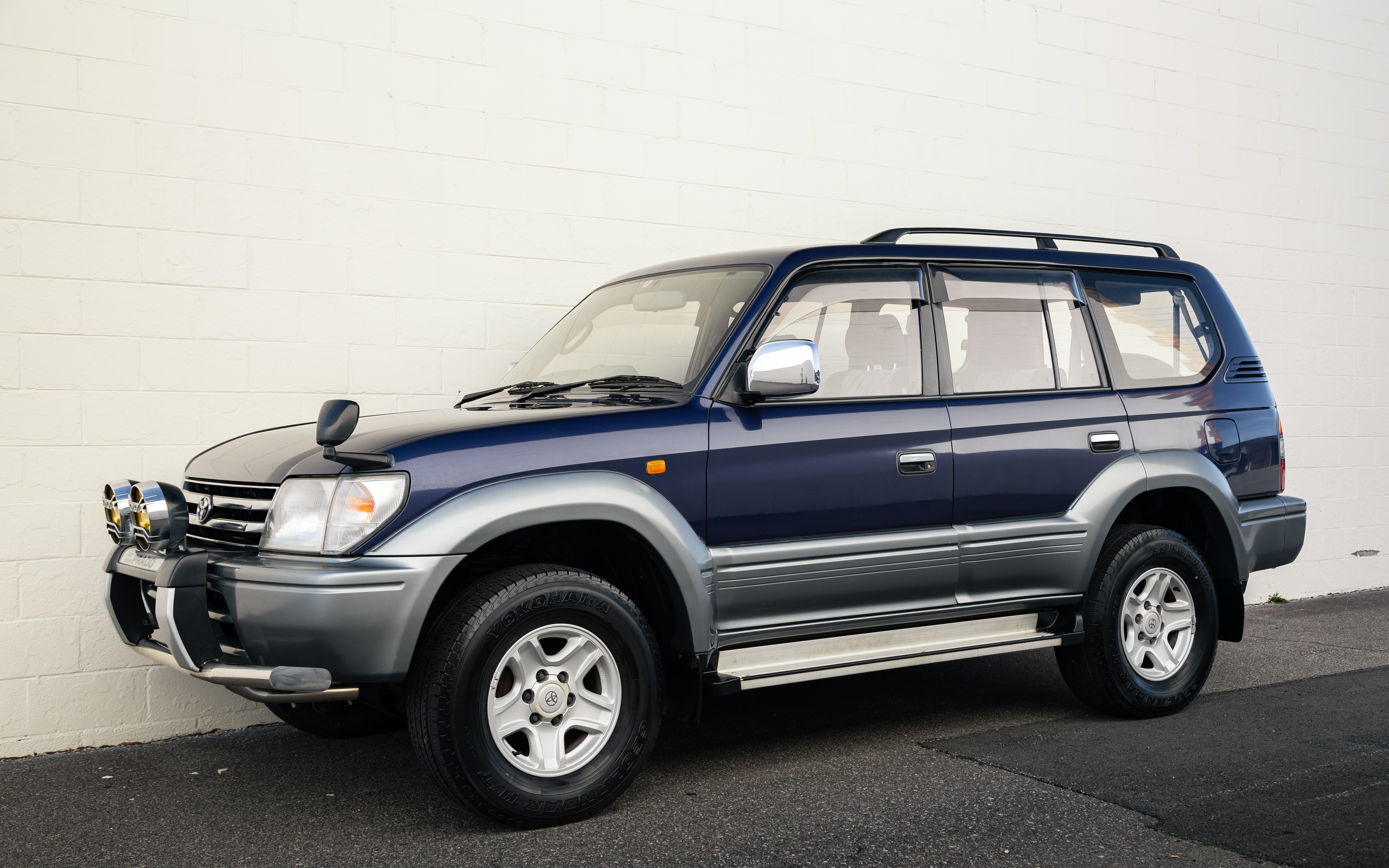
- 1996 Prado TX 5-door (KZJ95; pre-facelift, Japan)

Overview
- Model code: J90
- Also called: Toyota Merú (Venezuela; 3-door); Toyota Land Cruiser Colorado (UK)
- Production: 1996–2002; 1999–2009 (Colombia)
- Assembly: Japan: Toyota City (Honsha plant) Tahara, Aichi (Tahara plant); Malaysia: Shah Alam, Selangor (ASSB) UMW Toyota Motor (assembled as manual only); Colombia: Envigado (Sofasa)

Body and chassis
- Related: Toyota 4Runner (N180); BAW XB624; BAW Luba; BAW K625T (pickup truck)

Powertrain
- Engine: Petrol: 2.7 L 3RZ-F/3RZ-FE I4; 3.4 L 5VZ-FE V6; Diesel: 2.8 L 3L I4; 3.0 L 5L I4; 3.0 L 1KZ-TE turbo I4; 3.0 L 1KD-FTV turbo I4
- Transmission: 4-speed automatic; 5-speed manual

Dimensions
- Wheelbase: 2,370 mm (93.3 in) (3-door); 2,675 mm (105.3 in) (5-door)
- Length: 4,240 mm (166.9 in) (3-door); 4,675 mm (184.1 in) (5-door, 1996–1999); 4,690 mm (184.6 in) (5-door, 1999–2002)
- Width: 1,820 mm (71.7 in)
- Height: 1,880 mm (74.0 in)
- Kerb weight: 3-door: 1,740 kg (3,836 lb); 5-door: 1,890–1,960 kg (4,167–4,321 lb)

The second-generation Prado was released on 8 May 1996 and sold in Japan through Toyota and Toyota Vista dealerships. Unlike the J70-based first generation, the J90 was an independent series, and Toyota describes the model change as the point at which the Prado was directed towards a more passenger-oriented four-wheel drive vehicle. Production took place at the company's Honsha and Tahara plants.

Two body styles were offered: a three-door short wheelbase five-seater and a five-door long wheelbase eight-seater. Both were larger than their predecessors and fell into the Japanese "3-number" registration class. Toyota differentiated them visually through the front-end and headlamp treatment, giving the short-bodied car a sportier appearance and the long-bodied car a more rugged one.

The drivetrain changed from part-time to full-time four-wheel drive, and the suspension was shared with the Hilux Surf, using independent double wishbones with coil springs at the front and a four-link coil-sprung live axle with a lateral rod at the rear. In Japan, three-door grades were designated with an initial R, ranging from RZ, RX and RS to RJ, while five-door grades used an initial T, from TZ, TX and TS to TJ. ABS and a Field Monitor showing an altimeter, a thermometer and pressure were fitted.

Representative Japanese-market specifications at launch were as follows.

Grade	Model code	Engine	Displacement	Maximum output	Kerb weight
5-door TZ	E-VZJ95W-GKPGK	5VZ-FE V6 DOHC	3.4 L (3,378 cc)	136 kW (185 PS; 182 hp) at 4,800 rpm	1,890 kg (4,167 lb)
5-door TZ	KD-KZJ95W-GKMGK	1KZ-TE I4 turbo	3.0 L (2,982 cc)	103 kW (140 PS; 138 hp) at 3,600 rpm	1,960 kg (4,321 lb)
3-door RZ	E-VZJ90W-GJMGK	5VZ-FE V6 DOHC	3.4 L (3,378 cc)	136 kW (185 PS; 182 hp) at 4,800 rpm	1,740 kg (3,836 lb)

=== Engines ===
At launch, the range comprised a newly introduced 3.4-litre 5VZ-FE V6 DOHC petrol engine producing 136 kW (185 PS; 182 hp), and the 3.0-litre 1KZ-TE four-cylinder SOHC turbo-diesel carried over from the previous generation, whose output was raised to 103 kW (140 PS; 138 hp) by the addition of an intercooler. A 2.7-litre 3RZ-FE four-cylinder DOHC petrol engine producing 110 kW (150 PS; 148 hp) was added in April 1997. Other diesel engine includes the 2.8-litre 3L and 3.0-litre 5L engine, and both diesel engine belongs to Toyota L-series engine.

In July 2000, the 3.0-litre 1KZ-TE turbo-diesel engine was replaced by the newly developed 3.0-litre 1KD-FTV, a common rail direct-injection unit marketed as D-4D. Toyota attributed its performance to four-valve cylinder heads, a newly developed common-rail injection system and an intercooled variable-nozzle turbocharger with continuously controlled boost pressure, together with a combustion process designated UNIBUS which the company credited with reducing both fuel consumption and the vibration and noise characteristic of diesel engines. All manual-transmission models, and automatics with a kerb weight of 2,020 kg (4,453 lb) or more, met Japan's 2005 diesel fuel economy standards ahead of their introduction, and an immobiliser was adopted at the same time. The engine produced 125 kW (170 PS; 168 hp) at 3,400 rpm and 352 N⋅m (260 lb⋅ft) between 1,800 and 3,400 rpm.

=== 1999 revisions ===
The J90 received a minor change on 9 June 1999. Both body styles adopted large multi-reflector headlamps, and the front and rear combination lamps were given clear lenses. The front grille, front bumper, door trim and combination meter were redesigned, and new exterior and interior colours were introduced. An Optitron instrument cluster was newly offered and the Field Monitor was revised to a colour display. Toyota also introduced "Active TRC", a traction mechanism intended to improve progress on loose and muddy surfaces, and offered vehicle stability control on principal automatic grades from August 1999.

A special edition designated "TX Limited" was launched simultaneously, based on the five-door eight-seat TX and adding a roof rail, wood-grain trim, an armrest rear console box and an Optitron meter. Toyota set a monthly sales target of 3,000 units for the revised range. Overall length of five-door models increased to 4,690 mm (184.6 in).

=== Special-equipment variants ===
==== Crawler ====
On 22 October 1999 Toyota announced a Land Cruiser Prado Crawler, sold from 1 November 1999 as a factory special-equipment vehicle under the company's TECS (Toyota Excellent Conversion Series) programme, alongside an equivalent Hilux Surf Crawler. The Crawler replaced all four road wheels with triangular rubber-belted crawler units, and was intended for passenger transport and haulage in snowbound areas.

Because the conversion substituted the wheels without altering the vehicle's basic control layout, Toyota stated that the Crawler could be driven on an ordinary Japanese driving licence, unlike tracked snow vehicles, which were classified as special vehicles requiring a specific licence. The crawler units could be removed and road wheels refitted outside the snow season. Changes to the base vehicle included dedicated front and rear bumpers, enlarged over-fenders, protectors and stoppers, and a switch to correct the speedometer reading between crawler and wheel configurations.

The Crawler was based on the 3.4-litre 5VZ-FE petrol TZ grade, carried the TECS model code GF-VZJ95W-VRPGCR, and was bodied by Araco. Fitting the crawler units raised kerb weight from 1,980 kg (4,365 lb) to 2,420 kg (5,335 lb) and ground clearance from 230 mm (9.1 in) to 330 mm (13.0 in). At launch it was priced at ¥5,240,000 excluding consumption tax.

==== Active Vacation ====
A camper conversion marketed as "Active Vacation" was offered as a special-equipment vehicle registered in Japan's 8-number category, and received the same revisions as the base vehicle at the June 1999 minor change.

=== Markets ===
==== South American ====
===== Colombia =====
The Prado was made a launch in Colombia in 1999. It was assembled by Sofasa until 2009 without significant changes. There were two versions, a 3-door version with a 2.7 L engine and a 5-door version with a 3.4 L V6 engine and either a 5-speed manual or a 4-speed automatic transmission. Between 2005 and 2009, they offered an optional armoured version of the 5-door Prado.

==== Southeast Asia ====
===== Malaysia =====
In Malaysia, the Prado was launched in 1996. Initially imported by Japan, it offers all grades, alongside a diesel engine. It was later assembled by UMW Toyota in Shah Alam, Selangor. It offered the GX grade, 2.7 L petrol engine and 5-speed manual transmission.

===== Philippines =====
The Prado was launched in the Philippines. It was the first ever Prado to be sold in the country.

==== Europe ====
===== United Kingdom =====
The Prado was launched in the UK in 1996 as the Land Cruiser Colorado. It replaced the 4Runner and previous generation Land Cruiser II, which had been discontinued from sale. It was called this to distinguish it from the larger Land Cruiser (sold as the Land Cruiser Amazon nameplate) which was already on sale. The Colorado was configured with both three- and five door, and offered 3.0 L turbodiesel and 3.4 L V6 petrol engine. The Colorado name tag was dropped in 2003, when it was renamed simply as Land Cruiser. In the Republic of Ireland, most Land Cruisers were sold as commercial vehicles with the rear side windows blanked and the rear seats removed for tax reasons.

=== Gallery ===
==== Pre-facelift ====
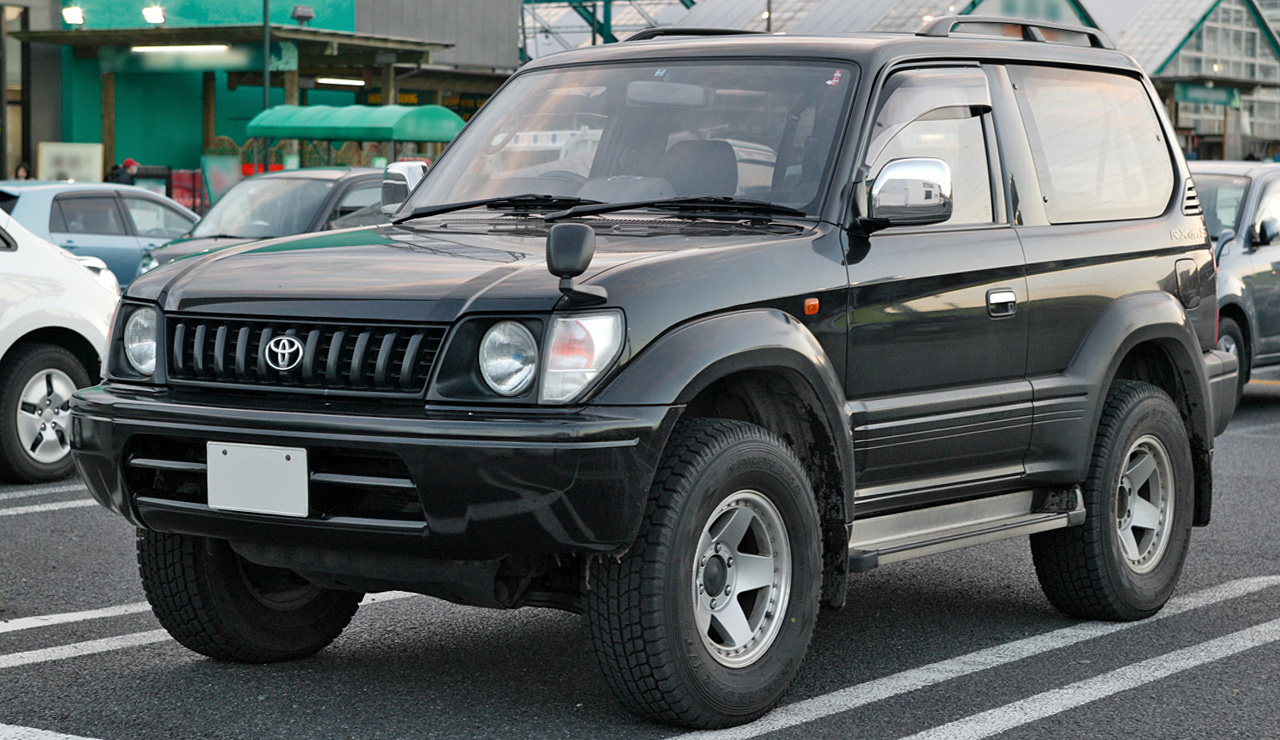
Prado 3-door 2.7 RX Type S (RZJ90W, Japan)

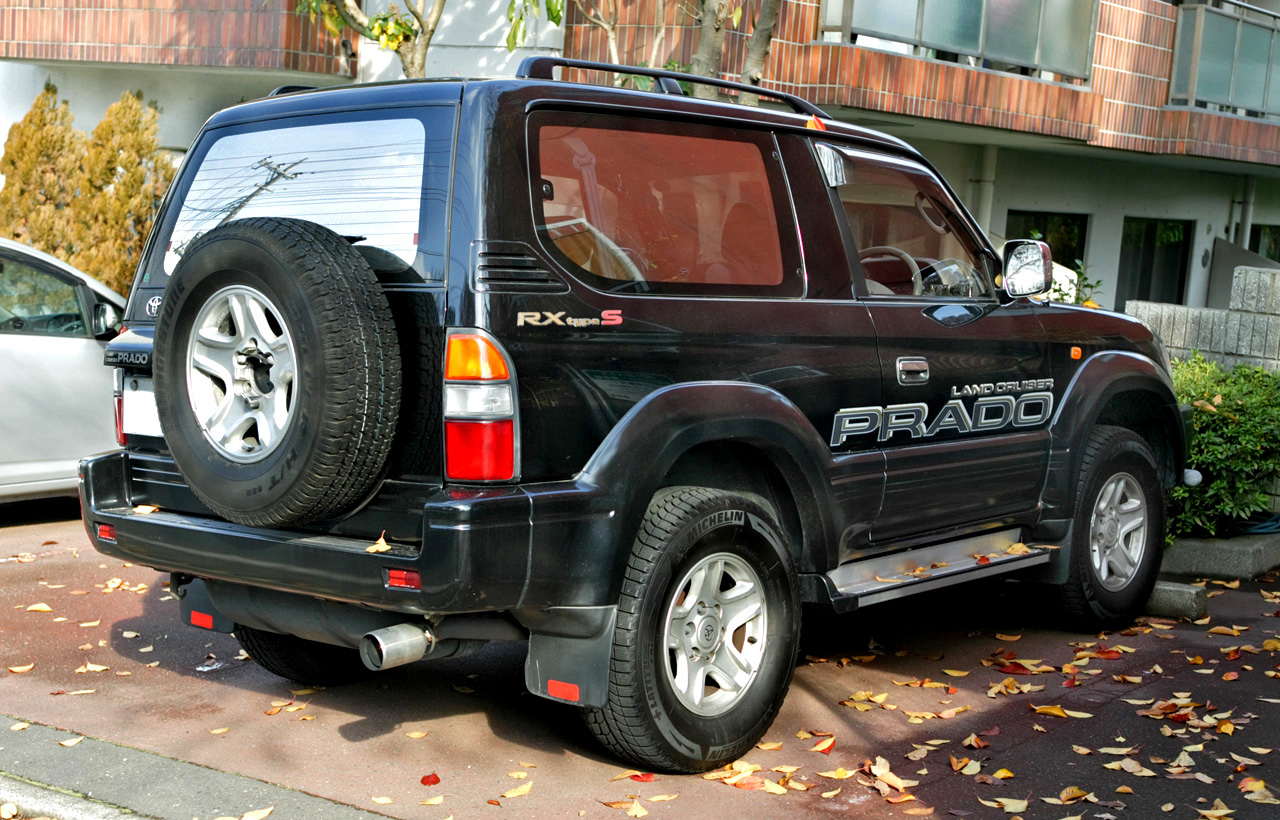
Prado 3-door 2.7 RX Type S (RZJ90W, Japan)

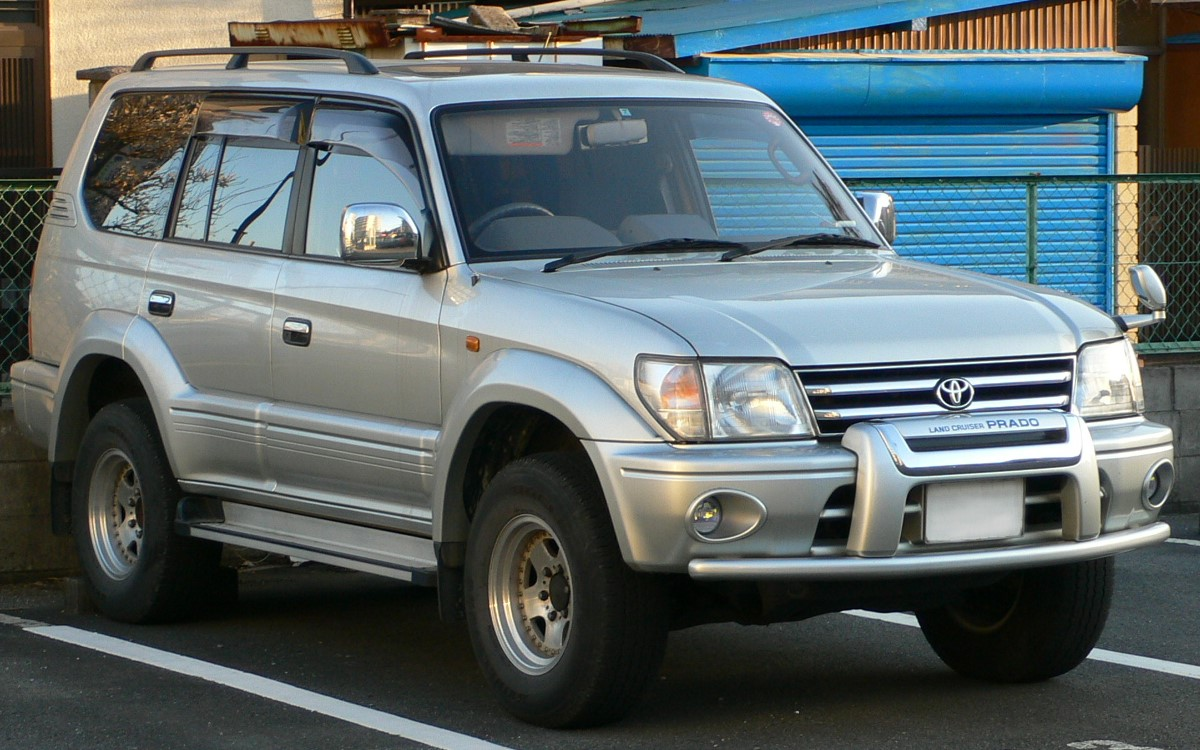
1996 Prado 5-door (Japan)

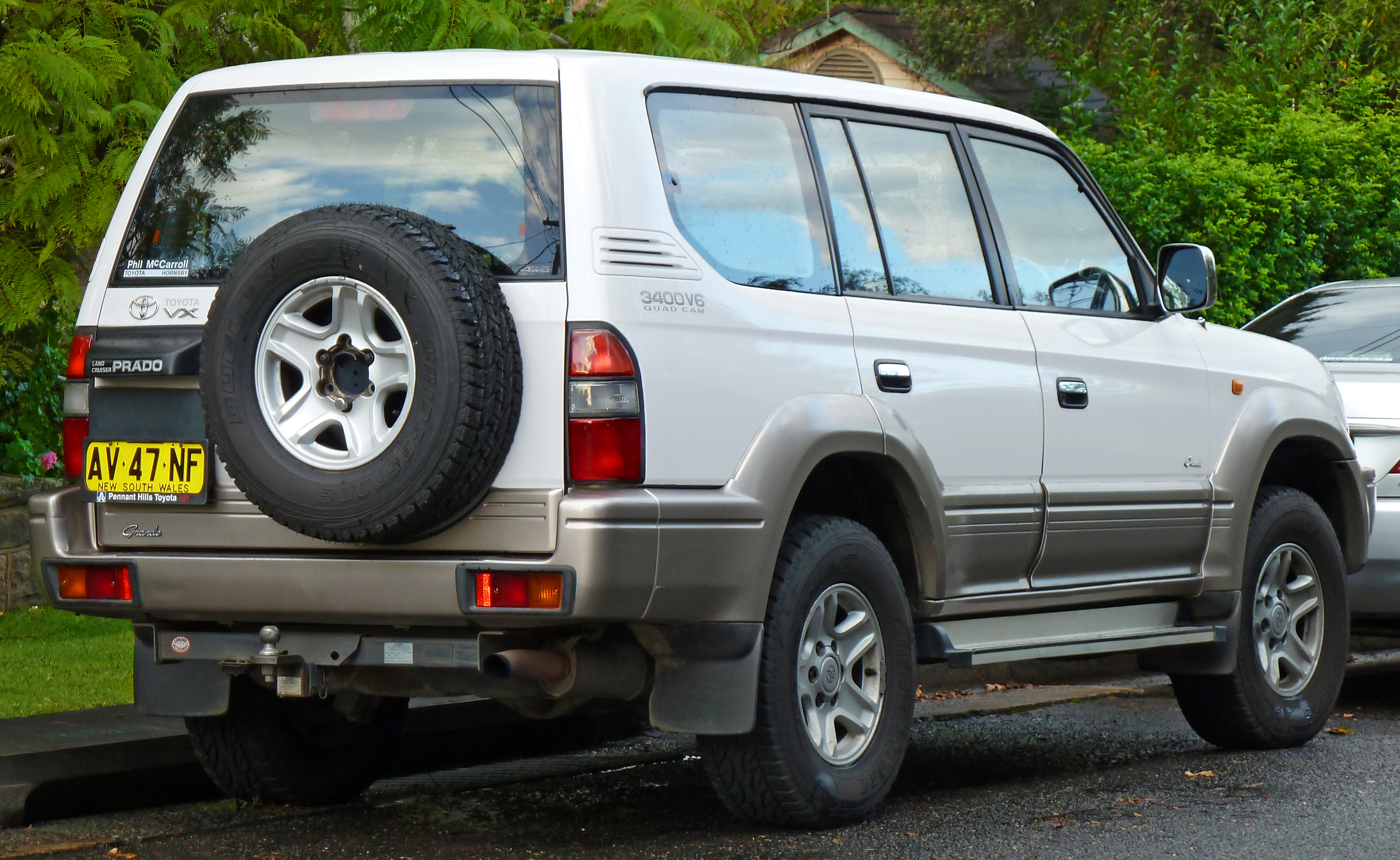
1998 Prado VX Grande (VZJ95, Australia)

==== Facelift ====
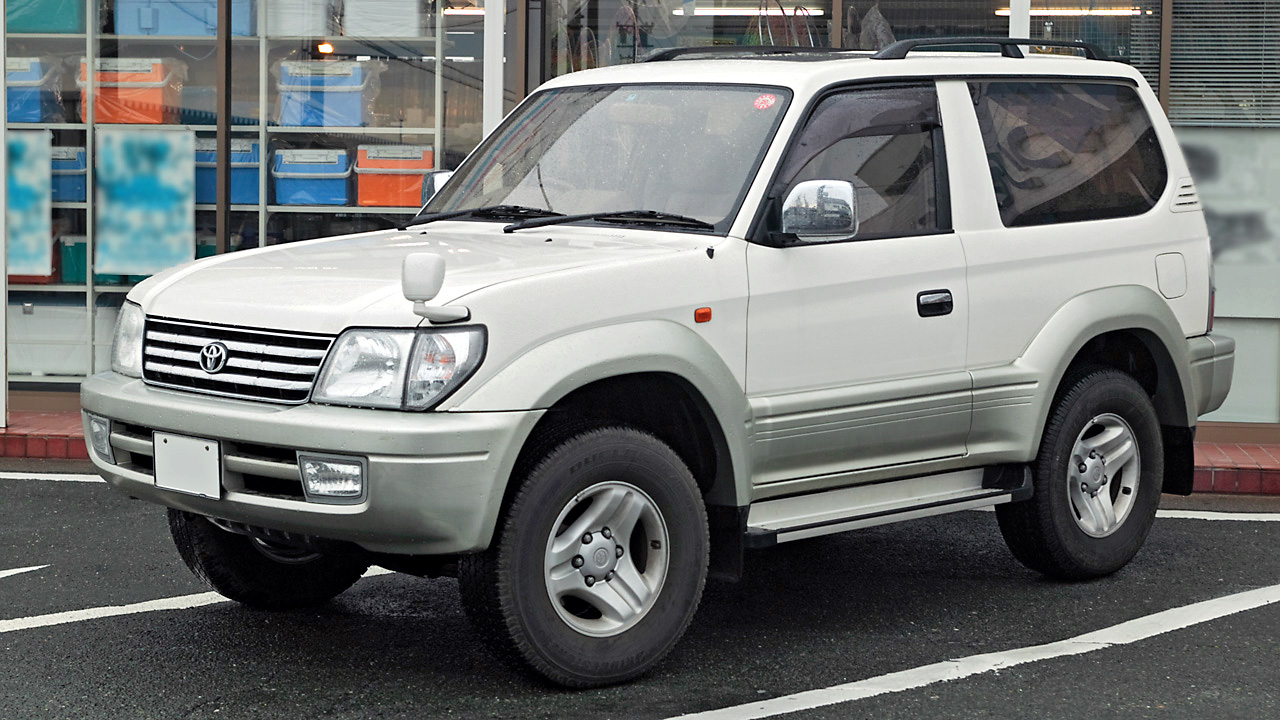
Prado 3-door 3.4DT RZ (VZJ90W, Japan)

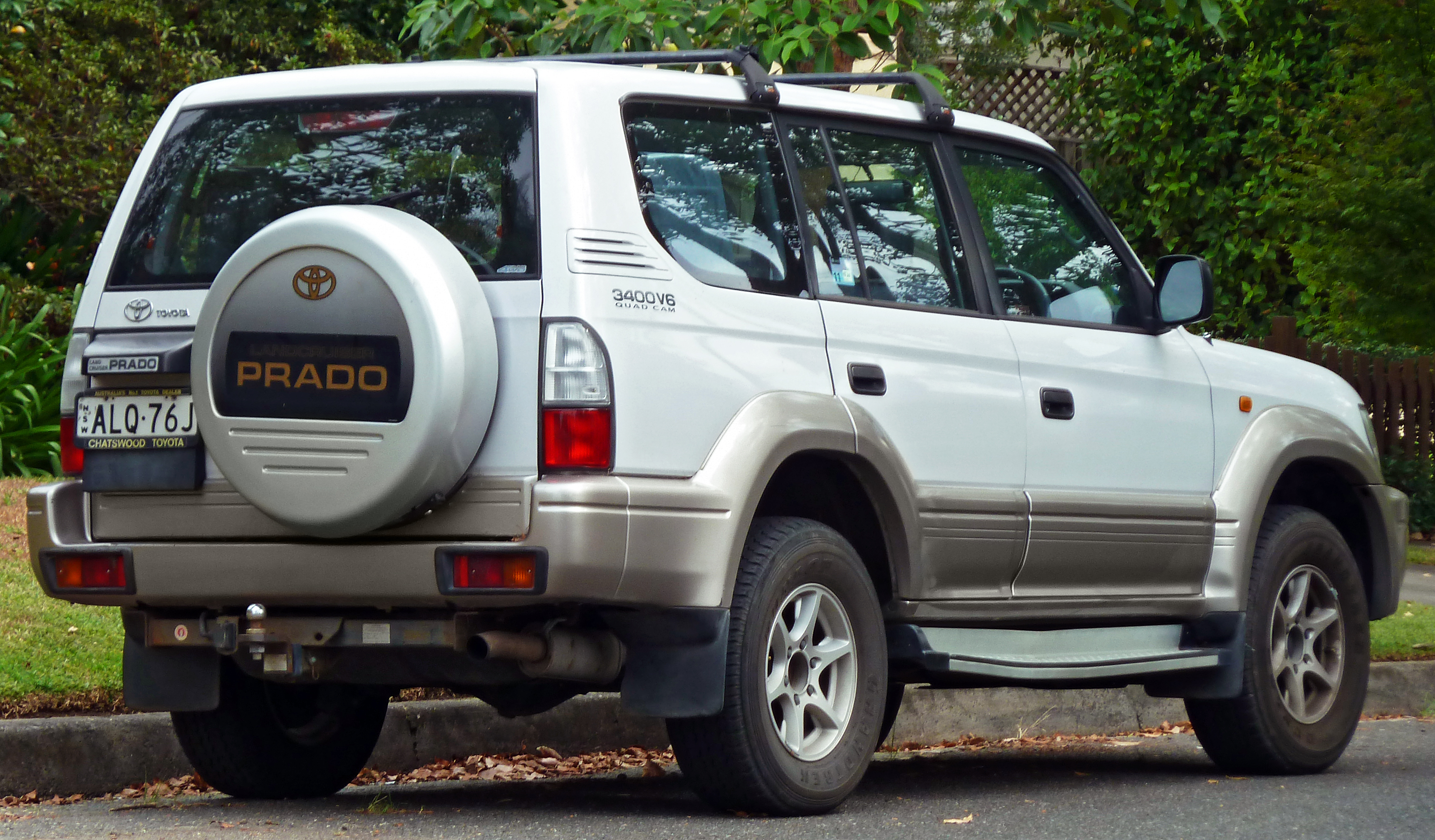
2002 Prado GXL (VZJ95, Australia)

==== Land Cruiser Colorado ====
1998 Colorado 3.0 GXTD (KZJ95, UK)

== Third generation (J120; 2002) ==
Third generation
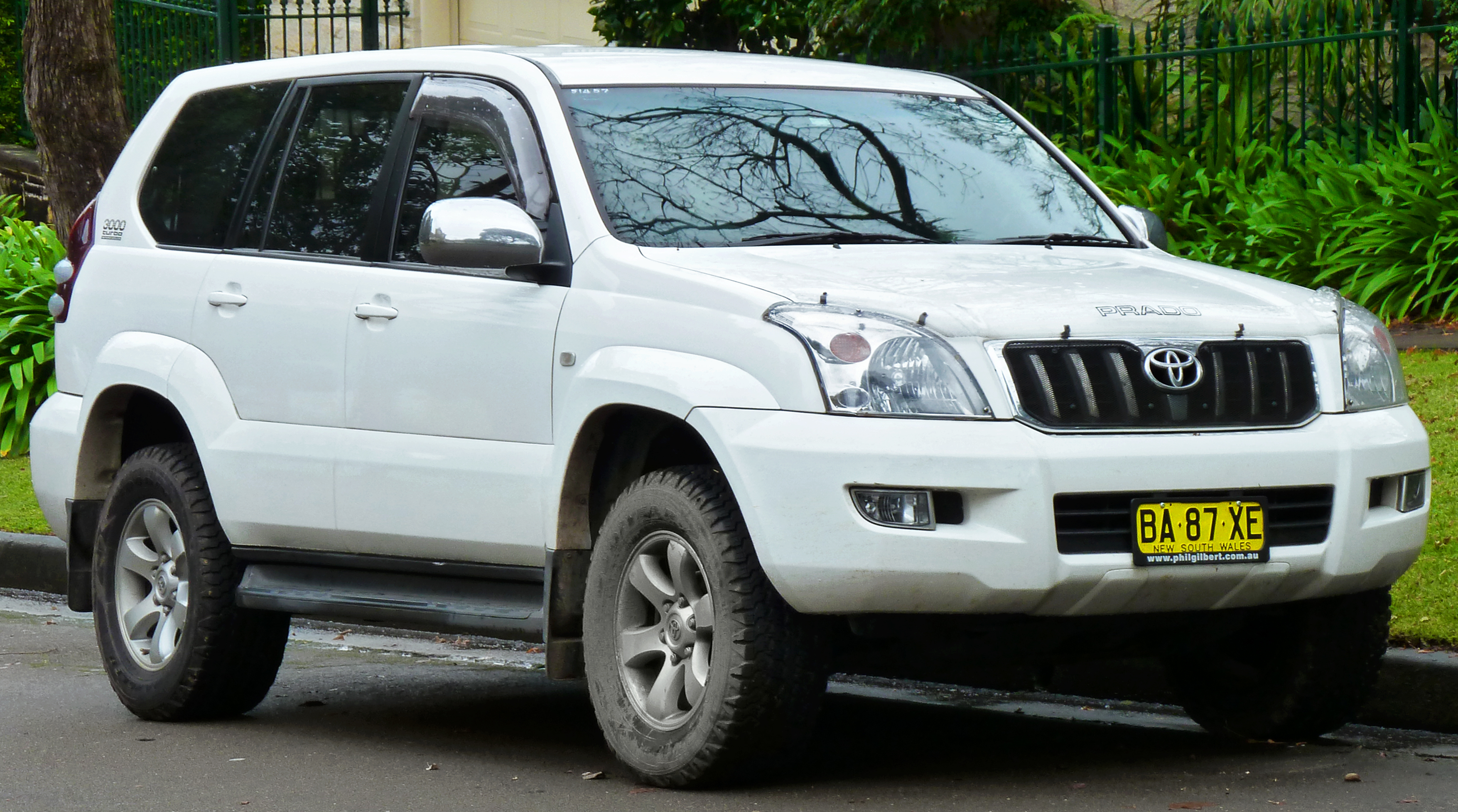
- 2005 Prado GXL (KZJ120, Australia)

Overview
- Model code: J120
- Also called: Lexus GX 470
- Production: September 2002 – August 2009
- Assembly: East Asia; Japan: Tahara, Aichi; China: Chengdu (SFTM)
- Designer: Lance Scott (1999, 2000)

Body and chassis
- Platform: Toyota F2
- Related: Toyota 4Runner (N210); Toyota FJ Cruiser

Powertrain
- Engine: Petrol: 2.7 L 3RZ-FE I4; 2.7 L 2TR-FE I4; 3.4 L 5VZ-FE V6; 4.0 L 1GR-FE V6; Diesel: 3.0 L 5L-E I4; 3.0 L 1KZ-TE I4-T; 3.0 L 1KD-FTV I4-T
- Transmission: 4/5-speed automatic; 5/6-speed manual

Dimensions
- Wheelbase: 2,455 mm (96.7 in) (3-door); 2,790 mm (109.8 in) (5-door)
- Length: 4,340 mm (170.9 in) (3-door); 4,715 mm (185.6 in) (5-door); 4,850 mm (190.9 in) (5-door) (external spare with hard cover)
- Width: 1,790–1,875 mm (70.5–73.8 in)
- Height: 1,855–1,895 mm (73.0–74.6 in)
- Curb weight: 1,790–2,030 kg (3,946–4,475 lb)

Appearing in 2002, the third generation Prado has revised front suspension to improve reliability. Development began in 1997 and design work in 1998, with the proposal originating from Lance Scott of the Toyota ED^{2} design studio in France in late 1999.

Engines include the 2.7 L (2,693 cc) straight-4 3RZ-FE, 3.4 L (3,378 cc) V-6 5VZ-FE and 3.0 L (2,982 cc) straight-4 turbocharged diesel 1KZ-TE. In countries like China, a newly developed engine (1GR-FE V6) is available. The engine immobilizer became standard equipment in some markets.

In August 2004, the 3RZ-FE engine was replaced by the 2.7 L (2,694 cc) 2TR-FE engine and in July of the same year, the 5VZ-FE engine was replaced by the 4.0 L (3,955 cc) V6 1GR-FE engine with a 5-speed automatic transmission available in late 2005.

North America never received the Prado nameplate but it was sold as the Lexus GX 470 with the 4.7 L (4,663 cc) V8 2UZ-FE engine and full time four wheel drive.

Diesel models have had the 1KZ-TE turbocharged diesel engine with maximum output rating at 96 kW (131 PS; 129 hp) as well as the 5L-E natural aspirated diesel engine rated at 70 kW (95 PS; 94 hp). In November 2006, Toyota introduced the 1KD-FTV turbocharged diesel D-4D engine to meet Euro IV emission standards. This engine delivers 127 kW (173 PS; 170 hp) of power and 410 N⋅m (302 lbf⋅ft) of torque. The upgrade to the D-4D engine was also matched with transmission upgrades to the diesel range, with the 5-speed automatic and 6-speed manual transmissions added in line with the petrol powered range. From August 2007 the Prado received several equipment and safety upgrades. The car has won 3 awards for the best performance from an SUV-type vehicle in Australia and the US.

The 120-series Land Cruiser Prado shares the same suspension parts as the Hilux Surf/4Runner and FJ Cruiser from the same years.

There is a shorter three-door version referred to as the J125. Engines and most features are the same; just the 1KZ-TE was only available in the five-door version. The three-door model features only two seat rows. The fuel tank is limited to 87 L, with no sub-fuel-tank system available.

In 2007 on Japanese models only, G-BOOK, a subscription telematics service, was offered as an option.

The Japanese market Prado consisted of 6 trim levels known as RX, RZ, TX, TX Limited, TZ and TZ 'G Selection'. The highest specification model known as TZ 'G Selection' consisted of features like front driver and passenger heated seats, heated exterior mirrors, adjustable air suspension, hill start assist control downhill assist control, central differential lock and sometimes engine auto heating.

=== Gallery ===
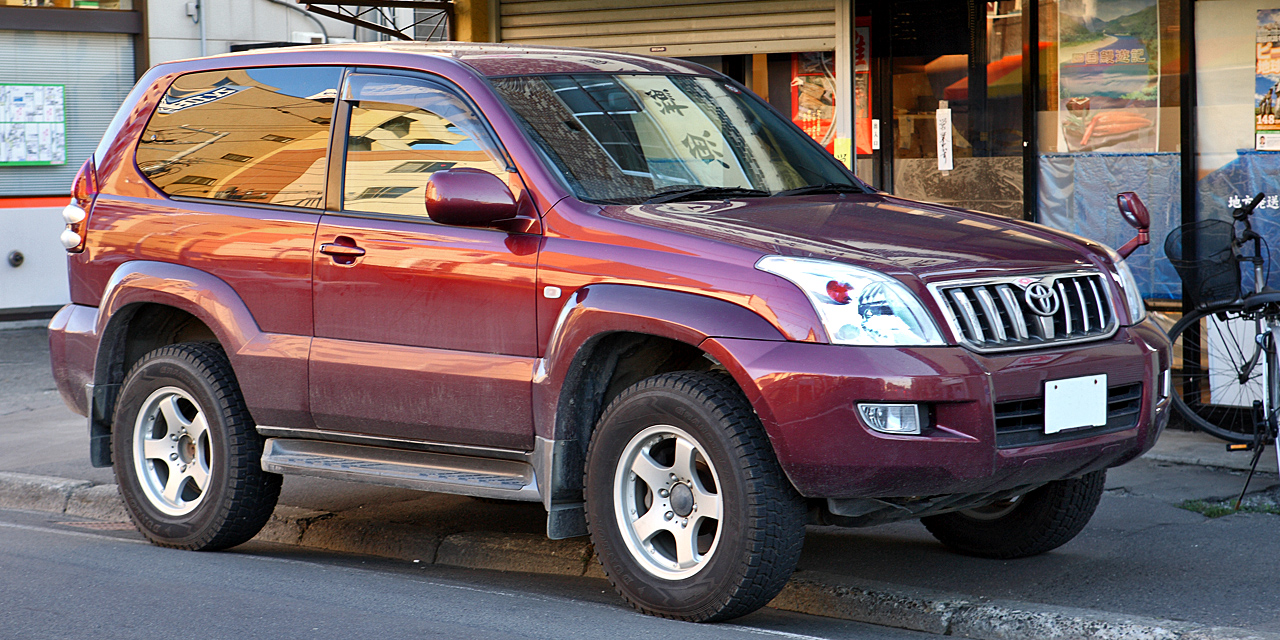
3-door (Japan)

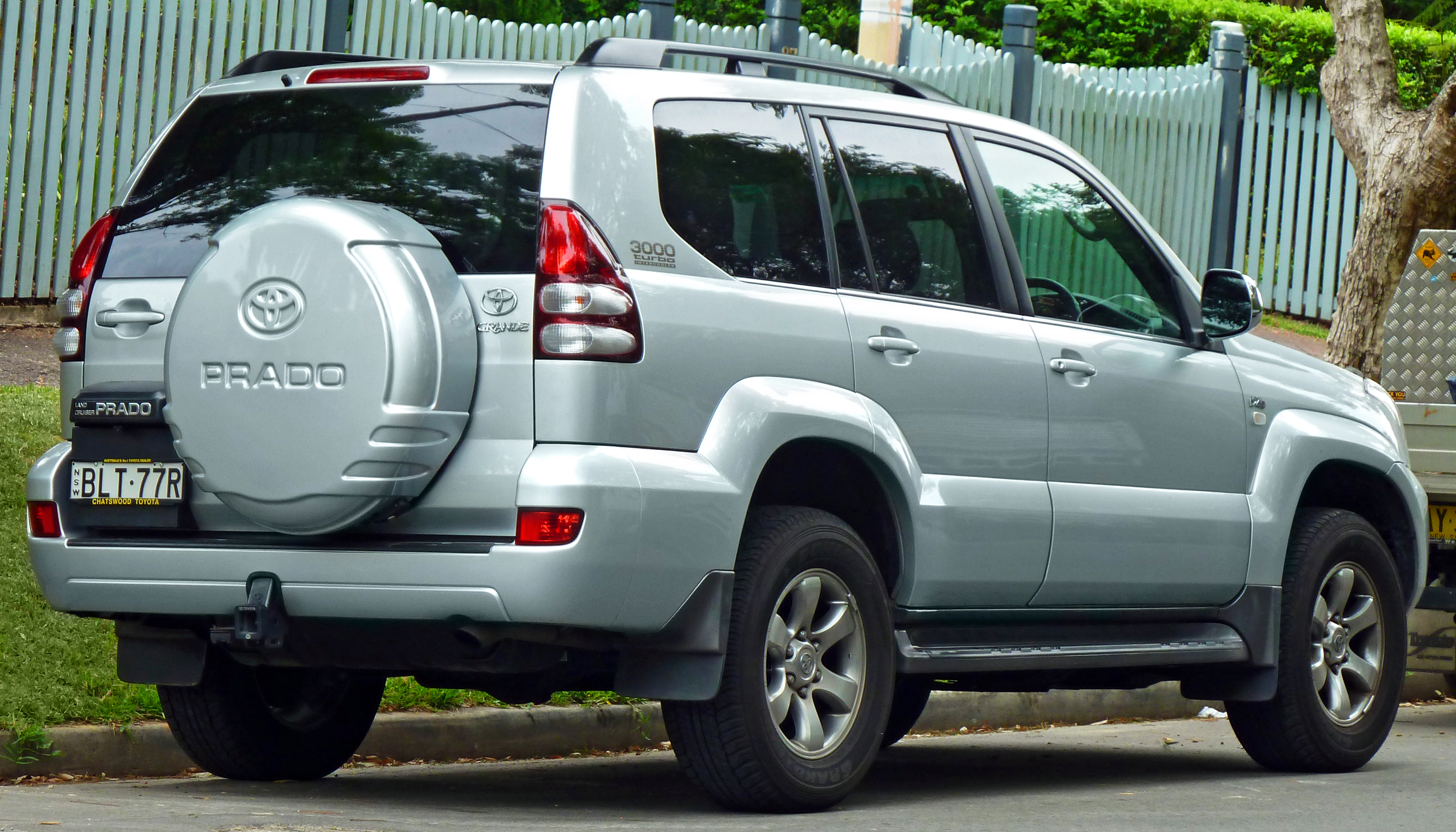
Top trim "Grande" 5-door (Australia)

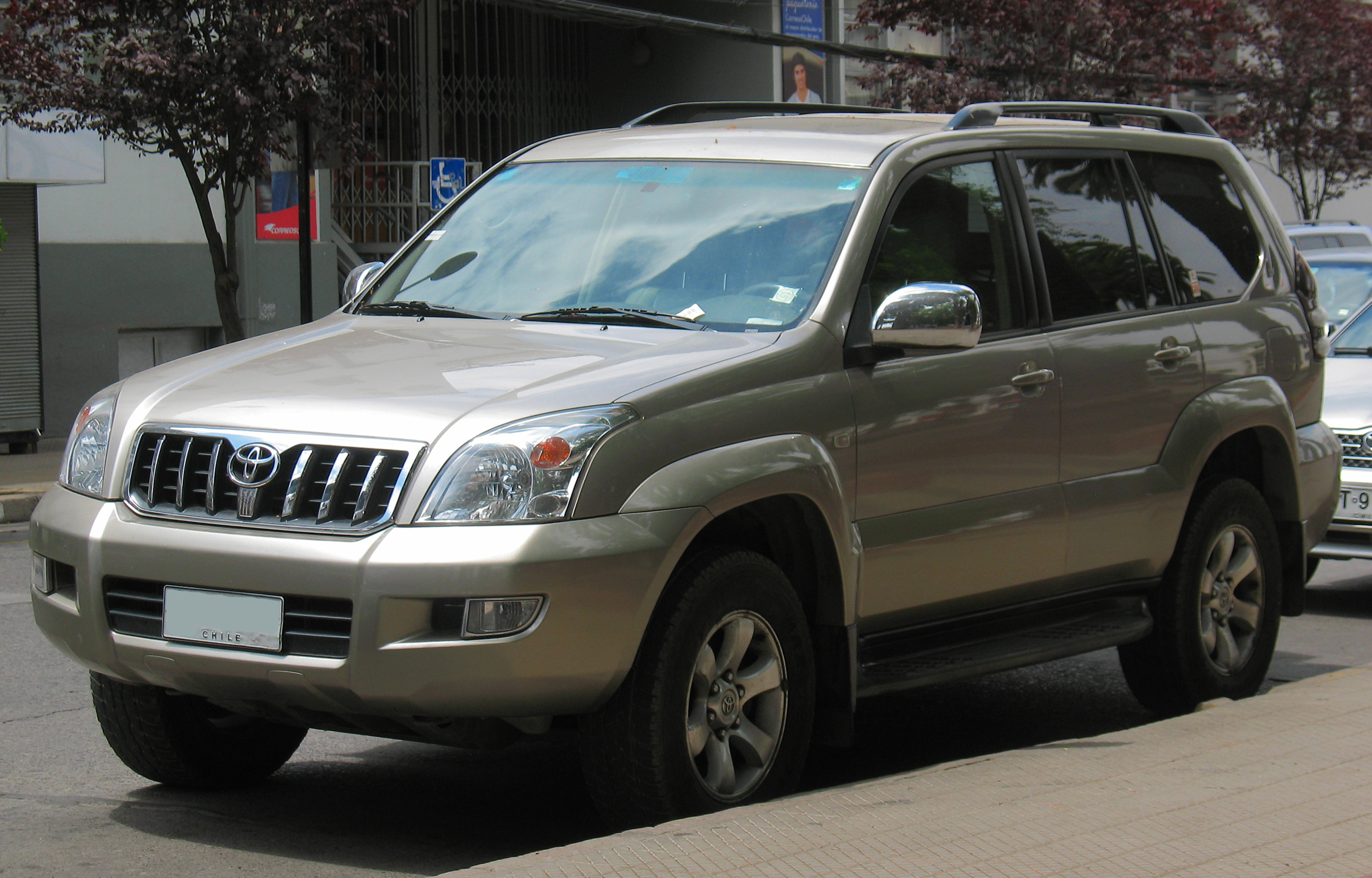
Prado (Latin America)

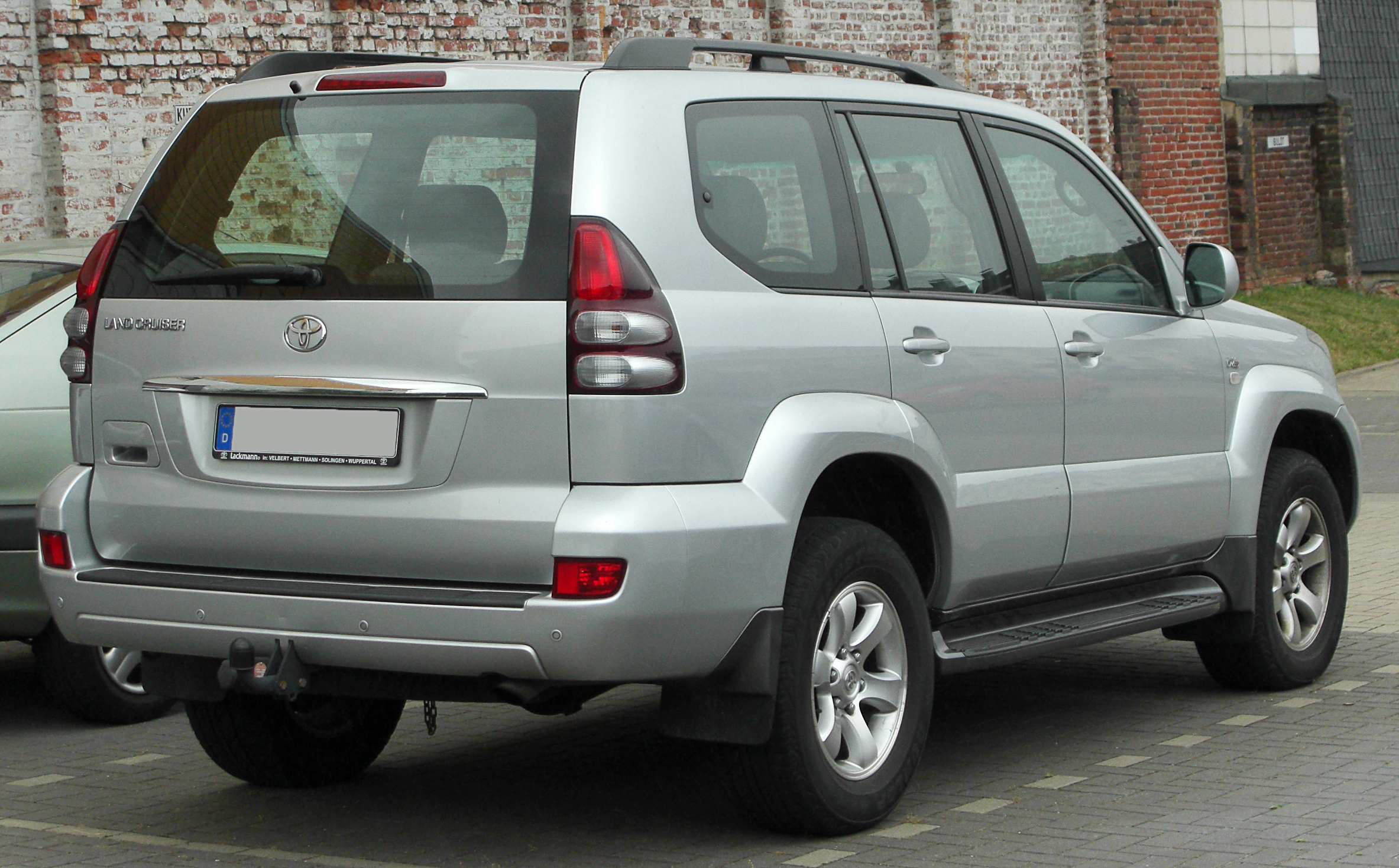
Prado (Europe)

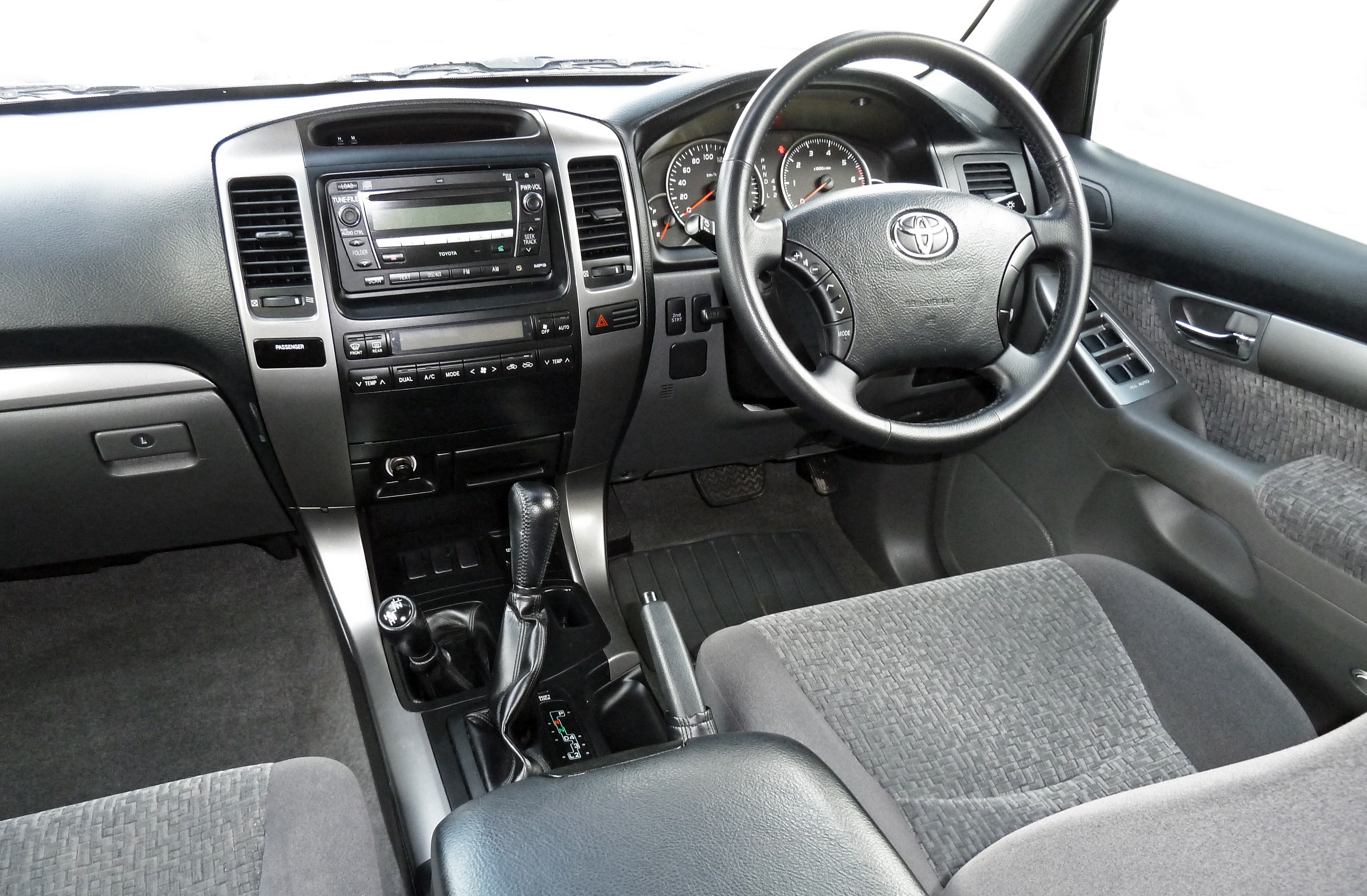
Interior

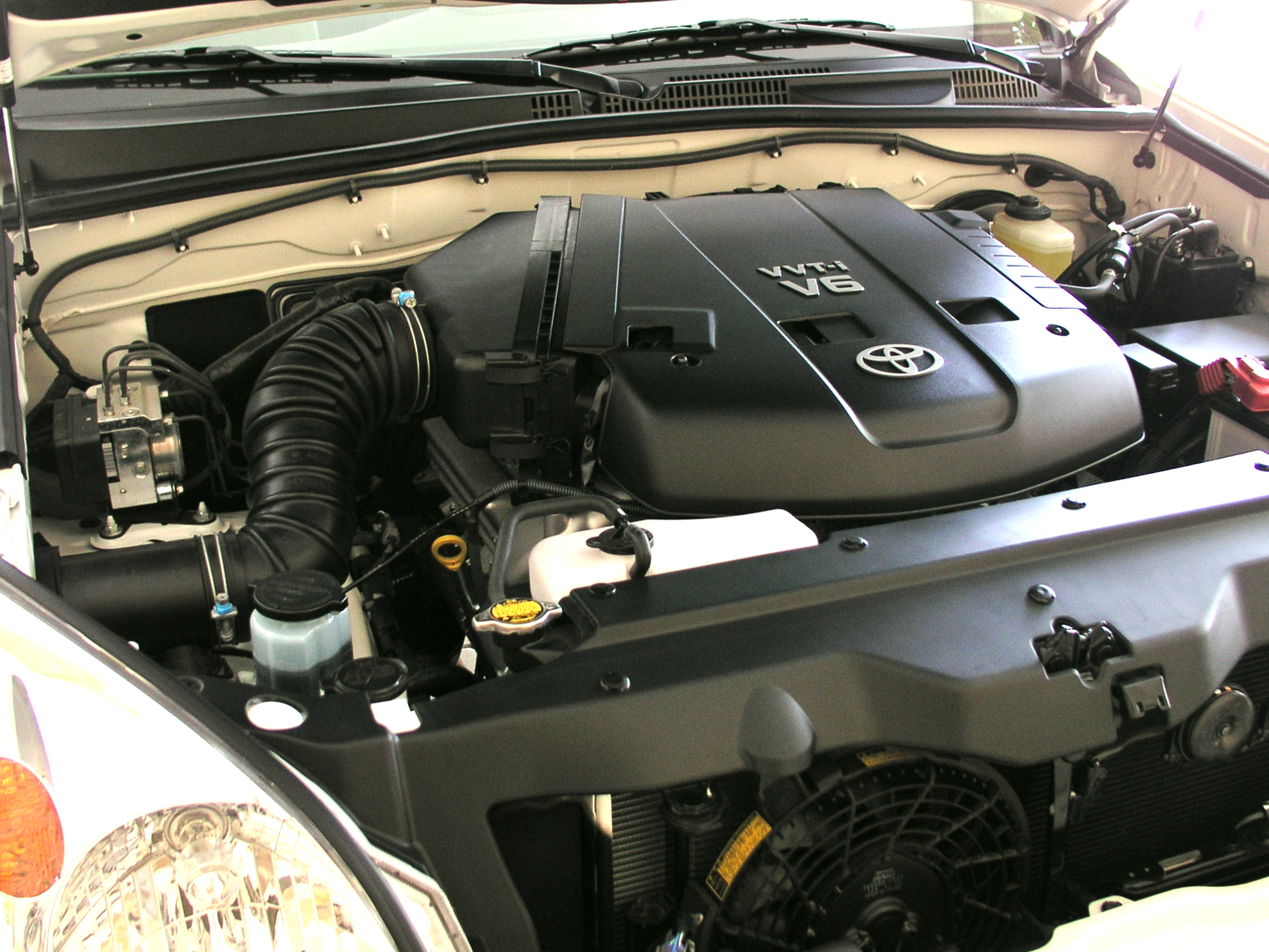
4.0 litre V6 engine in a Third Generation Toyota Prado

=== Safety ===
ANCAP test results* Toyota Prado GXL variants (2003)
Test	Score
Overall	4 /5 stars
Frontal offset	11.53/16
Side impact	16/16
Pole	0/2
Seat belt reminders	0/3
Whiplash protection	Not Assessed
Pedestrian protection	Not Assesssed
Electronic stability control	Optional

ANCAP test results* Toyota Prado VX/Grande variants (2003)
Test	Score
Overall	4 /5 stars
Frontal offset	11.53/16
Side impact	16/16
Pole	0/2
Seat belt reminders	0/3
Whiplash protection	Not Assessed
Pedestrian protection	Not Assesssed
Electronic stability control	Optional

== Fourth generation (J150; 2009) ==
Fourth generation
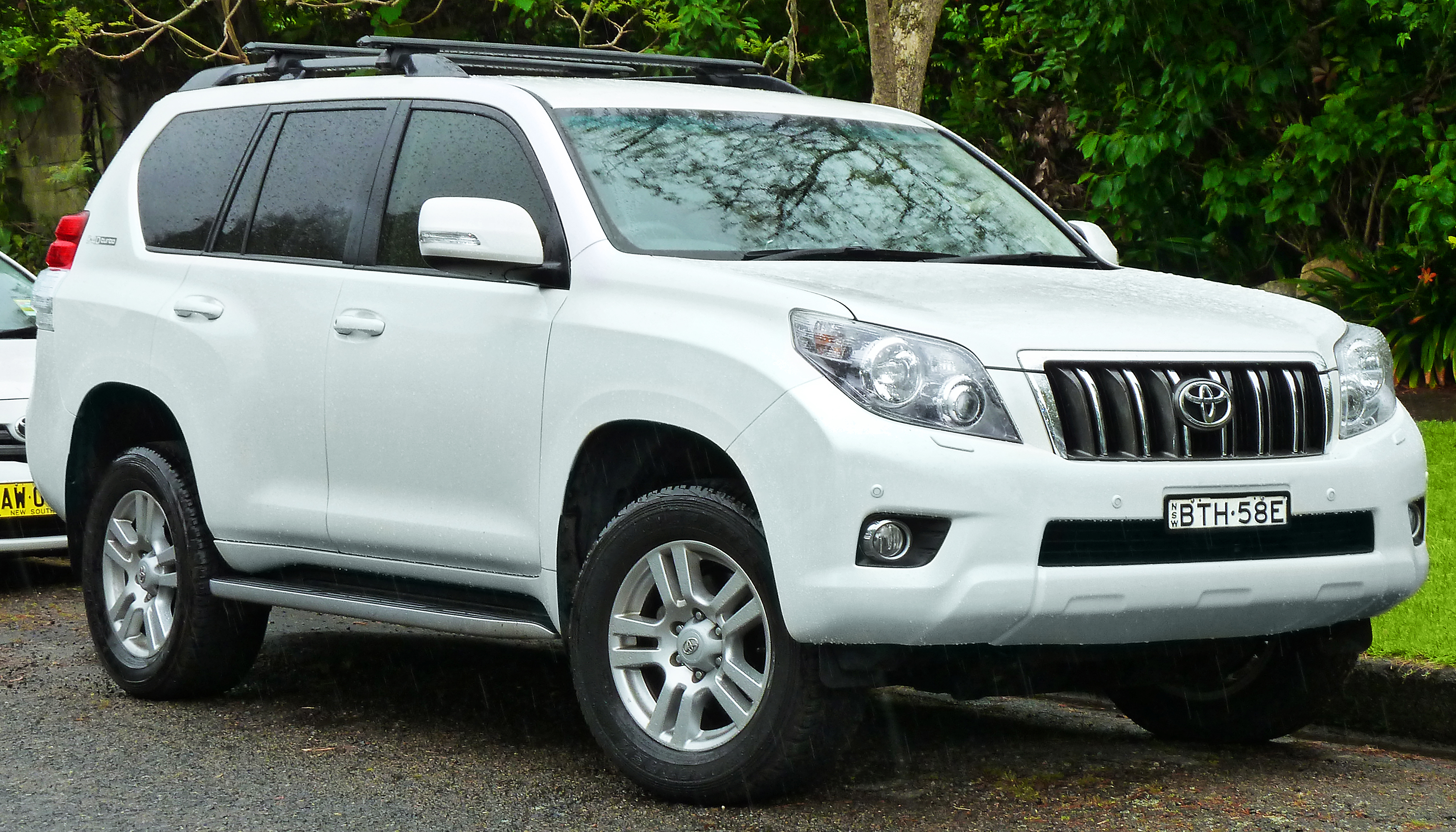
- 2009 Prado VX 5-door (KDJ150R; pre-facelift, Australia)

Overview
- Model code: J150
- Also called: Lexus GX 400/460
- Production: October 2009 – October 2023
- Assembly: Japan: Tahara, Aichi; Hamura, Tokyo (Hino); China: Chengdu (SFTM: 2013–2020); Russia: Vladivostok (2013–2015)
- Designer: Takanori Ito and Kenji Kido; Tomoaki Masuda (facelift: 2011)

Body and chassis
- Platform: Toyota F2
- Related: Toyota 4Runner (N280); Toyota FJ Cruiser

Powertrain
- Engine: Petrol: 2.7 L 2TR-FE I4; 3.5 L 7GR-FKS V6 (China, September 2015–2020); 4.0 L 1GR-FE V6; Diesel: 2.8 L 1GD-FTV I4-T (June 2015–October 2023); 3.0 L 5L-E I4; 3.0 L 1KD-FTV I4-T
- Transmission: 4/5/6-speed automatic; 5/6-speed manual

Dimensions
- Wheelbase: 2,450 mm (96.5 in) (3-door); 2,790 mm (109.8 in) (5-door)
- Length: 4,485 mm (176.6 in) (3-door); 4,825 mm (190.0 in) (5-door, interior spare wheel); 4,930 mm (194.1 in) (5-door, exterior spare wheel); 4,995 mm (196.7 in) (5-door, exterior spare wheel, facelift)
- Width: 1,885 mm (74.2 in)
- Height: 1,845–1,890 mm (72.6–74.4 in)
- Curb weight: 2,230–2,455 kg (4,916–5,412 lb)

The fourth generation has been available in some markets since October 2009. There are two base variants, five-door and three-door. The five-door variant in the general market is offered in TXL & VXL grades – which are much more option-packed. This generation of Prado features advanced 4WD and an array of electronic gadgets. This generation of the Prado is offered in the US badged as the 2010 model year Lexus GX 460 with luxury trim.

Depending on the market, the fourth generation is available with an under-floor mounted or rear door mounted spare wheel. For example, UK vehicles have the spare wheel mounted under the floor, while in Argentina the spare wheel is mounted on the rear door, leaving space for an auxiliary fuel tank, which is desirable in countries where long journeys in isolated areas may be required. Australia offered both options. The fuel capacity of the dual tank series four is 150 L (33.0 imp gal; 39.6 US gal) (87 L [19.1 imp gal; 23.0 US gal] in the main tank, 63 L [13.9 imp gal; 16.6 US gal] in the auxiliary tank) compared to 179 L (39.4 imp gal; 47.3 US gal) of the series three.

The removable third-row three-seaters of the J120 were replaced by fold-into-floor seats which seat only two people – which is also responsible for a loss of cargo capacity, the reduction in dual fuel capacity and usable height in the cargo compartment.

In some markets a 3-door, short wheelbase variant referred to as the J155 was also offered. This could be equipped with most of the same features the 5-door came with.

On the higher end Kakadu and three-door ZR models, there are six camera positions enabling viewing to the front and down, to the side both front and rear, and to the rear. The engine remained the same, although the automatic gear change points were altered for maximum fuel economy rather than maximum performance, even in Sports mode.

In June 2015, Toyota improved the petrol engine with dual VVT-i, increasing the power output by 5 kW (7 PS; 7 hp) to 207 kW (281 PS; 278 hp) and the torque to 381 N⋅m (281 lb⋅ft). The diesel engine was replaced with the smaller 1GD-FTV. Both engines were upgraded to the 6-speed Aisin AC60F automatic transmission.

The second facelift was launched in Japan, Europe, Turkey and Australasia on 12 September 2017.

=== Japan ===
In Japan, the 1GR-FE engine and TZ trim was available from September 2009 until June 2015. The 3-door Prado for the Japanese market was discontinued.

The first facelift was launched in Japan on 10 September 2013. LED headlights are available in TZ and TZ-G grades, and a 5-seater has been added to the TZ L Package grade.

From June 2015 onward, The V6 4.0-litre 1GR-FE engine, was discontinued in Japan, and diesel engines are back on offer in Japan since the previous generation, the J120. The following engines and trim levels available are:

Engine	Trim
2.7 L 2TR-FE 120 kW (163 PS; 161 hp), 246 N⋅m (181 lb⋅ft)	TX L Package
2.7 L 2TR-FE 120 kW (163 PS; 161 hp), 246 N⋅m (181 lb⋅ft)	TX
2.7 L 2TR-FE 120 kW (163 PS; 161 hp), 246 N⋅m (181 lb⋅ft)	TX 5 seat
2.8 L 1GD-FTV 130 kW (177 PS; 174 hp), 450 N⋅m (332 lbf⋅ft)	TZ-G
2.8 L 1GD-FTV 130 kW (177 PS; 174 hp), 450 N⋅m (332 lbf⋅ft)	TX L Package
2.8 L 1GD-FTV (2020-) 150 kW (204 PS; 201 hp), 500 N⋅m (369 lbf⋅ft)	TZ-G
2.8 L 1GD-FTV (2020-) 150 kW (204 PS; 201 hp), 500 N⋅m (369 lbf⋅ft)	TX L Package

A minor refresh was announced in September 2017. LED headlights and Toyota Safety Sense now is standard for all models. The 7 seats variant for TX grade and 5 seats variant for TX L Package was added.

The monthly sales target for Japan is 1,000 units.

=== Australia ===
The fourth generation Prado was released in Australia on 16 November 2009. Five-door models include the GX, GXL, VX and the high-end Kakadu. The Altitude model, introduced in 2012, is priced between the GXL and VX. The Prado Altitude has satellite navigation, two-way moon roof, leather accented trim and 7" Fujitsu-Ten touch-screen/multimedia centre. Three-door shorter wheelbase models include the SX and ZR.

A facelift went on sale in October 2013, with more standard equipment, new front panels and new headlights. Higher specification models received LED headlights and suspension improvements. The three door Prado was dropped at this time due to poor sales.

Unlike in Japan, Toyota Australia retained the 4.0L V6 engine until 2017 when the second facelift was launched. All GXL models received a seven-inch sat-nav as standard.

In August 2014, a new tailgate without the spare tyre became available as an option for the first time in Australia.

In June 2015, the venerable KD 3.0-litre turbo-diesel 4 cylinder which had been available in various markets from 2000, was replaced by the 2.8-litre GD turbo-diesel 4 cylinder. This engine provided better emission standards while increasing power and torque to 130 kW (174 hp) and 450 N⋅m (332 lbf⋅ft) respectively.

Since the August 2020 update, all Prado models are offered with an automatic transmission only. They are also only available with the GD 2.8-litre turbo diesel 4 cylinder engine, albeit with increased power (150 kW, 201 hp) and torque (500 N⋅m, 369 lbf⋅ft). Models are now also available with a 9-inch infotainment screen incorporating Apple CarPlay and Android Auto.

=== Europe ===
In the United Kingdom, the J150 Prado is designated as the Land Cruiser LC3, LC4 and LC5, depending on the equipment levels. In some markets, commercial van variants, based on the short-wheelbase chassis are available.

=== China ===
The 4.0-litre 1GR-FE V6 was standard paired to a five-speed automatic gearbox. On 24 September 2015, the fourth generation mid-life facelift received a new 3.5-litre V6, the 7GR-FKS to replace the previous 4.0-litre V6. While the engine capacity is lower when compared to the 4.0-litre, the power output remains the same at 206 kW (280 PS; 276 hp) and 365 N⋅m (269 lb⋅ft) of torque. It uses less fuel and it is the only country in the world to offer the Prado with 3.5-litre V6 (model GRJ152L) to the consumer alongside the 2.7-litre inline-four petrol (model TRJ152L). Meanwhile, the 2.7-litre engine version (model TRJ152L), introduced in October 2013, got a revised 2TR-FE engine with dual VVT-i, and the four-speed automatic was replaced with the previous six-speed Aisin AC60F; the 3.5-litre V6 version also got the new transmission. The Prado was discontinued in June 2020 due to it has not suited China's regulations on fuel consumption and emission.

=== Gallery ===
==== Pre-facelift ====
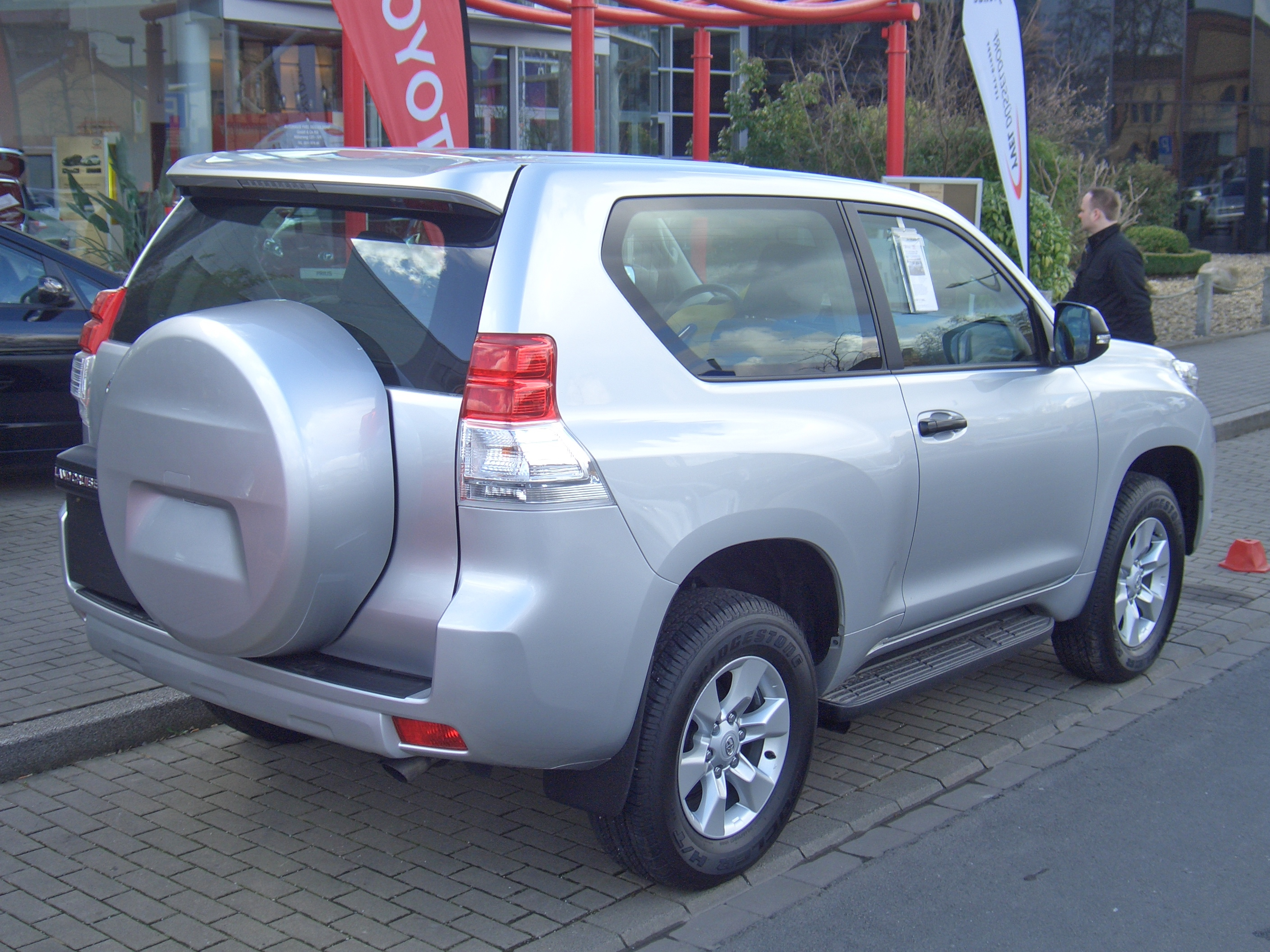
2009 Land Cruiser 3-door (KDJ155, Germany)

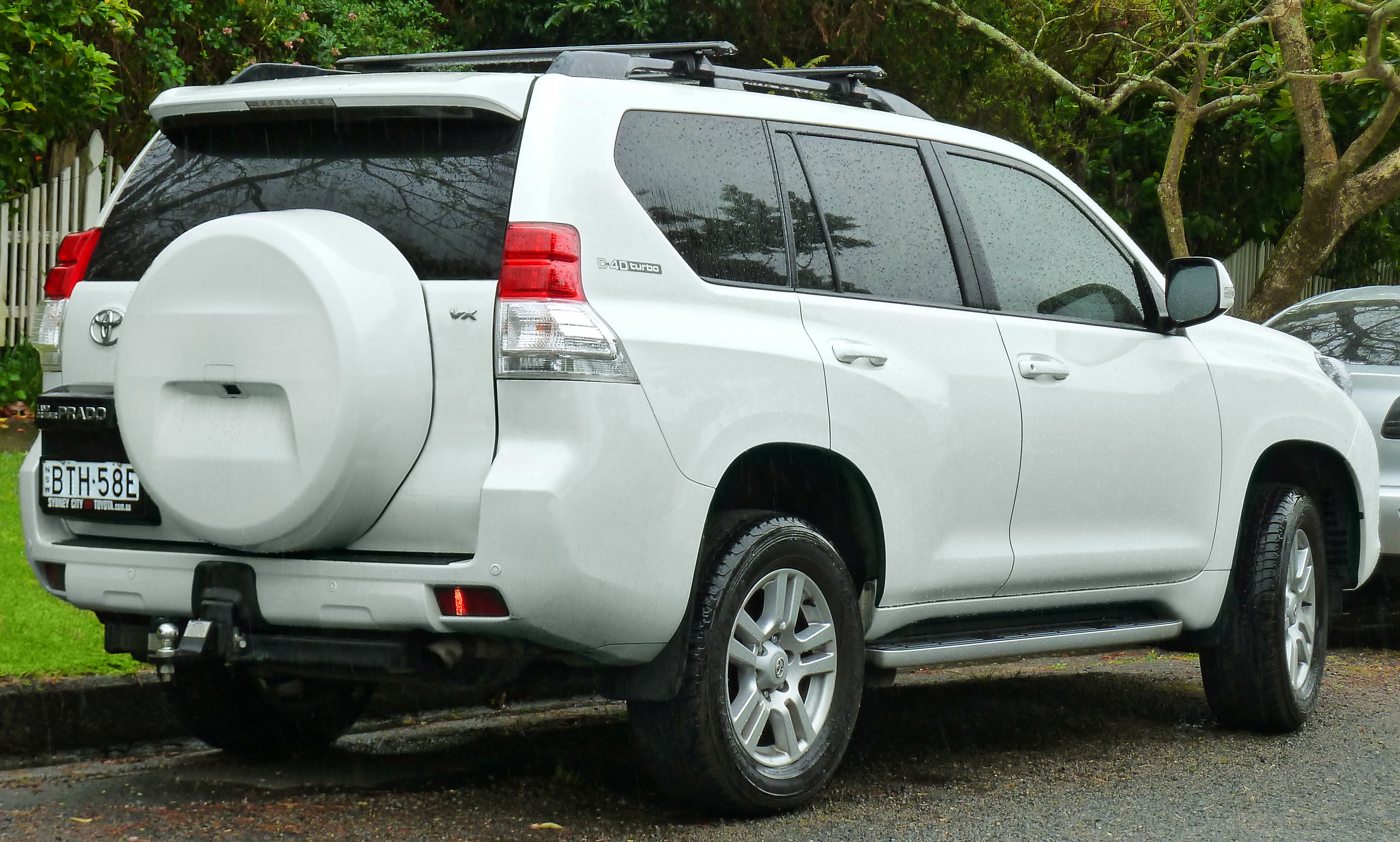
Prado VX 5-door (KDJ150, Australia)

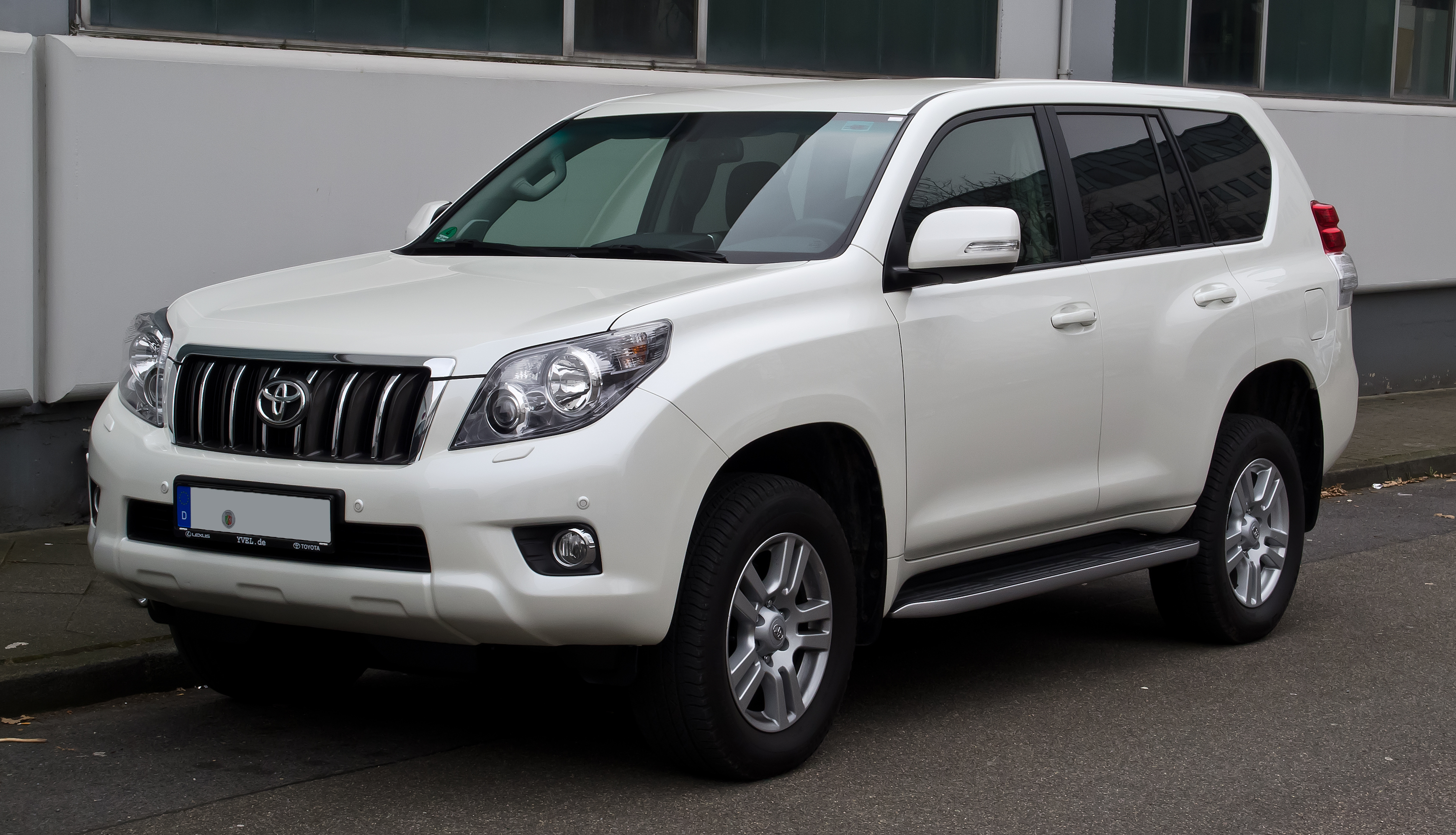
Land Cruiser Life (KDJ150, Germany)

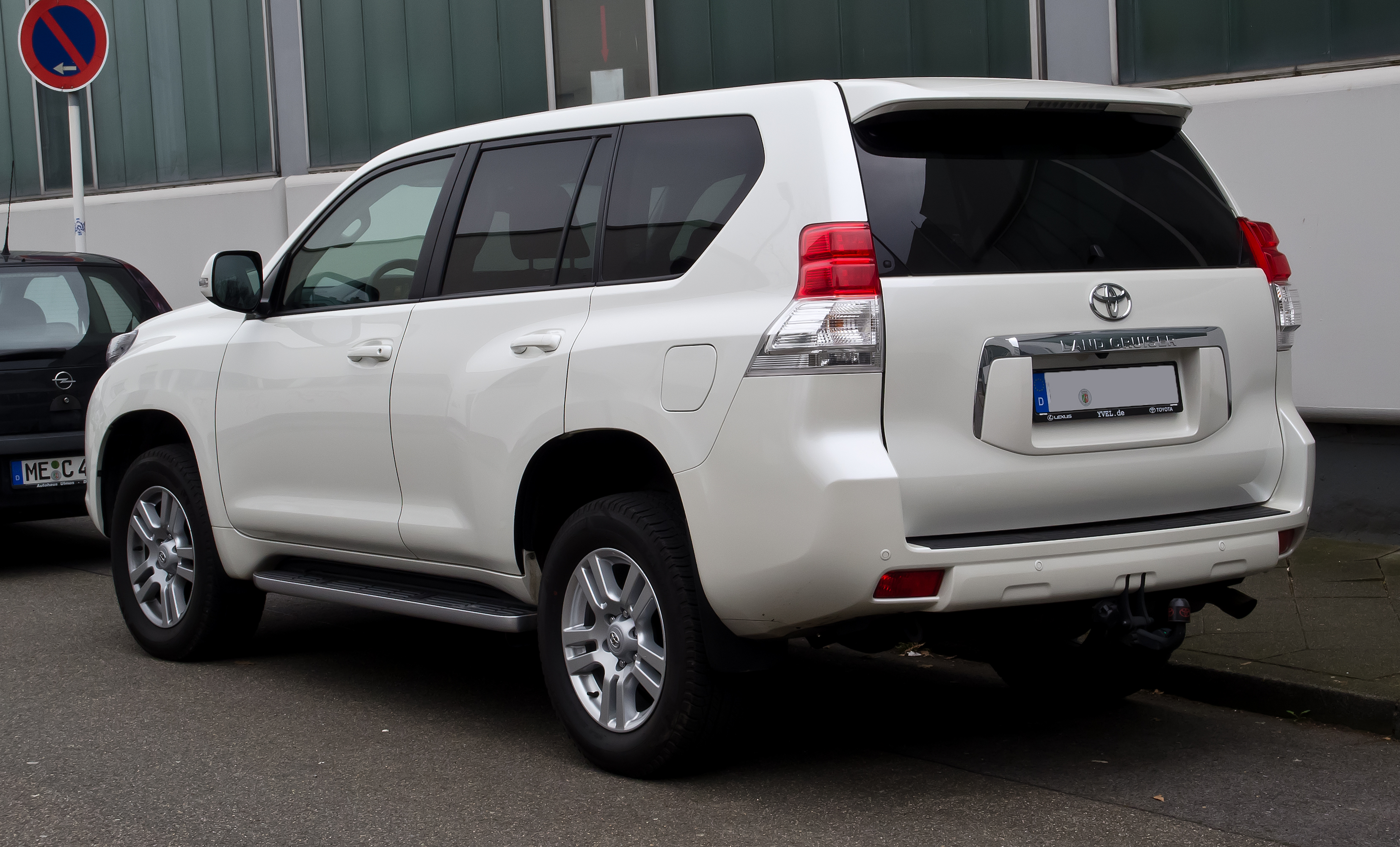
Land Cruiser Life (KDJ150, Germany)

==== First facelift ====
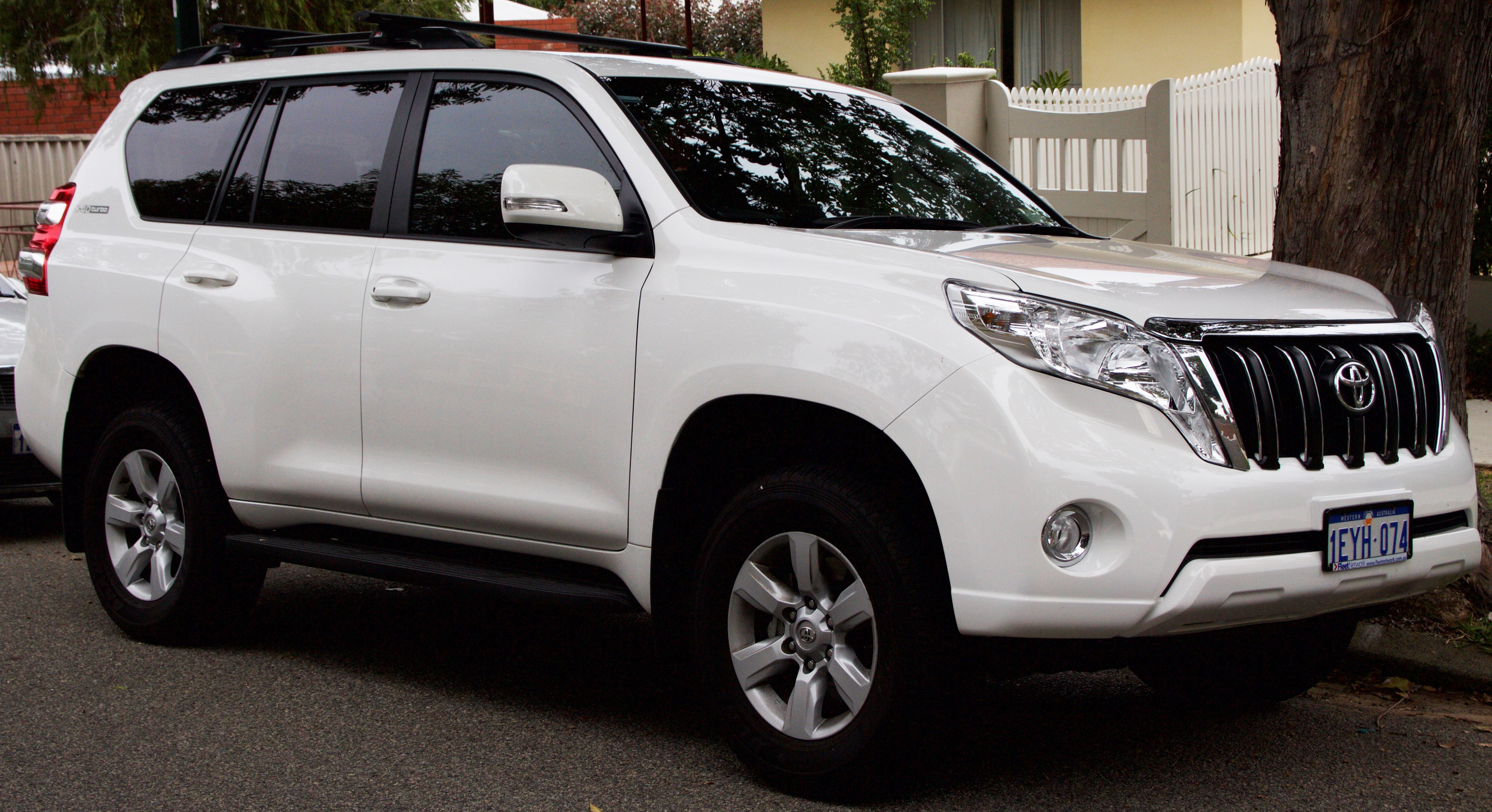
2015 Prado GXL (KDJ150, Australia)

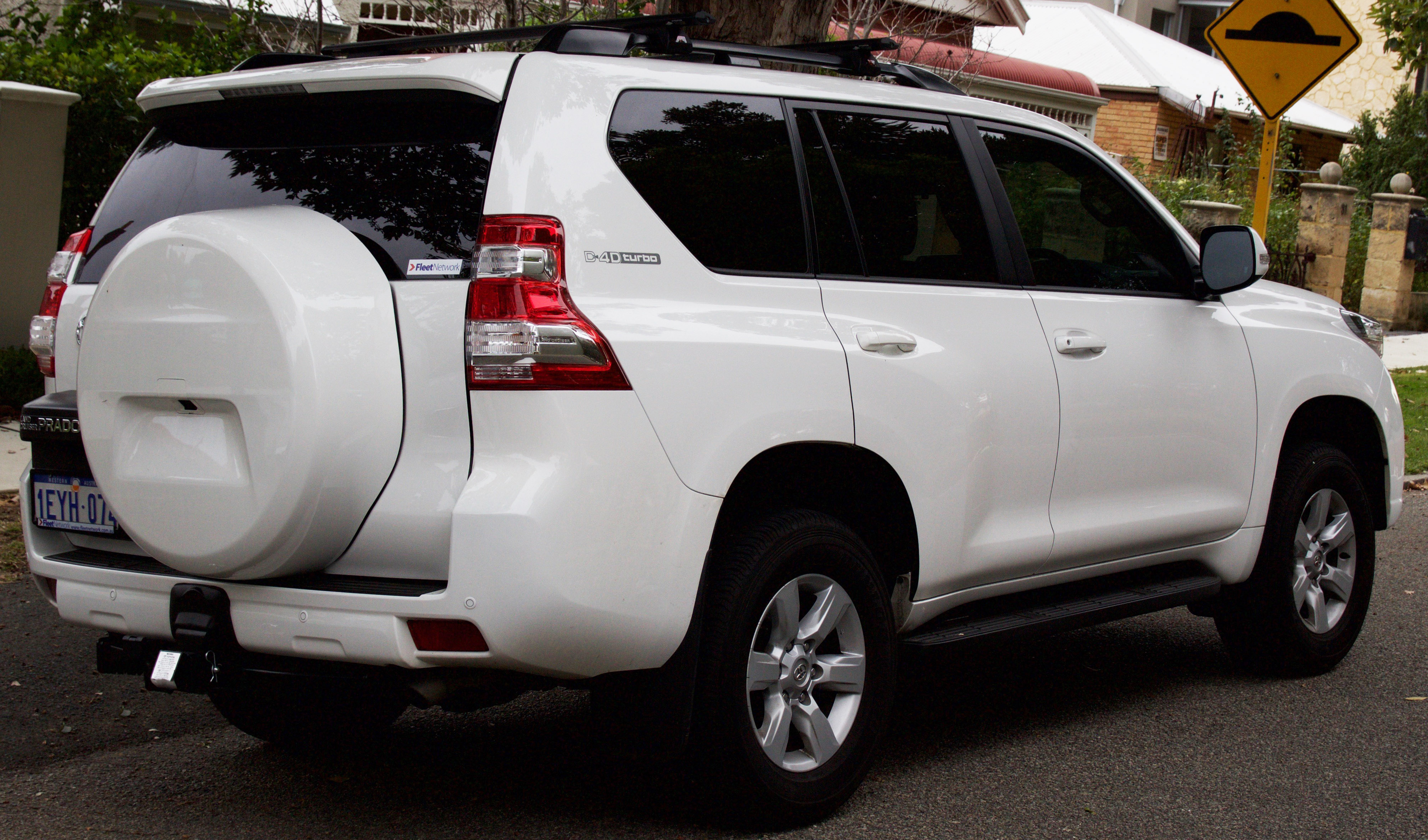
2015 Prado GXL (KDJ150, Australia)

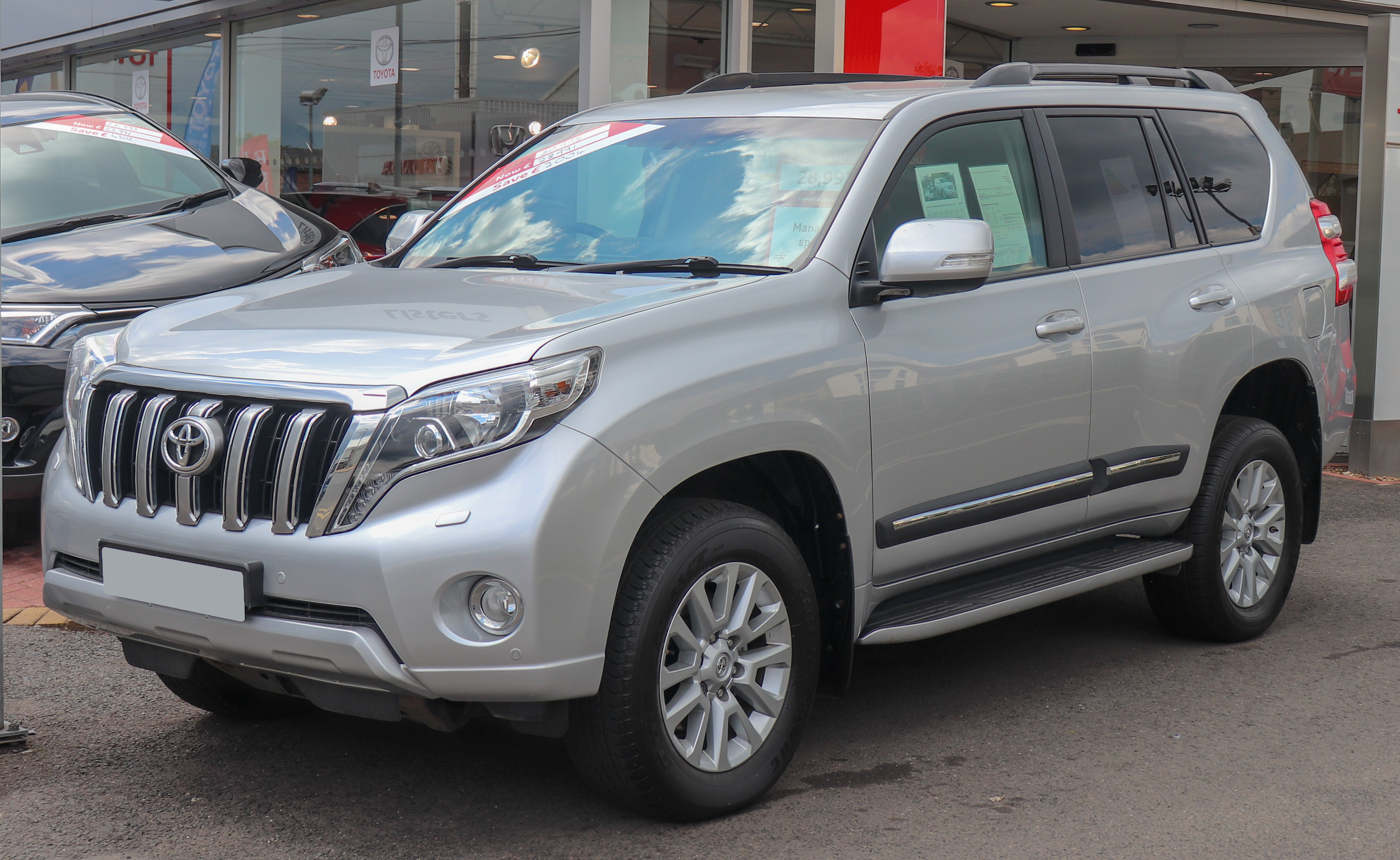
2015 Land Cruiser Icon (KDJ150, UK)

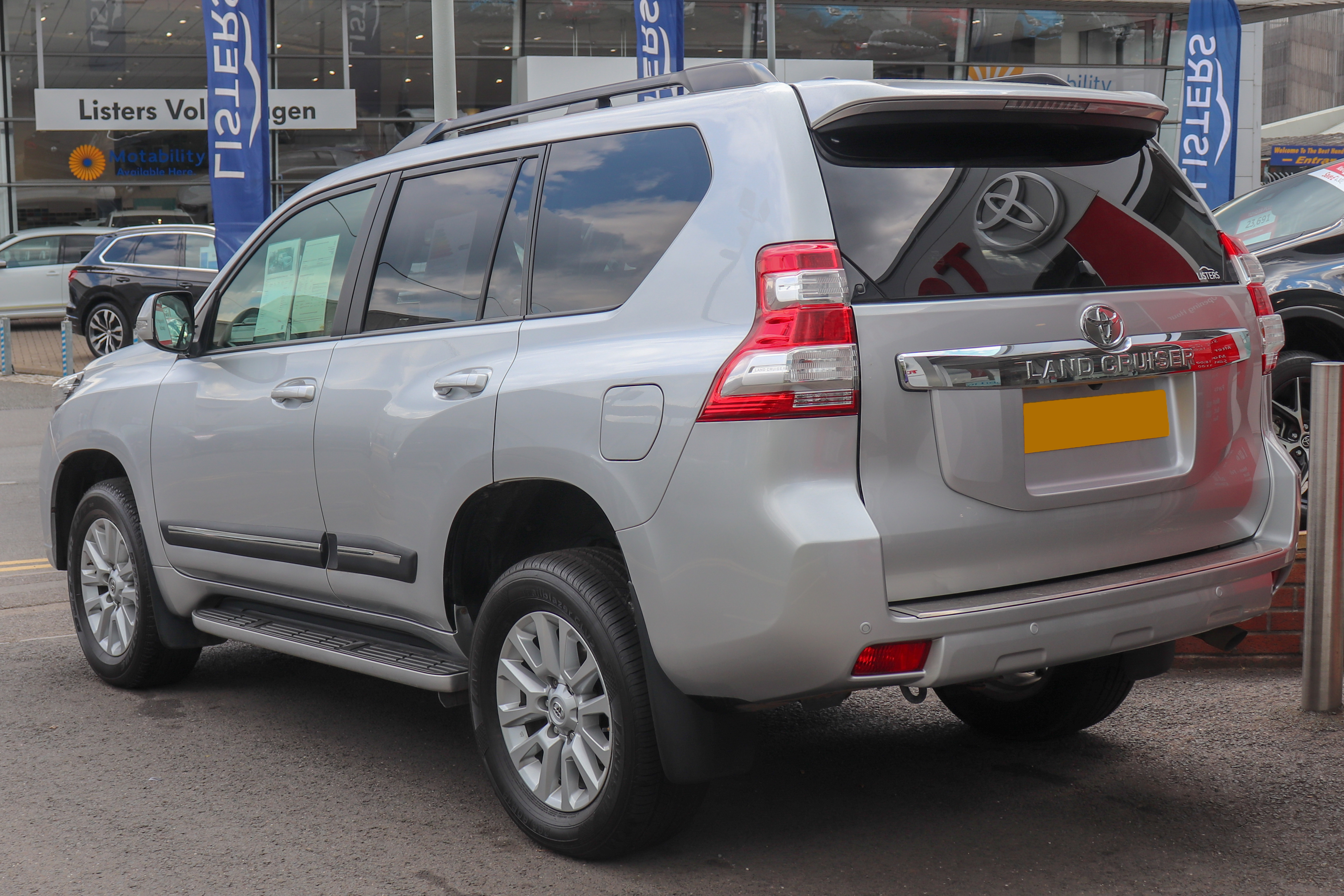
2015 Land Cruiser Icon (KDJ150, UK)

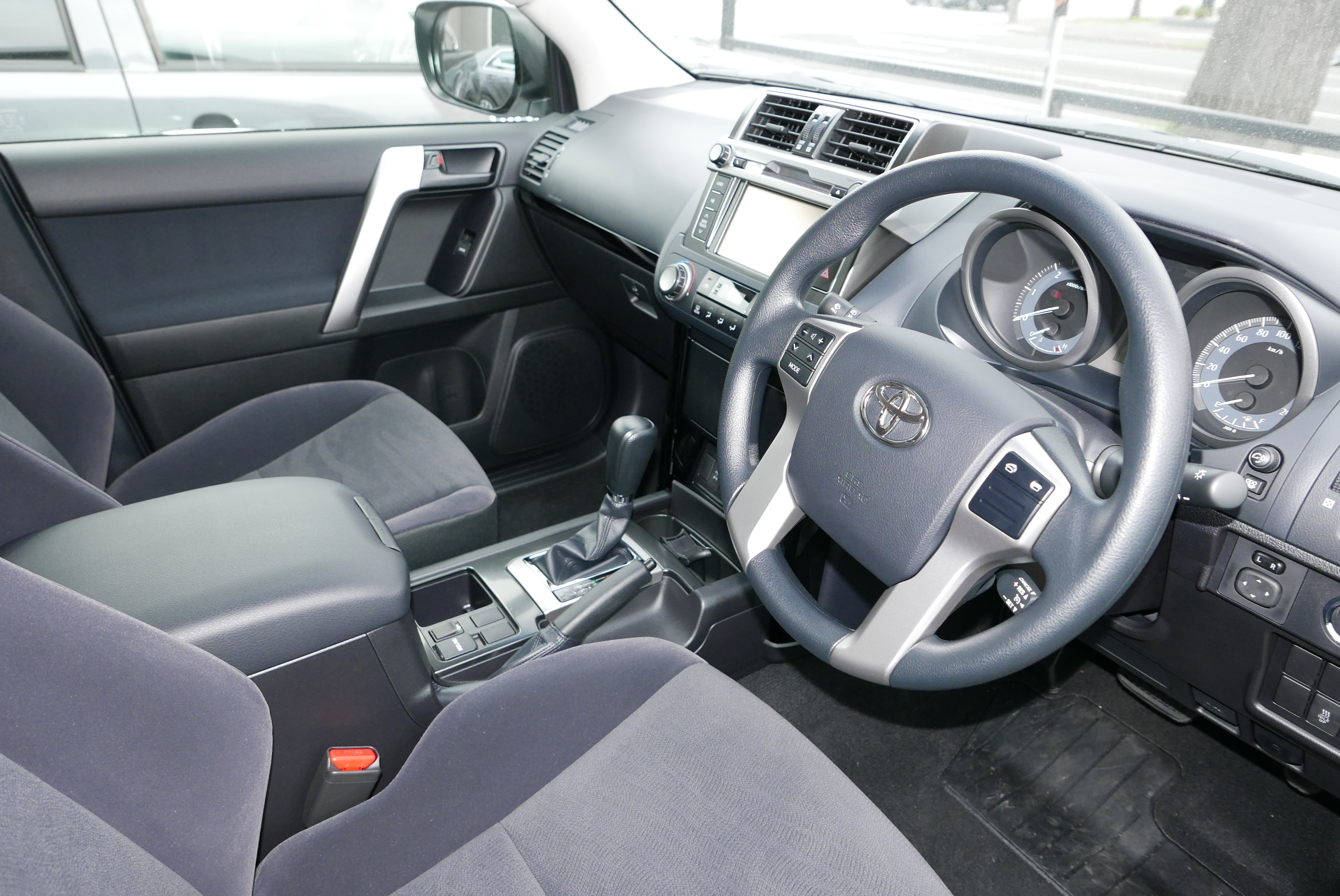
Interior

==== Second facelift ====
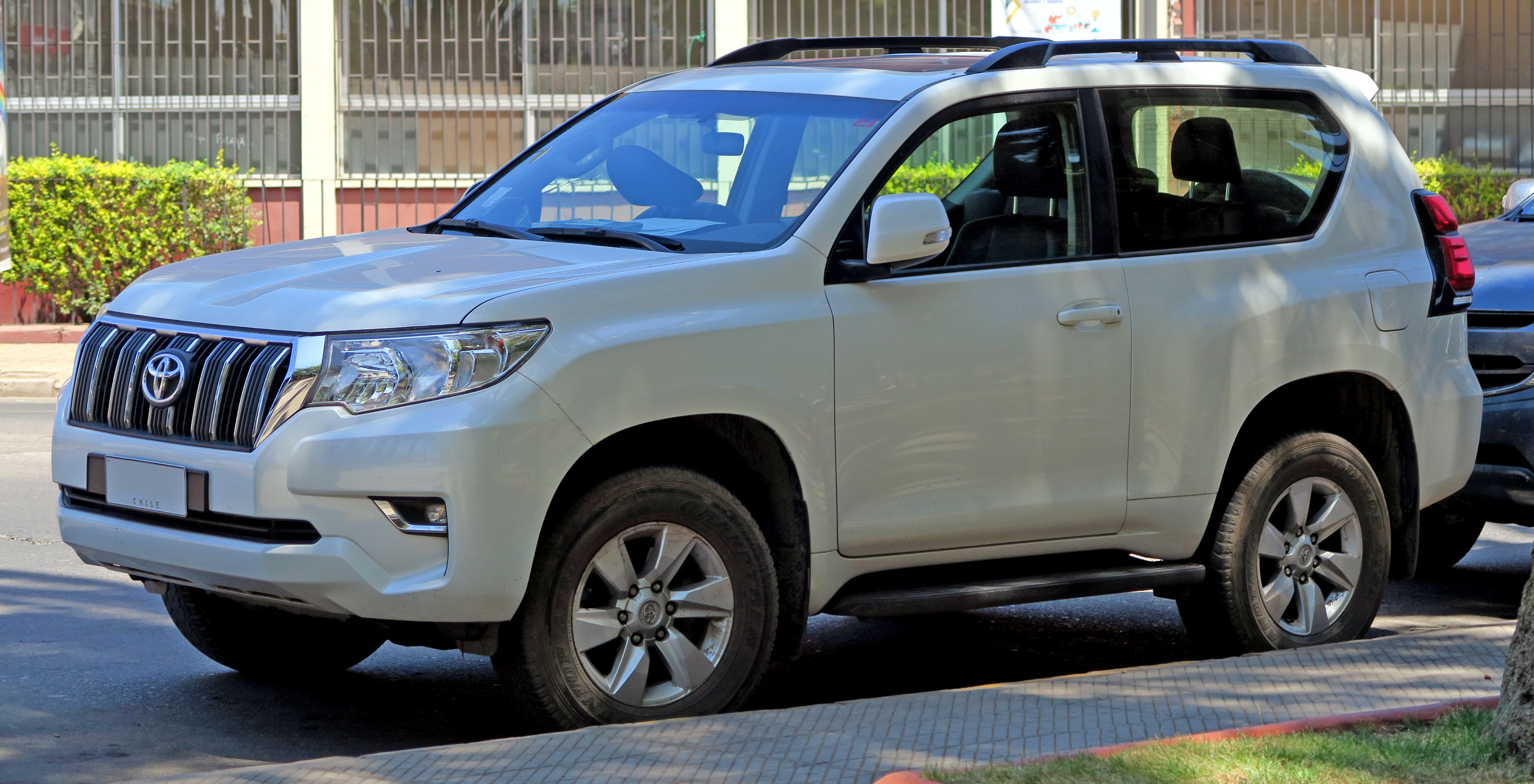
2019 Prado TXL 3-door (TRJ152, Chile)

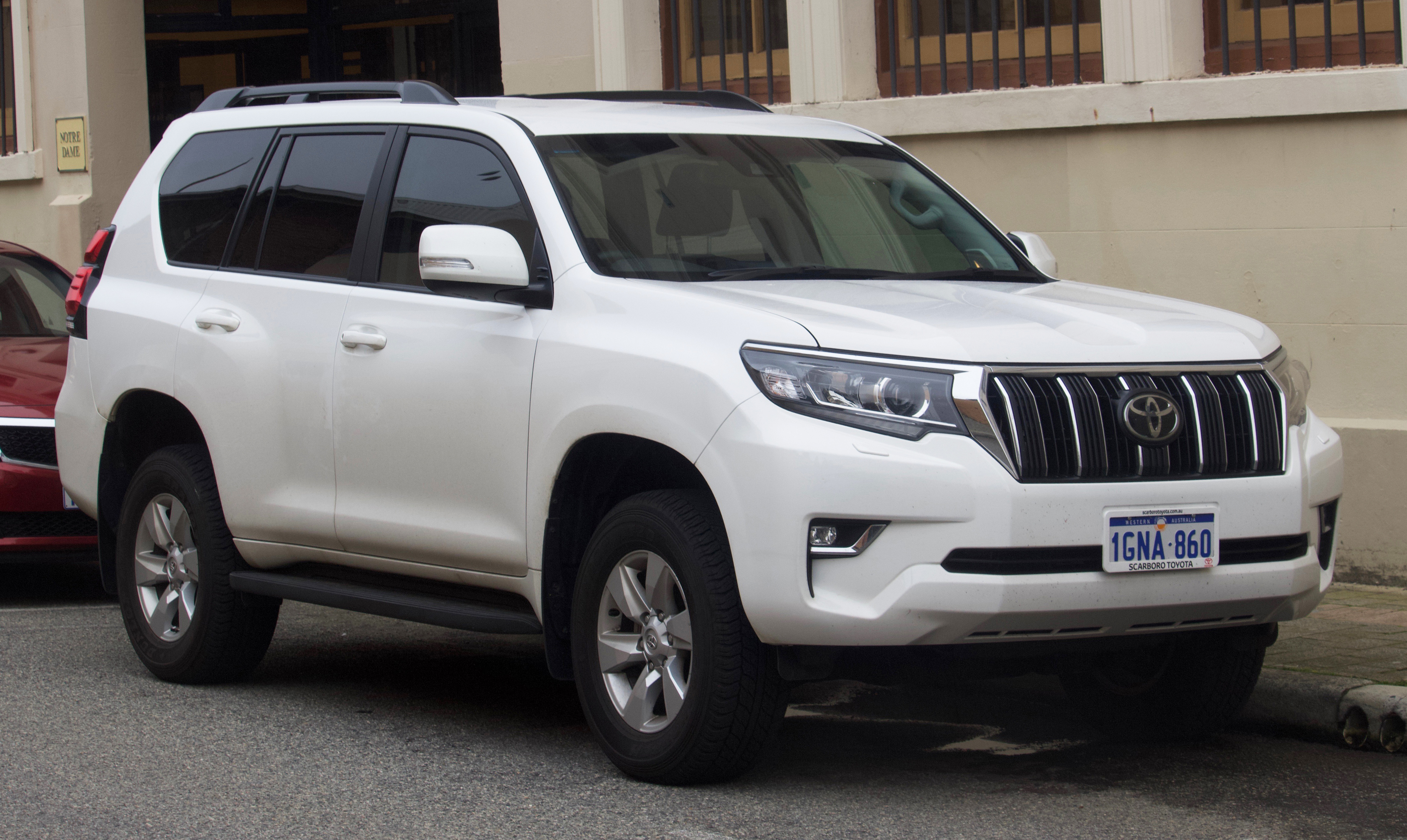
2018 Prado GXL (GDJ150, Australia)

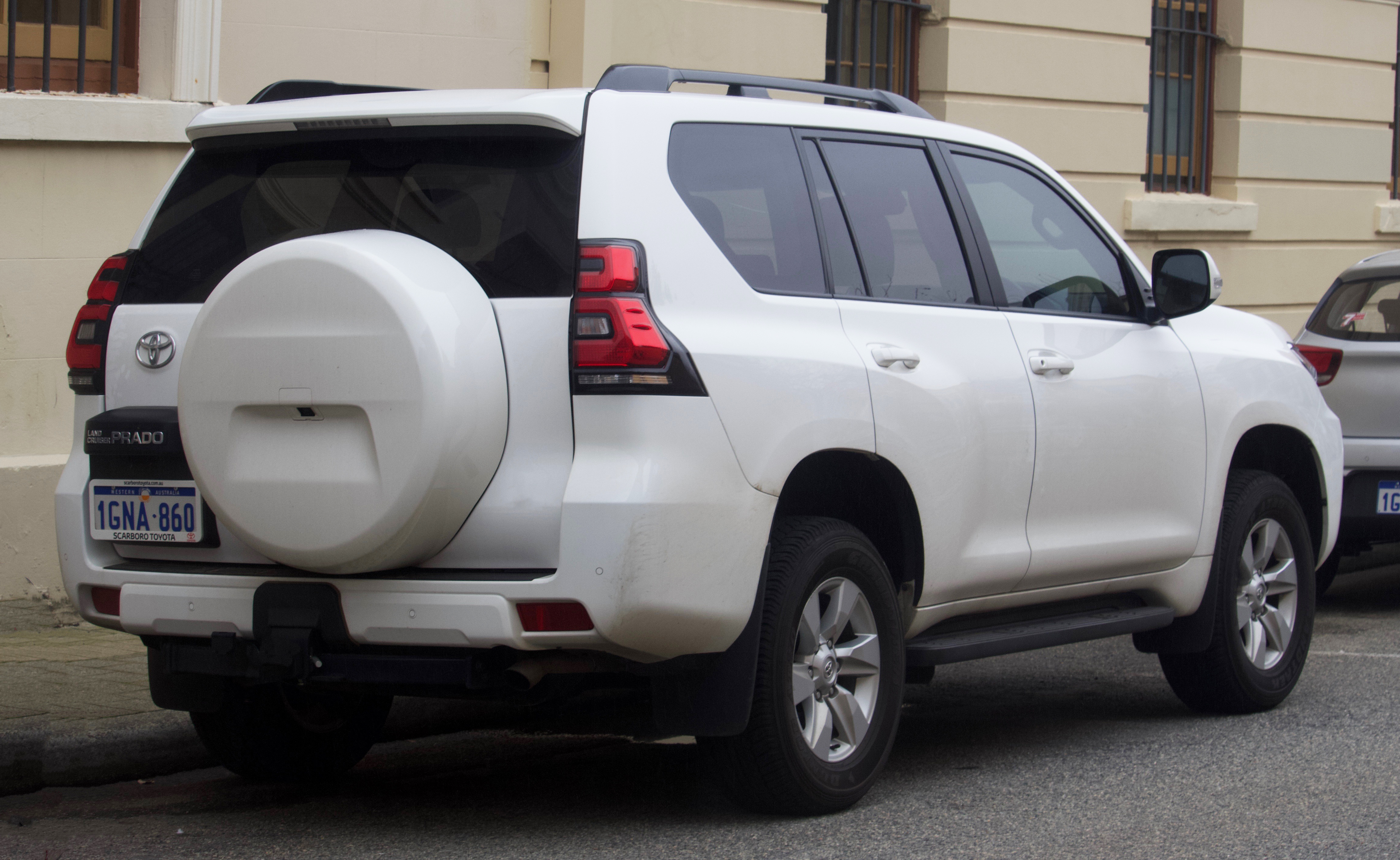
2018 Prado GXL (GDJ150, Australia)

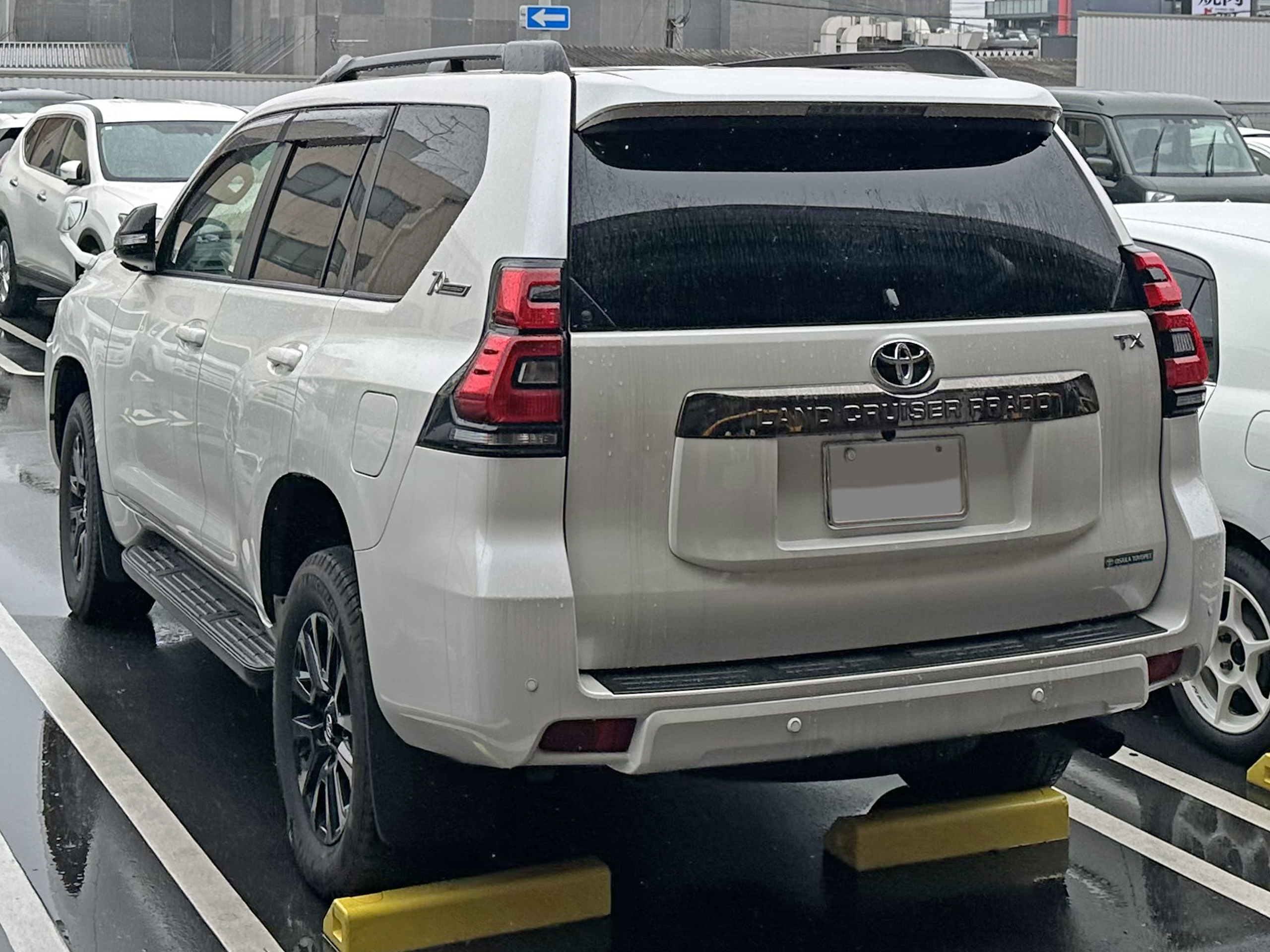
Prado TX (TRJ150, Japan)

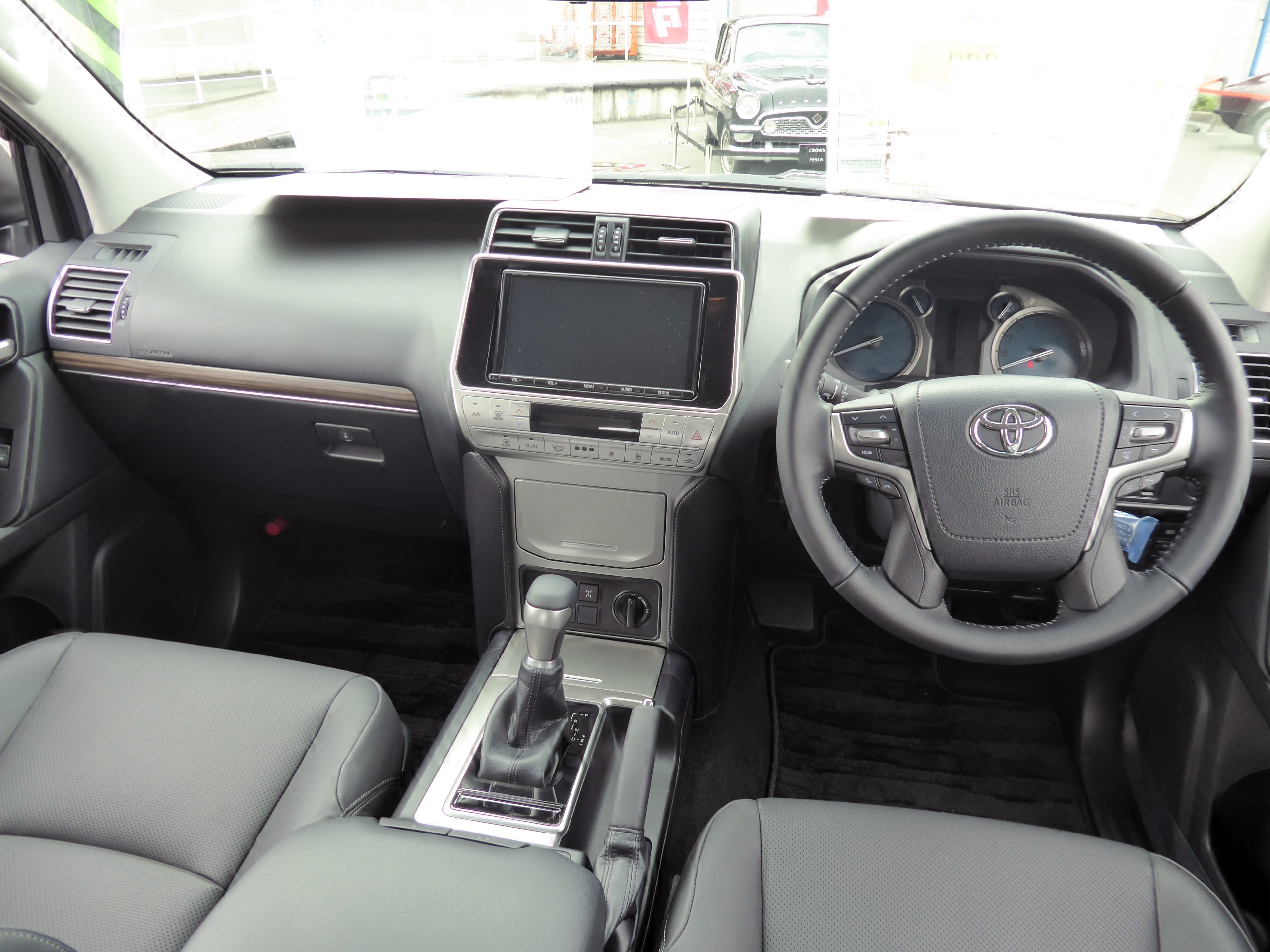
Interior

=== Safety ===
ANCAP test results* Toyota Prado (2010)
Test	Score
Overall	5 /5 stars
Frontal offset	15.11/16
Side impact	16/16
Pole	2/2
Seat belt reminders	2/3
Whiplash protection	Pending
Pedestrian protection	Marginal
Electronic stability control	Standard

ANCAP test results* Toyota Prado (2011)
Test	Score
Overall	5 /5 stars
Frontal offset	15.11/16
Side impact	16/16
Pole	2/2
Seat belt reminders	2/3
Whiplash protection	Not Assessed
Pedestrian protection	Marginal
Electronic stability control	Standard

== Fifth generation (J250; 2023) ==
Fifth generation
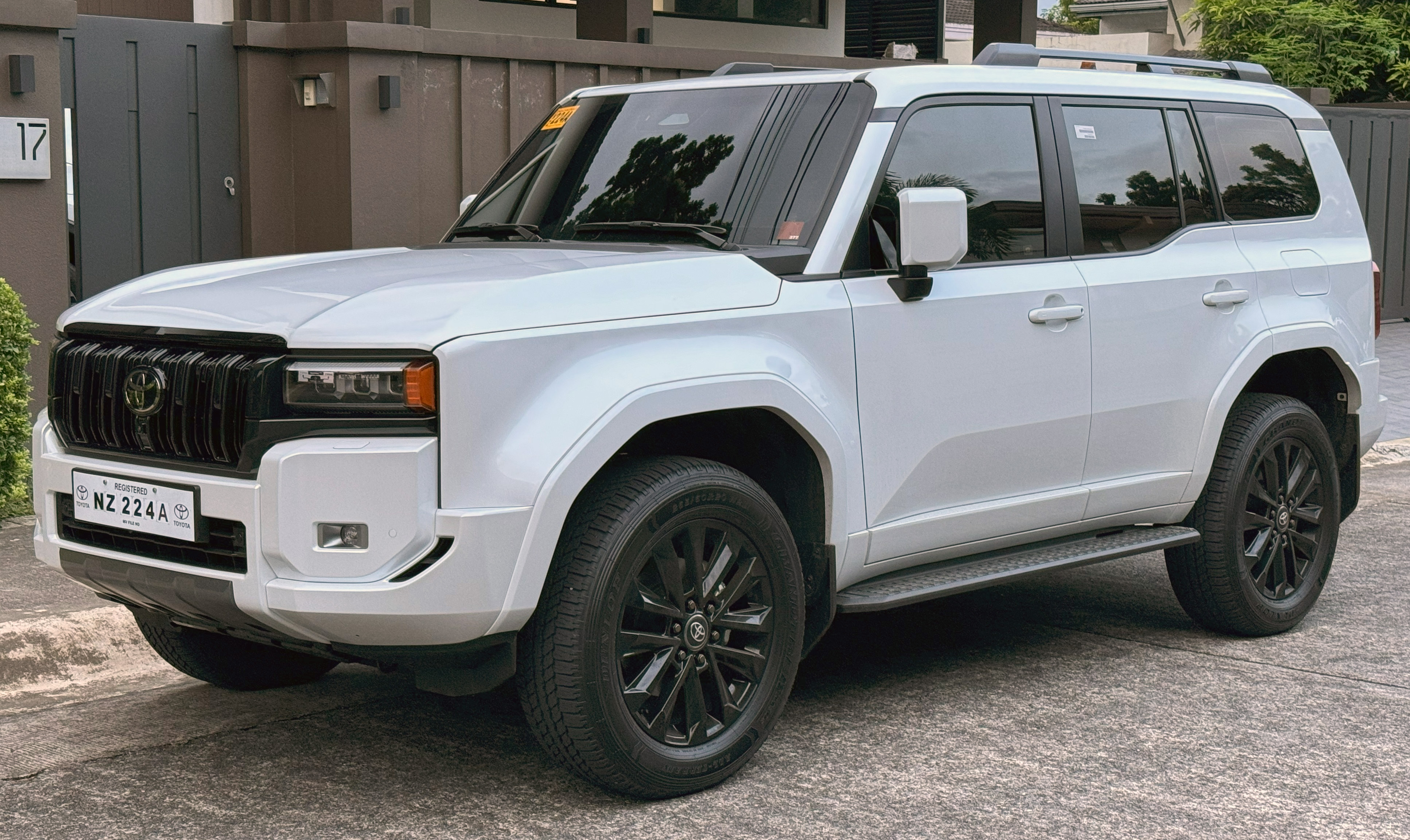
- Toyota Land Cruiser Prado (Philippines)

Overview
- Model code: J250
- Also called: Toyota Land Cruiser 250 (Japan); Toyota Land Cruiser (Europe, Israel and North America); Lexus GX (J250)
- Production: October 2023 – present
- Model years: 2024–present
- Assembly: Japan: Tahara, Aichi (Tahara plant); Hamura, Tokyo (Hino); China: Chengdu (FAW Toyota)
- Designer: Yoshito Watanabe (Project Chief Designer); Ji-won Kim, Kosuke Kubo, Tokiko Hirai (exterior); Hidemasa Komatsu, Naoki Hamajima (interior)

Body and chassis
- Platform: TNGA: GA-F
- Related: Toyota 4Runner (N500); Toyota Tacoma (N400); Toyota Land Cruiser (J300); Lexus LX (J310)

Powertrain
- Engine: Petrol: 2.4 L T24A-FTS turbo I4; 2.7 L 2TR-FE I4; Petrol hybrid: 2.4 L T24A-FTS turbo I4; Diesel: 2.8 L 1GD-FTV turbo I4; Diesel mild hybrid: 2.8 L 1GD-FTV turbo I4
- Transmission: 6-speed automatic; 8-speed automatic
- Hybrid drivetrain: Parallel (i-Force Max)
- Battery: 1.87 kWh, 6.5 Ah, 288 V NiMH (i-Force Max)
- Plug-in charging: V2L: 2.4 kW (HEV)

Dimensions
- Wheelbase: 2,850 mm (112.2 in)
- Length: 4,925–4,990 mm (193.9–196.5 in)
- Width: 1,980 mm (78.0 in)
- Height: 1,870–1,935 mm (73.6–76.2 in)
- Curb weight: 2,518–2,618 kg (5,551–5,772 lb)

Chronology
- Predecessor: Toyota Land Cruiser (J200) (North America)

The J250 series Land Cruiser Prado was revealed on 2 August 2023. It is marketed as the Land Cruiser 250 in Japan and simply the Land Cruiser in North America and some European countries. Some other markets such as Australia, China, Philippines, and other European countries retain the Land Cruiser Prado nameplate. The design and engineering direction had shifted compared to the previous generation, now focusing on "practicality, durability and dependability" with the basic approach outlined by previous Toyota CEO Akio Toyoda. It results in a retro-inspired, boxy exterior styling inspired by the J60 model from the 1980s.

The vehicle is based on the body-on-frame GA-F platform shared with the larger J300 series Land Cruiser. It is claimed to have a 50 per cent increase in frame rigidity, and a 30 per cent increase in overall rigidity. The model is also the first "Light Duty Series" Land Cruiser to use an electric power steering (EPS) system, which promises easier steering wheel handling during off-road conditions, improving maneuverability at low speed, and allows the lane tracing assist system to be implemented. The maximum approach and departure angle is 31.0 degrees and 22.0 degrees respectively, while breakover angle reaches 25 degrees. Ground clearance is rated at 221 mm (8.7 in).

All models are equipped with a full-time four-wheel drive system with Torsen limited-slip centre differential and manual locking. An electronic two-speed transfer case with high/low range is also standard. Normal power distribution in straightline driving is 40/60 front-to-rear. An electronic locking rear differential is standard, which is able to split power 50/50 to the rear wheels for improved traction control on rough terrain.

=== Gallery ===
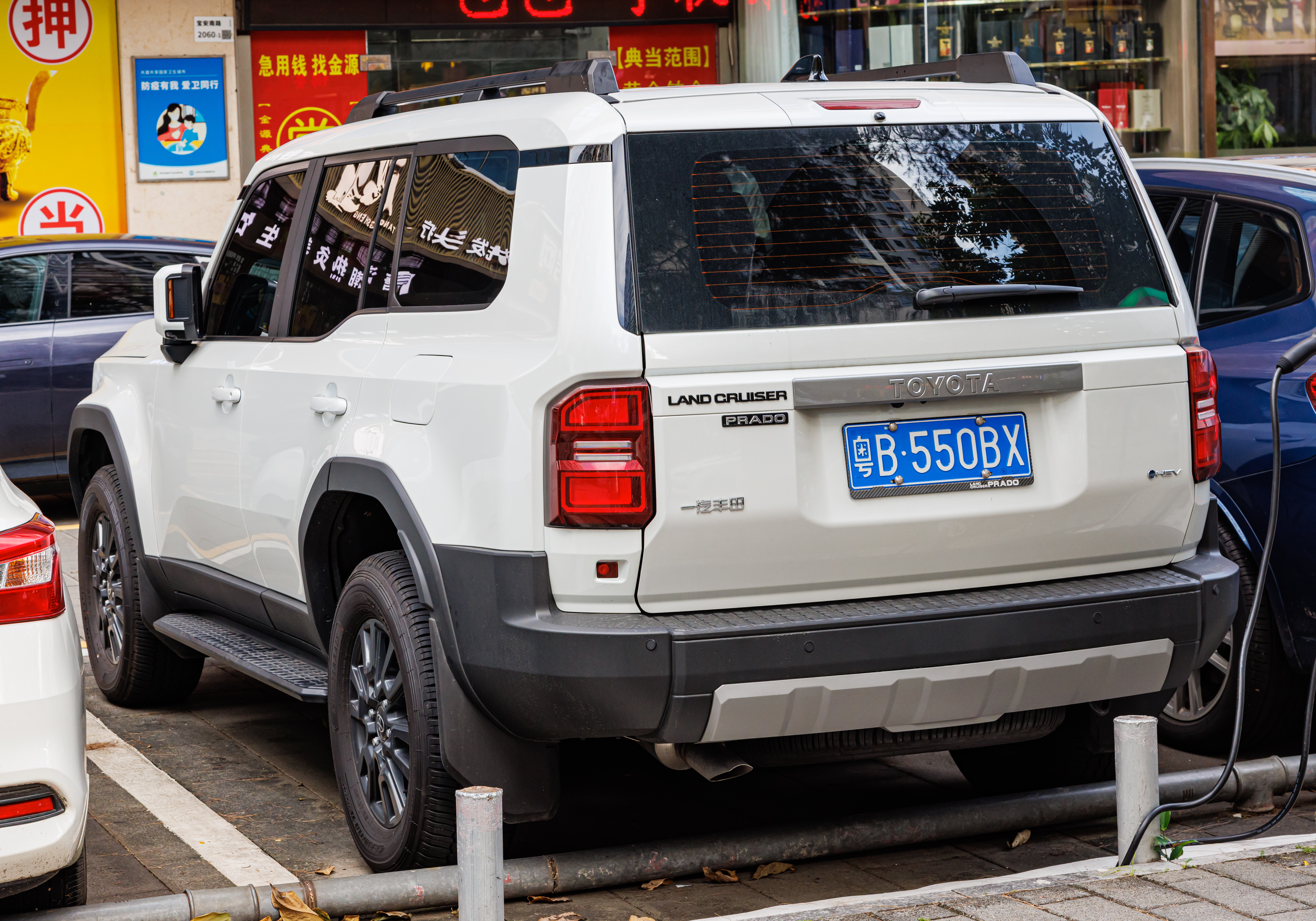
Rear view

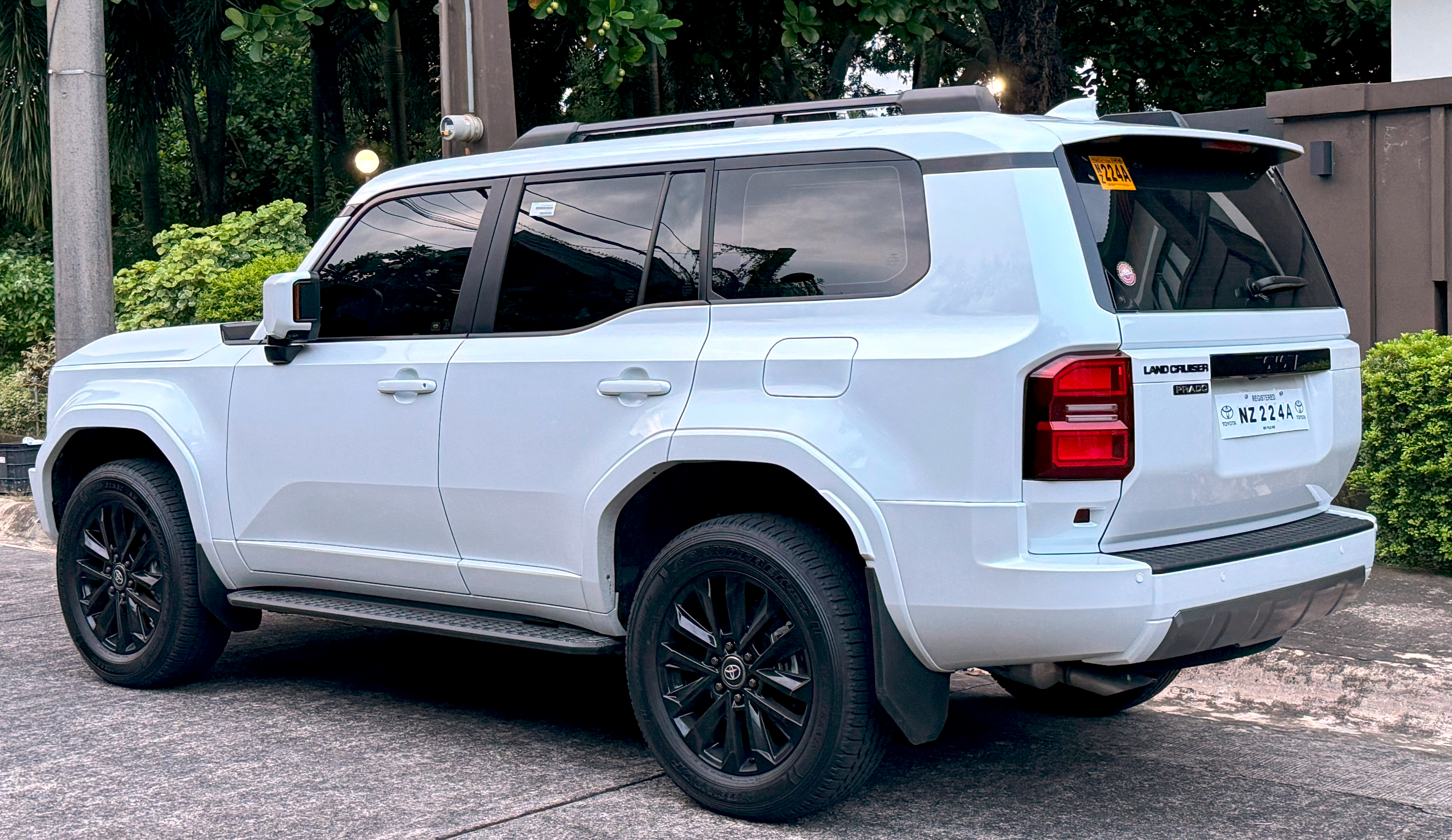
Rear view (with single tone paint)

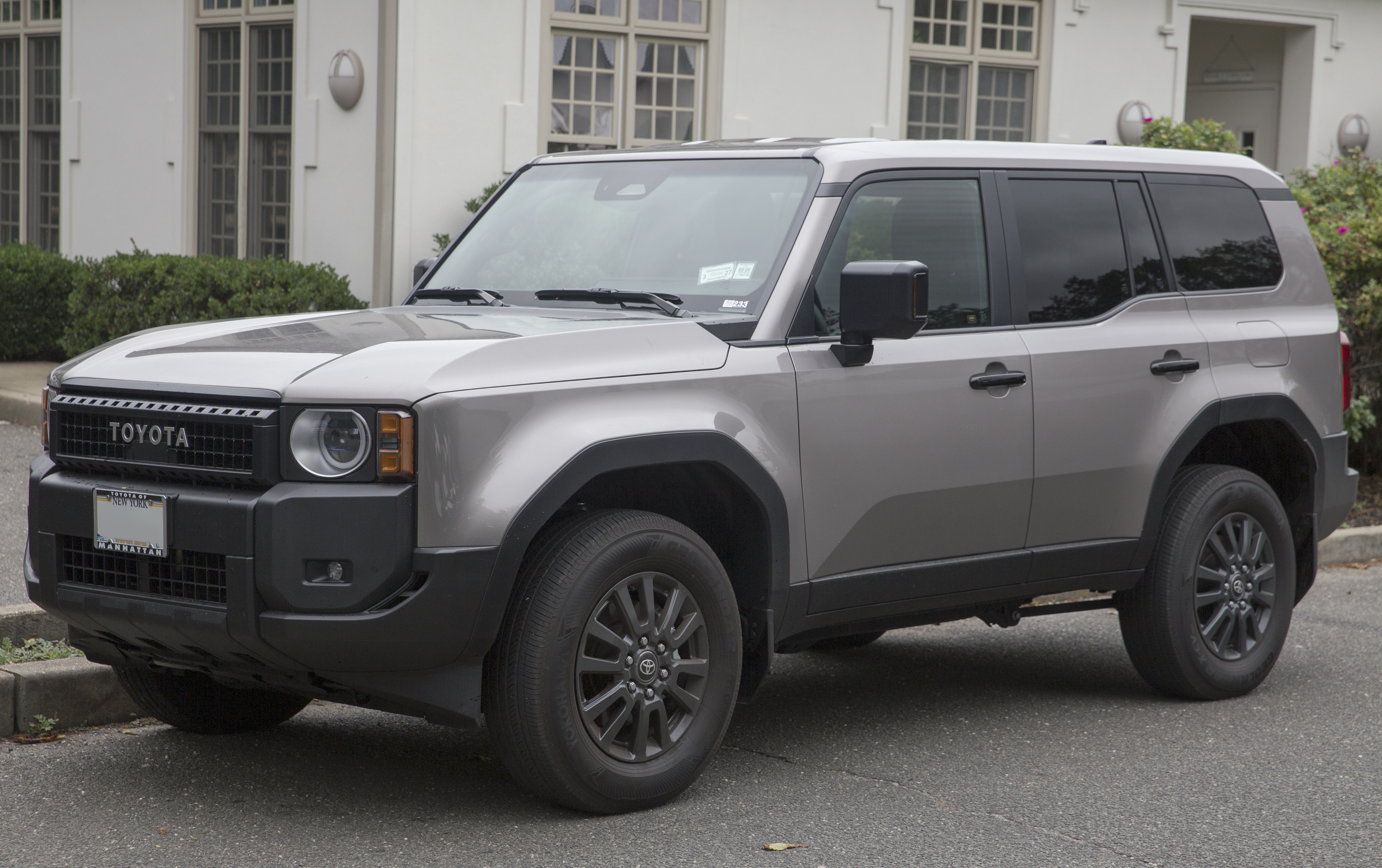
Land Cruiser 1958 Edition, with round headlights and simplified trim (US)

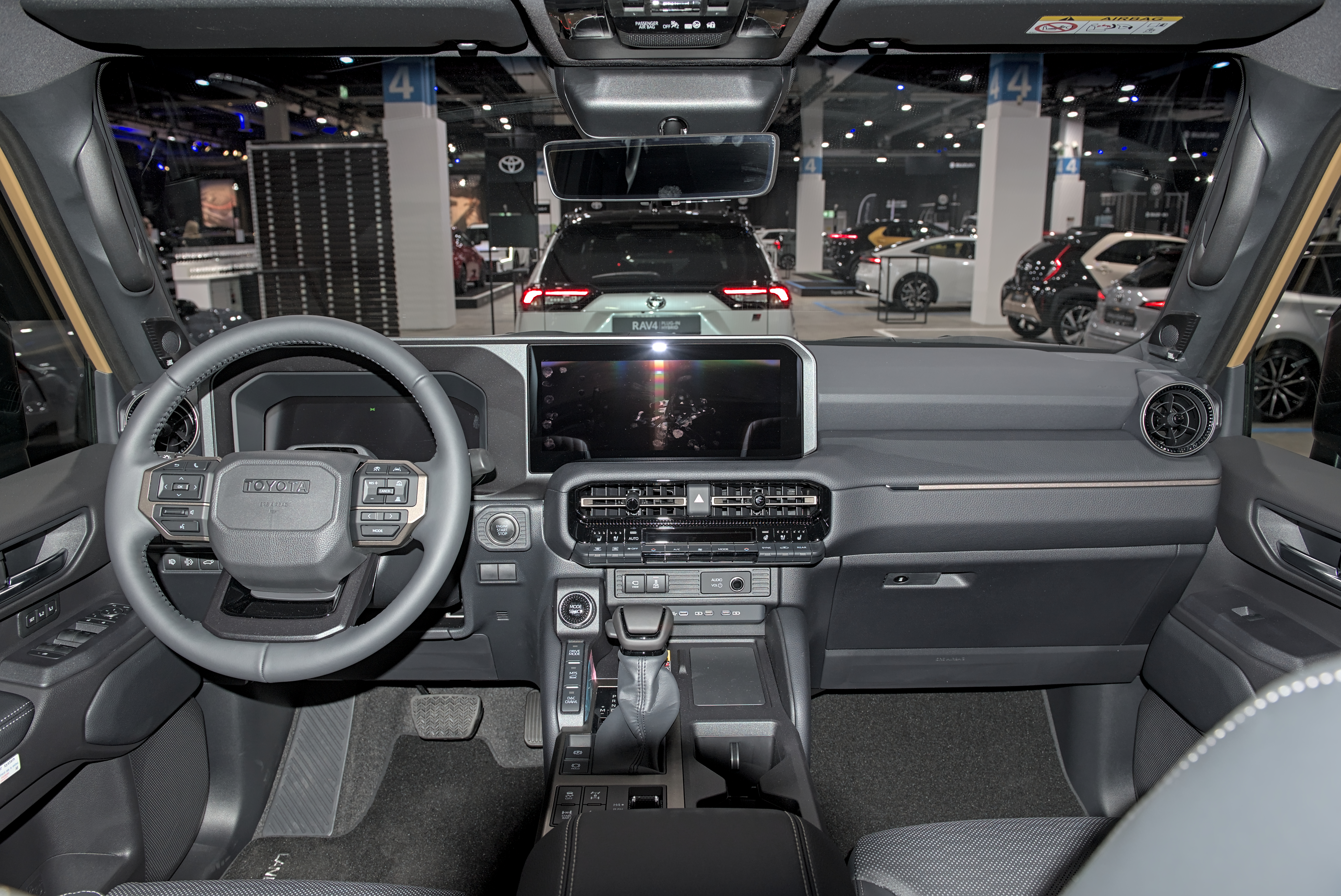
Interior

=== Markets ===
==== Africa ====
===== South Africa =====
The Land Cruiser Prado was launched in South Africa on 3 June 2024, with two grades available: TX and VX-R; it is powered by a 1GD-FTV 2.8-litre turbocharged diesel engine. At launch, there is the First Edition (FE) limited-edition model based on the VX-R range available for the first consumers. In November 2025, the flagship VX-L grade was added.

==== East Asia ====
===== China =====
The Chinese market Land Cruiser Prado was previewed in November 2023 at the Guangzhou Auto Show. It went on sale in April 2024 as a locally assembled model after the Land Cruiser Prado model of the previous generation had been discontinued in June 2020. It is produced and sold by FAW Toyota in Sichuan, which previously produced the older Prado generations. Available grade levels are BX 5-seater, TX 5-seater, TX 6-seater, and WX 6-seater. The 2.4 litre T24A-FTS petrol hybrid engine and 8-speed automatic transmission is standard across the range.

===== Japan =====
The J250 series was unveiled in Japan on 18 April 2024, and went on sale the same day. The J250 series offered on 7-seater VX powered by a 2.7 L 2TR-FE I4 petrol and a 6-speed automatic transmission. Meanwhile, the GX, and the ZX, powered by a 2.8 L 1GD-FTV turbo diesel I4 and a 8-speed automatic transmission. On 3 April 2026, the round headlight option became available as a manufacturer option.

A special edition, "First Edition" was released the same day with limited run of the 8,000 units.

The Land Cruiser Prado is renamed to the Land Cruiser 250 for this generation in Japan. It is sold alongside the J300 series Land Cruiser and heavy-duty J70 series Land Cruiser that went on sale in late 2023 after years of absence.

===== Taiwan =====
The J250 series Land Cruiser was launched in Taiwan on 10 July 2025, in the sole 7-seater variant powered by a 1GD-FTV 2.8-litre turbocharged diesel engine with the mild-hybrid 48V system.

==== Europe ====
In most European markets, the J250 series Land Cruiser is marketed simply as the Land Cruiser. In European countries where the Land Cruiser 300 is available, the J250 retains the Prado nameplate. It is powered by a 2.8-litre four-cylinder turbo-diesel engine carried over from the previous generation.

==== Middle East ====
The Land Cruiser Prado for the GCC markets was first revealed in Kuwait on 23 June 2024 and the United Arab Emirates on 24 June 2024. It is powered by the T24A-FTS 2.4-litre turbocharged petrol engine and the 1GD-FTV 2.8-litre turbocharged diesel engine.

Each market have their own specifications as follows:

Trims	Bahrain	Kuwait	Oman	Qatar	Saudi Arabia	UAE	Yemen
Trims	Standard All Rounder Adventure	VX TX WX	Deluxe Classic Premium Luxury Adventure	Classic All Rounder Adventure	TX TXL Adventure VXL (2025)	TXR GXR GXL Adventure VXR (2025)	TX TX-L Adventure

A First Edition trim was also offered in some markets during launch which came with round headlights, unique badges and wider tyres.

In 2025, "VXL" trim was introduced for the Saudi Market and in UAE, the VXR trim, featuring the vertical-slatted grille and "T" badge from the Australian market's VX and Kakadu trims.

==== North America ====
===== United States =====
In North America, the J250 series Land Cruiser replaces the J200 series Land Cruiser (which was discontinued in 2021, but replaced in other markets by the J300 Land Cruiser) as the model carrying the Land Cruiser nameplate in North America. Unlike the previous J200 model, the J250 model is physically smaller and features a more boxy and utilitarian design, with a lower starting price compared to the J200. While the J200 is a full-size three-row SUV, the J250 model is a mid-size SUV with two-row seating for this market.

The range includes three trim levels consisting of the base Land Cruiser 1958, mid-level Land Cruiser model, and the Land Cruiser First Edition limited to 5,000 units during the first year of production. The 1958 has round headlights, extended unpainted plastic body panels, and cloth seats. The Land Cruiser has rectangular headlights and painted body panels, heated and ventilated front seats, an available console cool box, a 2,400-watt inverter, colour-selectable fog lights by RIGID, wider tyres, and a locking rear differential and stabilizer disconnect mechanism. The First Edition adds a roof rack, rock rails and a front skid plate, while keeping the 1958's round headlights.

The only engine option available is a hybrid powertrain (marketed as "i-Force Max"), featuring a turbocharged 2.4-litre T24A-FTS four-cylinder petrol engine. Towing capacity is rated at 6,000 lb (2,722 kg).

==== Oceania ====
===== Australia =====
The Australian market J250 series Land Cruiser continues to be marketed as the Land Cruiser Prado, with local introduction in mid-2024.

The J250 series Land Cruiser Prado was launched in Australia in June 2024 with the same trim levels as the fourth generation: GX, GXL, Altitude, VX, and Kakadu. It is only available with 1GD-FTV 2.8-litre turbocharged diesel engine with the mild-hybrid 48V system. The higher-spec VX and Kakadu trims come with an exclusive grille with glossy vertical slats and the Toyota "T" badge instead of the Toyota lettering.

==== South Asia ====
===== Pakistan =====
In Pakistan, the Land Cruiser 250 is available in two trim levels, the TX with the 2.7-litre 2TR-FE petrol engine mated to a 6-speed automatic transmission and the VX with the 2.8-litre 1GD-FTV turbodiesel engine with an 8-speed automatic transmission.

===== Sri Lanka =====
The Land Cruiser 250 was introduced in the Sri Lankan market on 1 February 2025 after the relaxation of the ban on vehicle imports. It is available in the Sri Lankan market in "All Rounder" and "Lux" variants powered by 1GD-FTV 2.8-litre turbo-diesel engine with an 8-speed automatic transmission.

==== Southeast Asia ====
===== Brunei =====
The Land Cruiser Prado was launched in Brunei market on 17 January 2025 in VX and TX variants powered by a 1GD-FTV 2.8-litre turbodiesel engine mated with 8-speed automatic transmission.

===== Philippines =====
The Land Cruiser Prado was launched in the Philippines on 7 June 2024 in a sole variant powered by a T24A-FTS 2.4-litre turbocharged petrol engine. Instead of the standard grille in other markets, the Land Cruiser Prado for the Philippine market features the vertical-slatted grille and the Toyota T badge from the Australian VX and Kakadu trims.

===== Vietnam =====
The Land Cruiser Prado was launched in Vietnam on 16 October 2024 in a sole variant powered by a T24A-FTS 2.4-litre turbocharged petrol engine. For the Vietnamese market, the variant also available with a panoramic sunroof option.

=== Powertrain ===
Five powertrain types were announced, including one petrol hybrid and one diesel mild hybrid marketed by Toyota as a "48V system". All engines are exclusively four-cylinder.

Type	Engine code	Displacement	Power	Torque	Combined system output	Battery	Transmission	Model code	Layout	Markets
Petrol	T24A-FTS	2,393 cc (2.4 L) I4 turbocharged	207 kW (278 hp; 281 PS)	430 N⋅m (43.8 kg⋅m; 317 lb⋅ft)	-	-	8-speed "Direct Shift" automatic	TJA250	4WD	Middle East, Eastern Europe and others
Petrol hybrid	T24A-FTS	2,393 cc (2.4 L) I4 turbocharged	Engine: to be announced Front motor: to be announced	Engine: to be announced Front motor: to be announced	243 kW (326 hp; 330 PS) / 630 N⋅m (64.2 kg⋅m; 465 lb⋅ft)	1.87 kWh, 6.5 Ah, 288 V NiMH	8-speed "Direct Shift" automatic	TJH250	4WD	North America and China
Petrol	2TR-FE	2,693 cc (2.7 L) I4	120 kW (161 hp; 163 PS)	246 N⋅m (25.1 kg⋅m; 181 lb⋅ft)	-	-	6-speed automatic	TRJ250	4WD	Eastern Europe, Japan and others
Diesel	1GD-FTV	2,755 cc (2.8 L) I4 turbocharged	150 kW (201 hp; 204 PS)	500 N⋅m (51.0 kg⋅m; 369 lb⋅ft)	-	-	6-speed automatic	GDJ250	4WD	Europe, Japan, Middle East and others
Diesel	1GD-FTV	2,755 cc (2.8 L) I4 turbocharged	150 kW (201 hp; 204 PS)	500 N⋅m (51.0 kg⋅m; 369 lb⋅ft)	-	-	8-speed "Direct Shift" automatic	GDJ250	4WD	Europe, Japan, Middle East and others
Diesel mild hybrid	1GD-FTV	2,755 cc (2.8 L) I4 turbocharged	150 kW (201 hp; 204 PS)	500 N⋅m (51.0 kg⋅m; 369 lb⋅ft)	-	To be announced	8-speed "Direct Shift" automatic	GDJ250	4WD	Australia, Western Europe

=== Safety ===
ANCAP test results Toyota Prado (2024, aligned with Euro NCAP)
Test	Points	%
Overall:	5 /5 stars	
Adult occupant:	34.39	85%
Child occupant:	43.62	89%
Pedestrian:	53.38	84%
Safety assist:	14.83	82%

== Sales ==
Calendar year	Japan	Australia	Europe	US
1999			28,238	
2000			20,657	
2001	14,696		21,115	
2002	15,135		17,186	
2003	17,881		33,435	
2004	12,918		35,370	
2005	13,586		36,302	
2006	12,051		28,381	
2007	11,820		26,670	
2008	8,830		18,852	
2009	6,601		8,362	
2010	6,610		12,334	
2011	9,273		10,996	
2012	11,430	17,045	9,172	
2013	9,600	14,568	5,444	
2014	15,950	16,112	6,258	
2015	19,770	15,255	6,052	
2016	17,310	14,730	6,286	
2017	18,360	15,982	5,237	
2018	25,830	18,553	6,977	
2019	25,830	18,335	6,359	
2020	24,370	18,034	4,489	
2021	30,990	21,299	4,458	
2022	31,050	21,102	33,872	
2023	55,263	20,710	23,988	
2024		9,802	20,282	29,113
2025		26,106		43,946

== See also ==
- 70-series Toyota Land Cruiser
- 300-series Toyota Land Cruiser
