= Toyota 4Runner =

Sport utility vehicle manufactured by Toyota

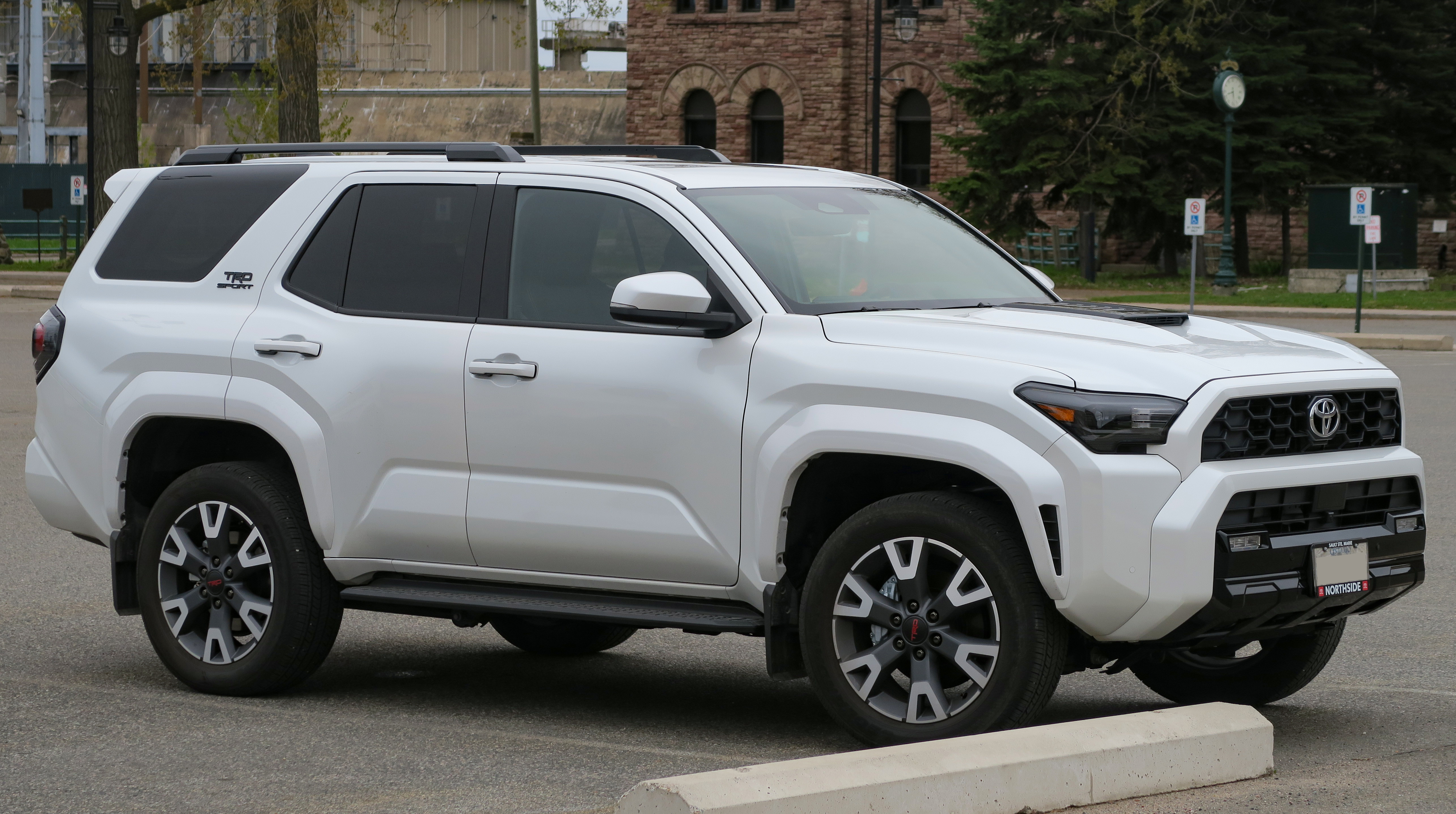
- 2025 Toyota 4Runner TRD Sport (N500)

Overview
- Manufacturer: Toyota
- Also called: Toyota Hilux Surf (Japan, 1983–2009)
- Production: October 1983 – present
- Model years: 1984–present (US)

Body and chassis
- Class: Compact SUV (1984–1995); Mid-size SUV (1995–present)
- Layout: Front-engine, rear-wheel-drive; Front-engine, four-wheel-drive
- Chassis: Body-on-frame

Chronology
- Successor: Toyota Fortuner/SW4 (Asia/South America); Toyota FJ Cruiser (Japan)

The Toyota 4Runner is an SUV manufactured by the Japanese automaker Toyota and marketed globally since 1984, across six generations. In Japan, it was marketed as the Toyota Hilux Surf (Japanese: トヨタ・ハイラックスサーフ, Hepburn: Toyota Hairakkususāfu) and was withdrawn from the market in 2009. The original 4Runner was a compact SUV and little more than a Toyota Hilux pickup truck with a fiberglass shell over the bed, but the model has since undergone significant independent development into a cross between a compact and a mid-size SUV. All 4Runners have been built in Japan at Toyota's plant in Tahara, Aichi, or at the Hino Motors (a Toyota subsidiary) plant in Hamura. In Japan, it was available at the Toyota Japan dealership retail chains called Toyota Store and Toyopet Store.

The name "4Runner" was created by copywriter Robert Nathan for the Saatchi & Saatchi advertising company as a play on the term "forerunner". The agency held contests to invent new names for Toyota's upcoming vehicles. According to Toyota, the "4" described the vehicle's 4-wheel drive system while "Runner" was a reference to its all-terrain capabilities and how it could "run" off-road.

As of 2021, the 4Runner is sold primarily in North America, Central America and some South American countries. Many markets that do not offer the 4Runner, such as Europe, Asia, and the Middle East, receive the Land Cruiser Prado instead. For some markets, the 4Runner was branded the Hilux Surf, which was replaced by the Fortuner, a similar but lower-cost alternative based on the Hilux platform.

The 4Runner placed number five in a 2019 study by iSeeCars.com ranking the longest-lasting vehicles in the US. According to the study, 3.94% of 4Runners had a mileage of over 200,000 miles (320,000 km).

== Predecessor: Toyota Trekker (N30; 1981–1983) ==
Toyota Trekker
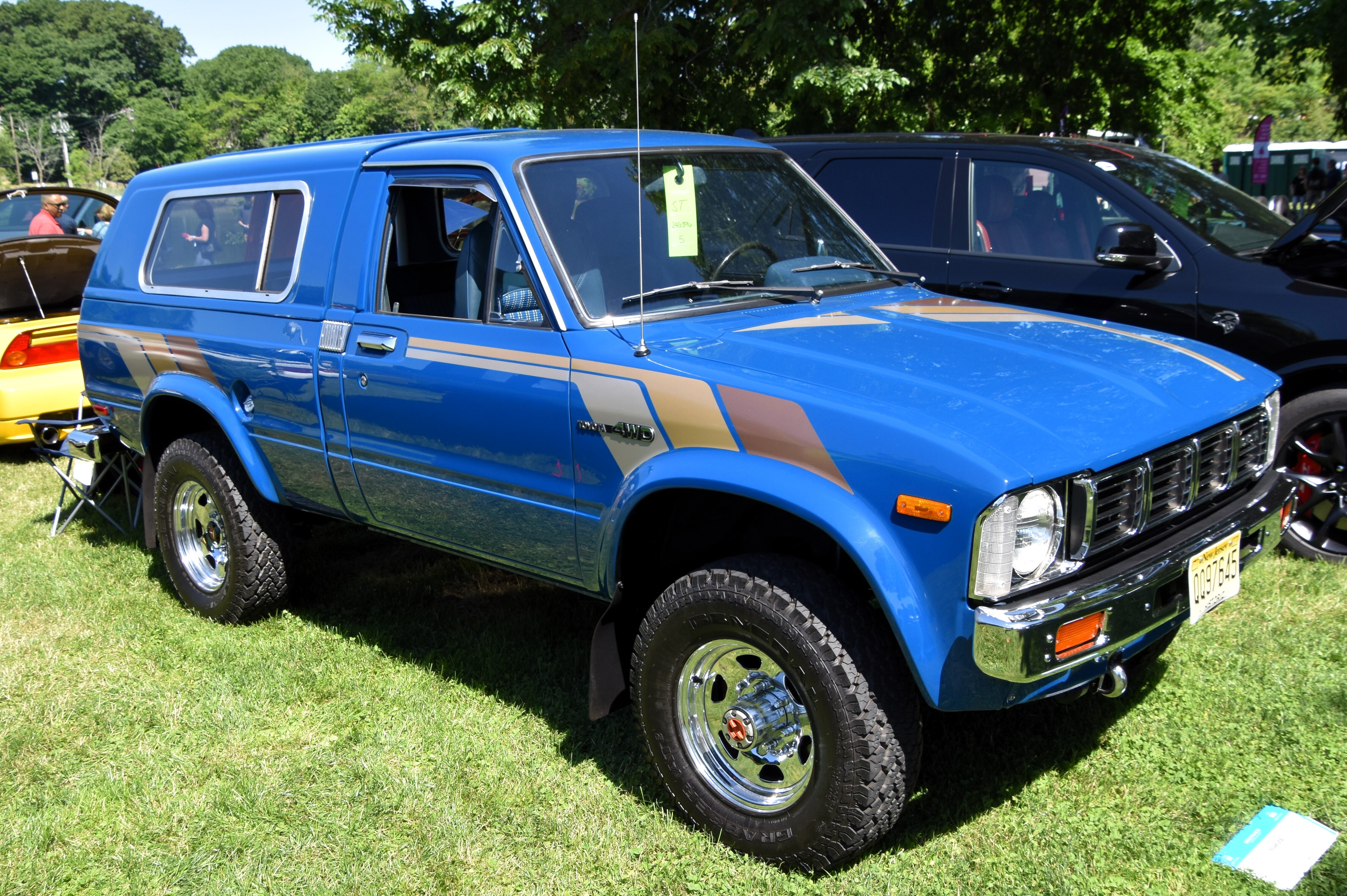

Overview
- Manufacturer: Toyota; Conversion by Winnebago
- Model code: N30
- Production: 1981–1983
- Assembly: United States: Forest City, Iowa (Winnebago)

Body and chassis
- Body style: 2-door pickup
- Related: Toyota Hilux/Pickup (N30/N40)

Powertrain
- Engine: Gasoline: 2.4 L 22R I4 (RN38)
- Power output: 96–100 hp (97–101 PS; 72–75 kW)
- Transmission: 5-speed L52 manual

Dimensions
- Wheelbase: 2,596 mm (102.2 in)
- Length: 4,321 mm (170.1 in)
- Width: 1,689 mm (66.5 in)
- Height: 1,674 mm (65.9 in)
- Curb weight: 1,415 kg (3,120 lb)

Toyota had partnered with third-party recreational vehicle manufacturers at least as early as 1973, when a Chinook Mobilodge-built popup truck camper was paired with the longbed Toyota truck chassis and sold as a less expensive, more economical alternative to larger motorhomes. In the Chinook conversion, the bed and rear wall of the cab were removed and a fiberglass popup shell was added, allowing occupants to walk through from the motorhome section to the cab.

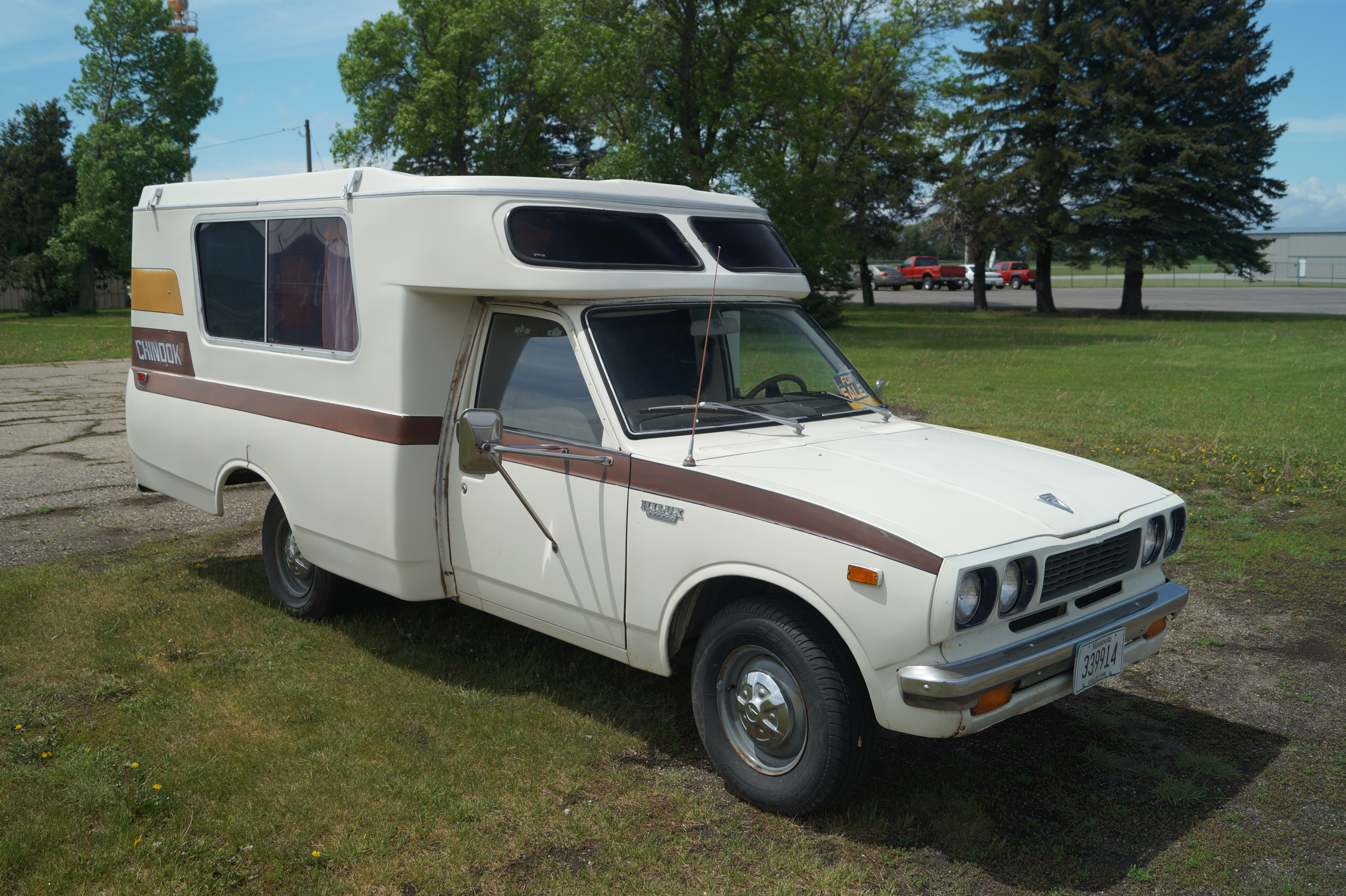
1974 Hilux/Chinook

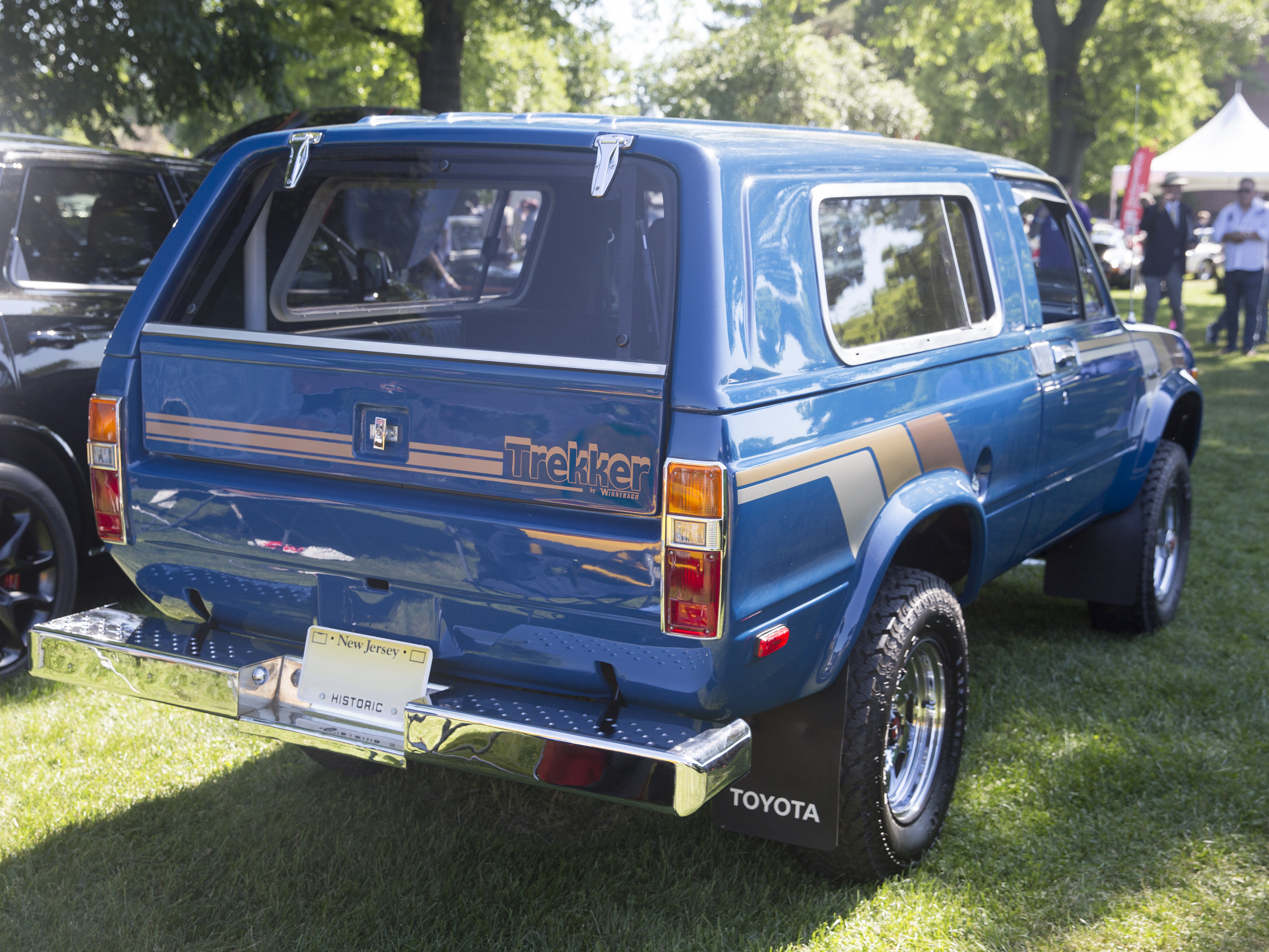
1981 Trekker rear view

The Trekker was a similar "walk-through" third-party conversion of the short-bed Toyota Hilux truck, built by Winnebago Industries from 1981 to 1983. Winnebago removed the rear wall and added a bench seat in the bed, protecting these occupants by a permanently fixed fiberglass shell; in concept, it was similar to the Chevrolet K5 Blazer. The Trekker competed with similar third-party limited production Toyota conversions including the Breaker-Breaker and Trailblazer. The Trekker was discontinued in 1984 once Toyota started producing and selling the 4Runner SUV; these third-party conversions had in essence acted as marketing test vehicles for the 4Runner.

=== Production ===
After the Land Cruiser FJ40 was discontinued, Jack Safro, who operated a Toyota dealership in Brookfield, Wisconsin, approached Winnebago with the idea to convert the Hilux into a four-passenger vehicle as a potential replacement. The resulting Trekker was produced from early 1981 through 1983. In total, approximately 1200–1500 Trekkers were built and sold in the United States, with many shipped to Colorado. An additional unknown number of Trekker kits, likely less than 200, were shipped to Canada to be installed on Canadian trucks at the dealerships. 20 to 30 of the Trekker kits were sold and shipped to Saudi Arabia for installation.

Toyota shipped all trucks from Japan as cab and chassis in order to avoid the 25% assembled truck customs tax. All Trekkers were built on the short wheelbase Hilux chassis. The trucks destined for production as Trekkers were shipped to the dealership handling the national distribution of the Trekker. From there they went to Winnebago to have the Trekker conversion installed, returned after completion to the dealership for national distribution. Most of the Trekker conversions sold went to the west coast of the United States.

=== Specifications ===
The Trekker conversion involved removing the bed and rear cab wall from the donor truck, then replacing them with a fiberglass tub, bed sides, a non-removable canopy and rear hatch. The kit included a folding rear seat that could be folded forward to lay flat and add cargo space to the back. There was no tailgate on the Trekkers. The factory Toyota vinyl cab headliner was replaced and matched to the custom rear canopy headliner. Suggested retail price in 1981 was US$13,000 (equivalent to $46,000 in 2025).

All Trekkers were given the SR5 trim designation by both Winnebago and Toyota, regardless of the actual VIN denotation. Originally there were to be Deluxe (Model 7141) and Deluxe SR5 (Model 7147) versions of the Trekker; the SR5 was to be equipped with a 5-speed manual transmission, vented canopy windows, and a more finished rear interior than the Deluxe, which was to be equipped with a 4-speed manual and fixed windows. Regardless of trim level, all 1981 Trekkers had vented canopy windows. Non-vented canopy windows were installed on the Trekker for the 1982 model year (again, regardless of trim level) because the forward-facing vent windows on the 1981 Trekkers developed leaks.

As tested by Truckin' in 1981, the observed fuel consumption was 19.3 mpg_{‑US} (12.2 L/100 km; 23.2 mpg_{‑imp}) in combined (city and highway) driving, dropping to 17.4 mpg_{‑US} (13.5 L/100 km; 20.9 mpg_{‑imp}) with off-road use. The enclosed cargo area was 60 ft^{3} (1.7 m^{3}) with the rear bench folded.

== First generation (N60; 1983) ==
First generation
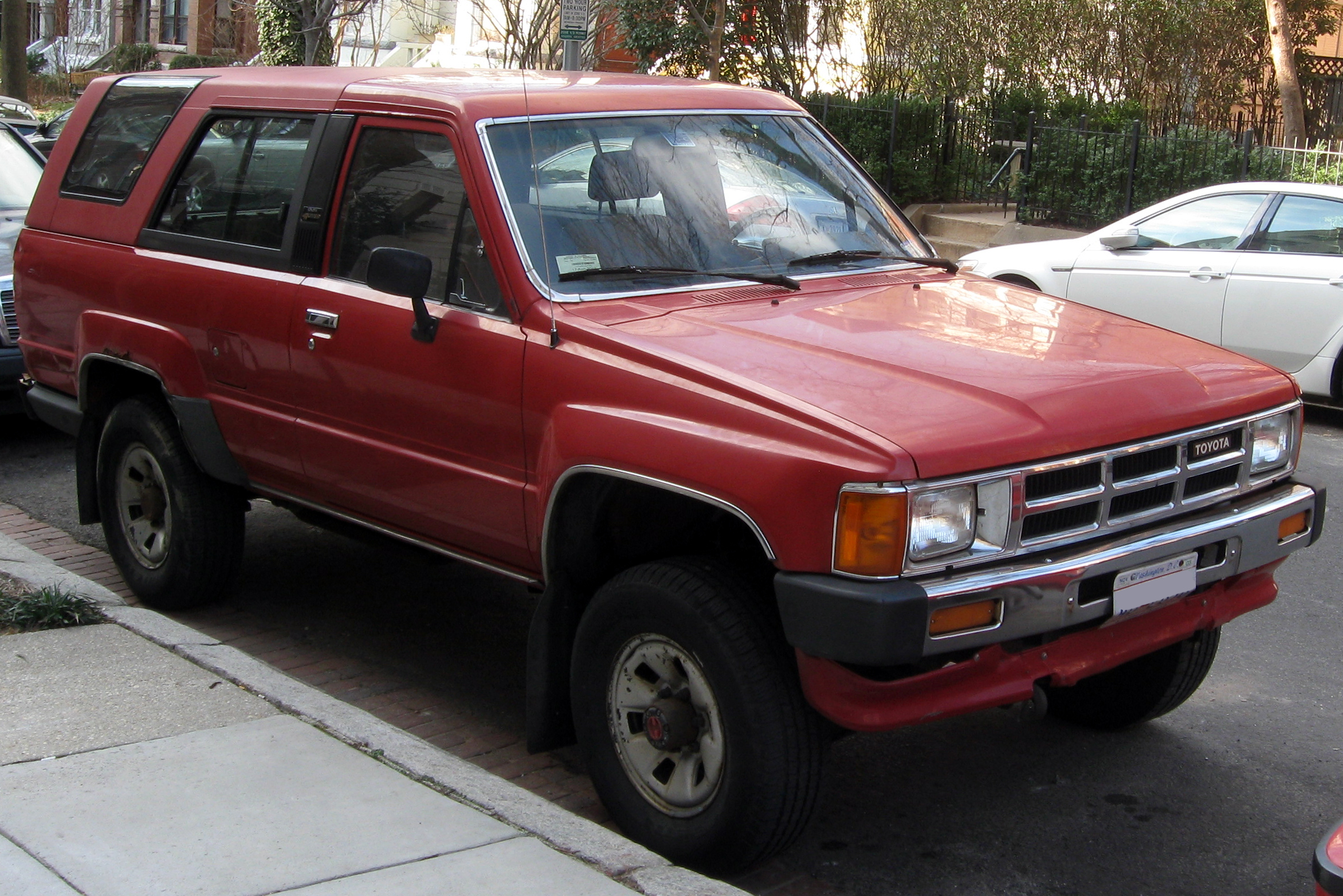

Overview
- Model code: N60
- Also called: Toyota Hilux Surf (Japan); Toyota Hilux 4Runner
- Production: October 1983 – August 1989
- Model years: 1984–1989 (US)
- Assembly: Japan: Tahara, Aichi

Body and chassis
- Class: Compact SUV
- Body style: 3-door SUV
- Related: Toyota Hilux/Pickup (N60)

Powertrain
- Engine: Gasoline: 2.0 L 3Y-EU I4; 2.2 L 4Y-C I4; 2.4 L 22R I4; 2.4 L 22R-E I4; 2.4 L 22R-TE turbo I4; 3.0 L 3VZ-E V6; Diesel: 2.4 L 2L I4 (1984–1989); 2.4 L 2L-T turbo I4 (1985–1989)
- Transmission: 5-speed manual; 4-speed automatic

Dimensions
- Wheelbase: 2,616 mm (103.0 in)
- Length: 4,435 mm (174.6 in)
- Width: 1,689 mm (66.5 in)
- Height: 1,679 mm (66.1 in)
- Curb weight: 1,597–1,706 kg (3,520–3,760 lb)

For the first generation N60 series Hilux Surf and export specification 4Runner introduced in 1983, Toyota, instead of developing an entirely new model, modified the existing Hilux (N50/N60/N70) with short-bed pickup body. The Hilux had undergone a major redesign in 1983 for the 1984 model year. Compared to the pickup, the Surf/4Runner changes included the removal of the panel with integrated rear window from behind the front seats, and adding rear seats, a roll bar, and a removable fiberglass canopy.

The concept was borrowed from both the second generation Ford Bronco, and the Chevrolet K5 Blazer, which were both based on existing short-bed pickup trucks with the addition of removable fiberglass shells over the rear sections and bench seats installed in the back. Like the Bronco and the Blazer, the Hilux Surf/4Runner also removed the rear wall behind the front seats in the corresponding pickup trucks. In that sense, all three vehicles were more modified than simply adding a fiberglass shell to conventional pickup trucks.

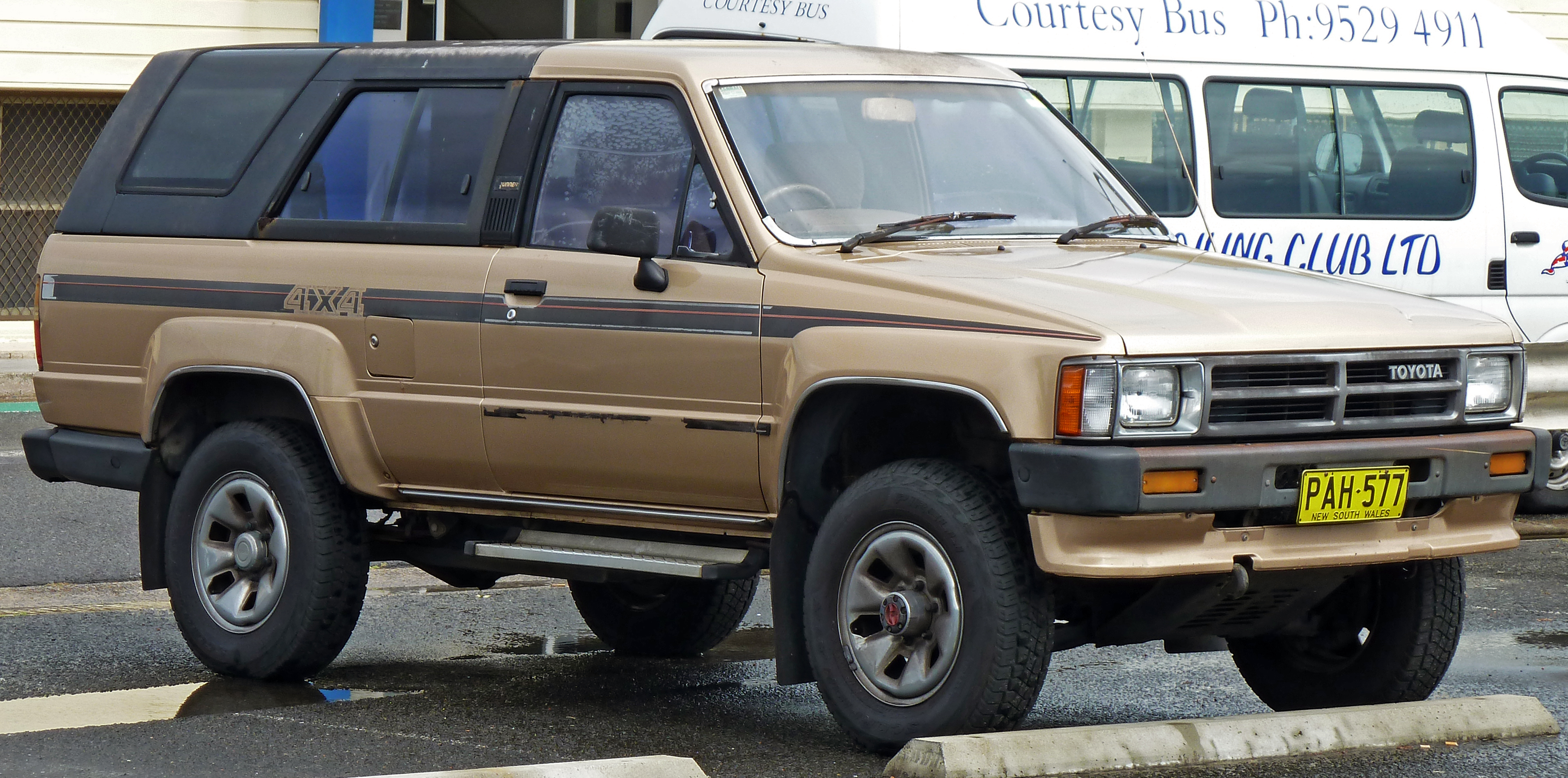

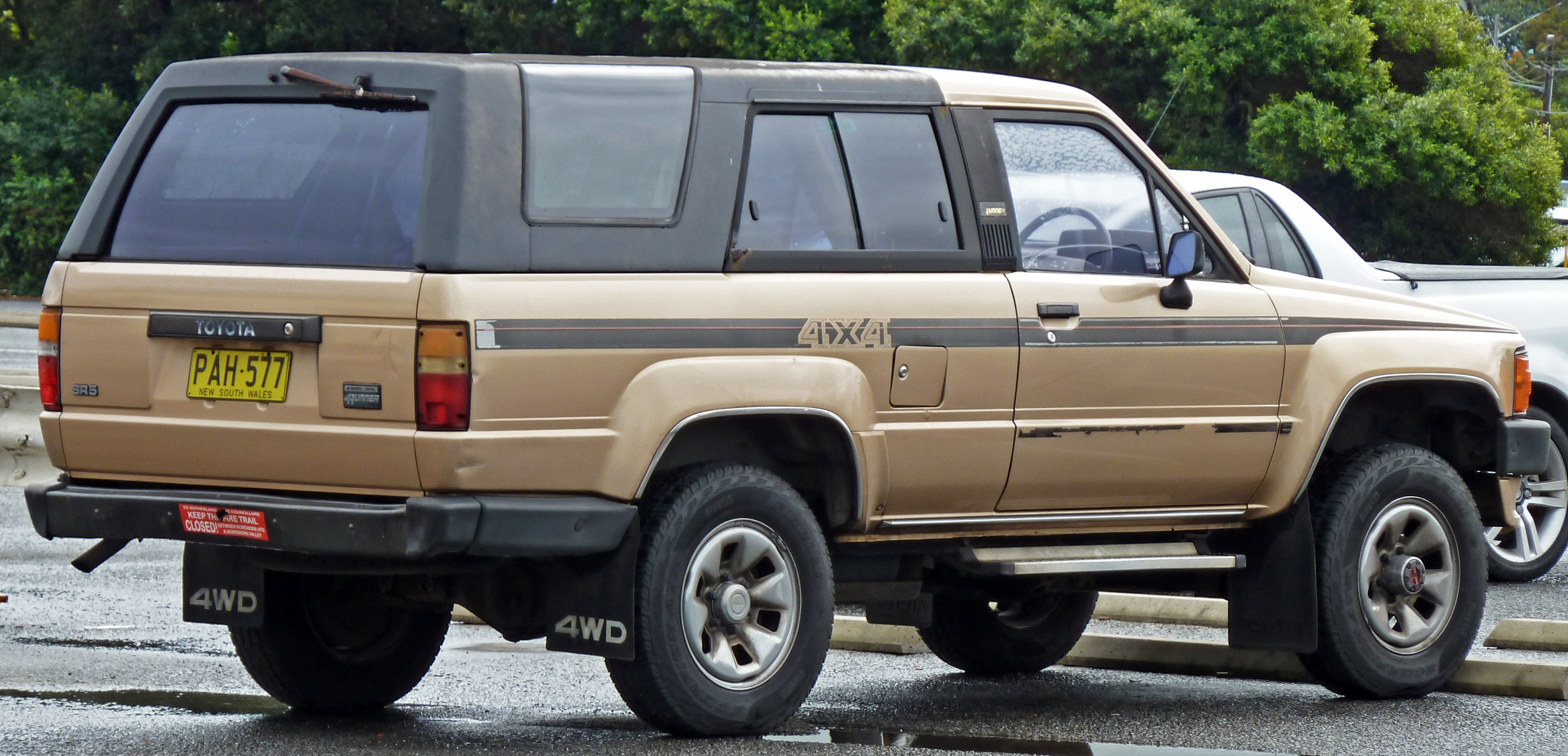
1987–1989 Toyota 4Runner SR5 (Australia)

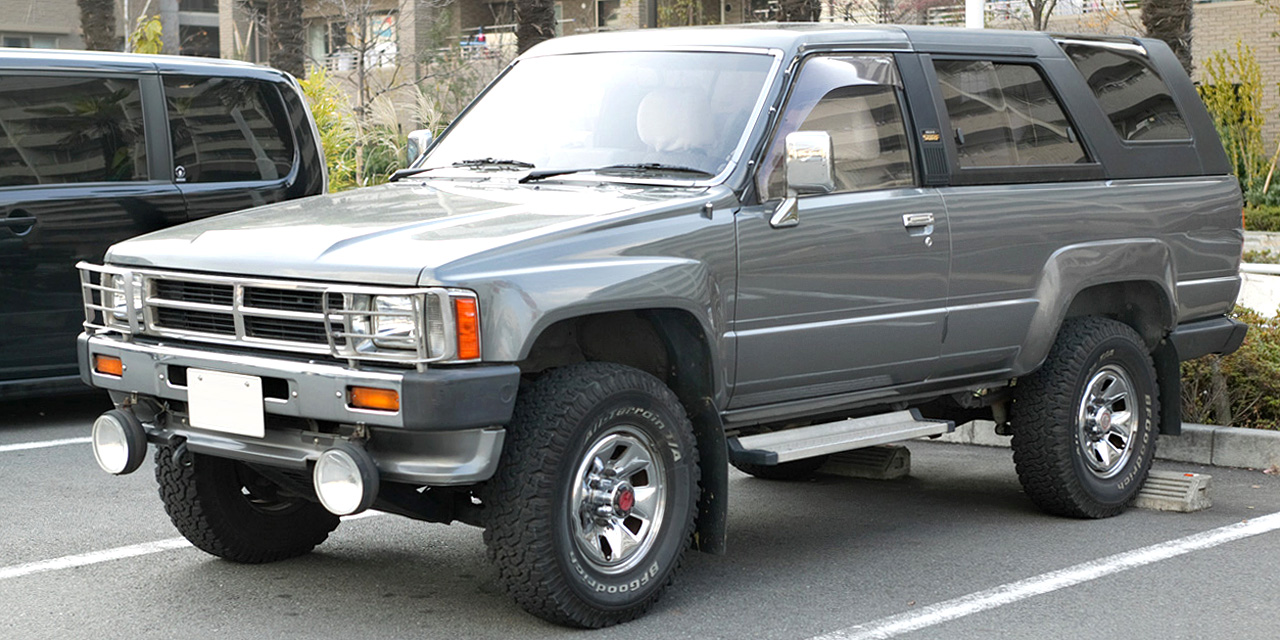
1987–1989 Toyota Hilux Surf

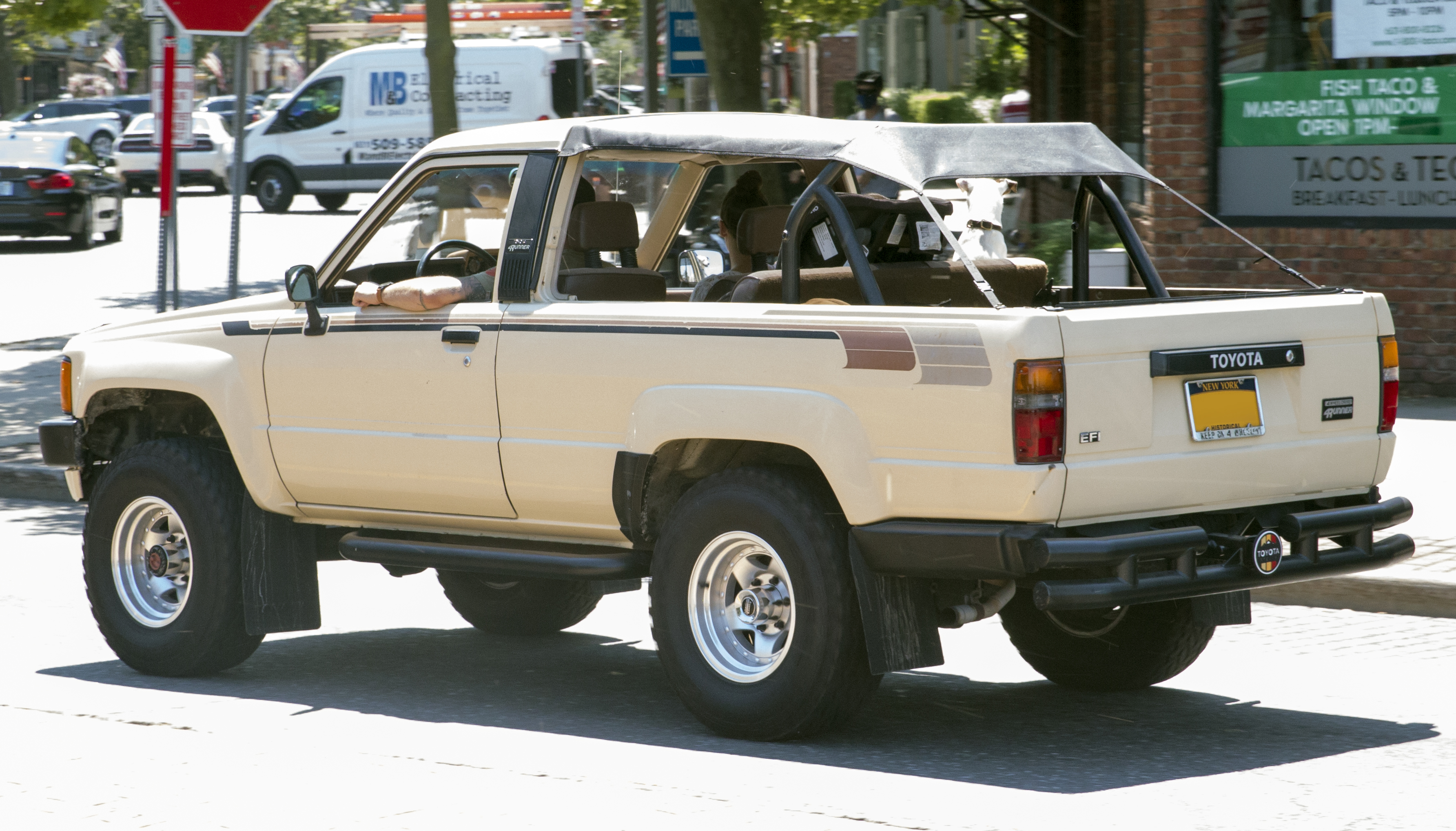
1985 Toyota 4Runner with the rear canopy removed

Thus, the first generation is nearly mechanically identical to the Toyota Hilux 4×4. All first generation 4Runners had two doors and were indistinguishable from the pickups from the dashboard forward. Nearly all changes were to the body behind the B-pillar; in fact, because the rear springs were not upgraded to bear the additional weight from the rear seats and fiberglass top, early models tended to suffer from a sagging rear suspension.

=== History ===
In North America, they were sold for the 1984½ model year starting from May 1984. For this first year (March to July 1984 production), all models were equipped with black or white fiberglass tops. The base (DX) model omitted the rear seat. An SR5 trim package was offered that upgraded the interior: additional gauges, better fabrics, and a rear seat were standard with the package. All 1984½ models were equipped with the carbureted 2.4 L 22R inline-four engine, paired with a 5-speed manual transmission; all were available with a four-wheel-drive system that drove the front wheels through a solid front axle with manual locking hubs.

The Hilux Surf was offered in two trim lines (SR and SSR), with either a 2.0 L 3Y gasoline or 2.4 L 2L diesel engine.

The 1985 model year (which began production in August 1984) saw the arrival of the electronically fuel-injected 2.4 L 22R-E (and 22R-EC with California emissions controls). This increased the power output from 96 hp (72 kW) for the 22R to 116 hp (87 kW) for the 22R-E, though the carbureted engine remained available until 1988. Additionally, rear seats were available in all 1985 4Runner trim levels, not just the more upscale SR5.

For the 1986 model year, the Surf/4Runner underwent a major front suspension design change as it was changed from a solid front axle to the Hi-Trac independent front suspension. Track width was also increased by three inches. These changes made the trucks more comfortable on-road, and improved stability and handling. The new suspension also increased the space in the engine compartment (necessary to fit larger engines, such as the V6 introduced in 1987) but arguably decreased the truck's off-road capabilities. The North American specification Toyota Pickup also adopted this new suspension, but the regular Hilux for other markets at this point retained the more rugged and capable, if less refined, solid axle configuration. With the 1986 update, the Surf/4Runner grille changed from the three segment type to the two segment grille. Tops were color-matched on blue, red and some gold models, while other body colors were still sold with black or white tops.

A turbocharged version of the 22R-E engine (the 22R-TE) was also introduced in the 1986 model year, increasing output to 135 hp (101 kW), although this engine is significantly rarer than the base 22R-E. With the 22R-TE, the 4Runner was rated at 17 mpg_{‑US} (20 mpg_{‑imp}; 14 L/100 km) on the city driving cycle; testing showed real-world economy was 14.5 mpg_{‑US} (17.4 mpg_{‑imp}; 16.2 L/100 km). It appears that all turbocharged 4Runner models sold in the US were equipped with an automatic transmission, though a five-speed manual could still be ordered in the turbocharged pickups. Most turbocharged 4Runners were equipped with the SR5 package, and all turbo trucks had as standard a heavier rear differential later used in the V6 model. Low-option models had a small light in the gauge cluster to indicate turbo boost, while more plush vehicles were equipped with an all-digital gauge cluster that included a boost gauge. Turbocharged and naturally aspirated 2.4 L 2L-T and 2L diesel engines were also available in the pickups at this time as well, but it appears that no diesel-powered 4Runners were imported to the United States.

During 1984 to 1986 many 4Runners were imported to the US without rear seats. With only two seats the vehicle could be classified as a truck (rather than a sport vehicle) and could skirt the higher customs duties placed upon sport and pleasure vehicles. Most had aftermarket seats and seat belts added by North American dealers after they were imported.

4Runner (N60) drivetrain options
MY Engine		84	85	86	87	88	89
22R I4		Yes	No	No	No	No	No
22R-E I4		No	Yes	Yes	Yes	Yes	Yes
22R-TE I4 turbo		No	No	Yes	Yes	No	No
3VZ-E V6		No	No	No	No	Yes	Yes
Transmissions	5M	Yes					
Transmissions	4A	No					

No changes were made for the 1987 model year. In 1988, the 22R-TE engine was replaced by an optional 3.0 L V6 engine, the 145 hp (108 kW) 3VZ-E, available with the SR5 trim package; the standard engine remained the 22R-E. By this time, the SR5 package added automatic locking front hubs for both the I4 and V6 engines. The V6 engine was significantly larger and more powerful although not as reliable as the original 4-cylinder offering. Trucks sold with the V6 engine were equipped with the same heavy duty rear differential that was used in the turbocharged trucks, as well as a completely new transmission and transfer case; the transfer case was chain driven, although considered less rugged, created less cab noise than the old gear-driven unit used behind the four-cylinder engine.

In New Zealand, the 4Runner was equipped with the 3Y 2.0 L I4 engine instead, followed more rarely by the 4Y 2.2 L gasoline engine in later versions. This was a decision by Toyota New Zealand to reduce parts required to be stocked by dealers as no other Toyotas sold in New Zealand at the time utilised the R series engines. The 3Y/4Y also were equipped, albeit rarely, in the Japanese domestic market pickups and never were used in the US market.

Small cosmetic and option changes were made in 1988 for the 1989 model year, but the model was left largely untouched in anticipation of the replacement model then undergoing final development.

== Second generation (N120/N130; 1989) ==
Second generation
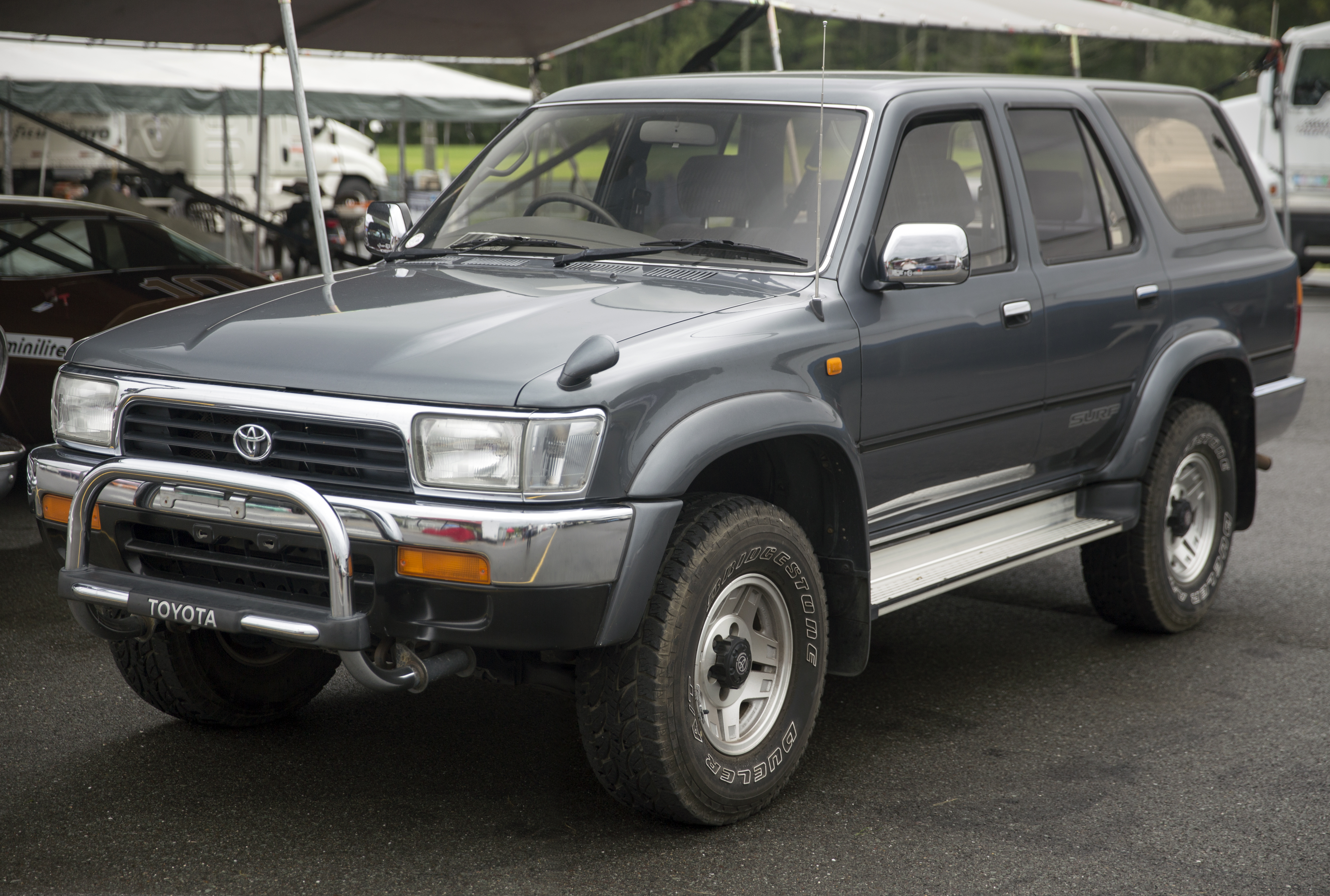

Overview
- Model code: N120; N130
- Also called: Toyota Hilux Surf (Japan); Toyota Hilux SW4 (Brazil); Jinhui 4Runner (China, JV)
- Production: 1989 – August 1995
- Model years: 1990–1995 (US)
- Assembly: Japan: Tahara, Aichi; China: Zhuhai, Guangdong

Body and chassis
- Class: Compact SUV
- Body style: 3-door SUV; 5-door SUV
- Related: Toyota Hilux/Pickup (N80/N90/N100/N110)

Powertrain
- Engine: Gasoline: 2.0 L 3Y I4; 2.2 L 4Y I4; 2.4 L 22R-E I4; 3.0 L 3VZ-E V6; Diesel: 2.4 L 2L-TE turbo I4; 2.4 L 2L-T(II) turbo I4; 2.8 L 3L I4; 3.0 L 1KZ-T turbo I4; 3.0 L 1KZ-TE turbo I4
- Transmission: 5-speed manual; 4-speed A340H automatic

Dimensions
- Wheelbase: 2,625 mm (103.3 in)
- Length: 4,470–4,490 mm (176.0–176.8 in)
- Width: 1,690 mm (66.5 in)
- Height: 1,680 mm (66.1 in)
- Curb weight: 1,705 kg (3,760 lb)

Toyota released a second generation of Hilux Surf and 4Runner in 1989 for the 1990 model year. Known as the N120/N130 series, these models continued to be based on the Hilux pickup. However, the second-generation Surf/4Runner represented a fundamental departure from the first generation model: Instead of an enhanced pickup truck with fiberglass cap, the new 4Runners featured a freshly designed, full-steel integrated body mounted on the existing frame. However, the 4Runner's appearance remained virtually identical to the Hilux from the B-pillars forward, and the powertrain was shared with the Hilux.

=== Chassis and body ===
The 4Runner and corresponding Hilux shared similar body-on-frame construction which meant parts like the front suspension of the 4WD models, differentials, engines, drivetrain parts and front fascias were interchangeable; however, instead of the Hotchkiss drive design with leaf springs used on the Hilux and first-generation 4Runner, the rear suspension of the second-generation 4Runner was a 4-link design with a Panhard rod and coil springs locating a solid axle, which unfortunately proved to be just as prone to sagging as the leaf springs on the rear of the previous models.

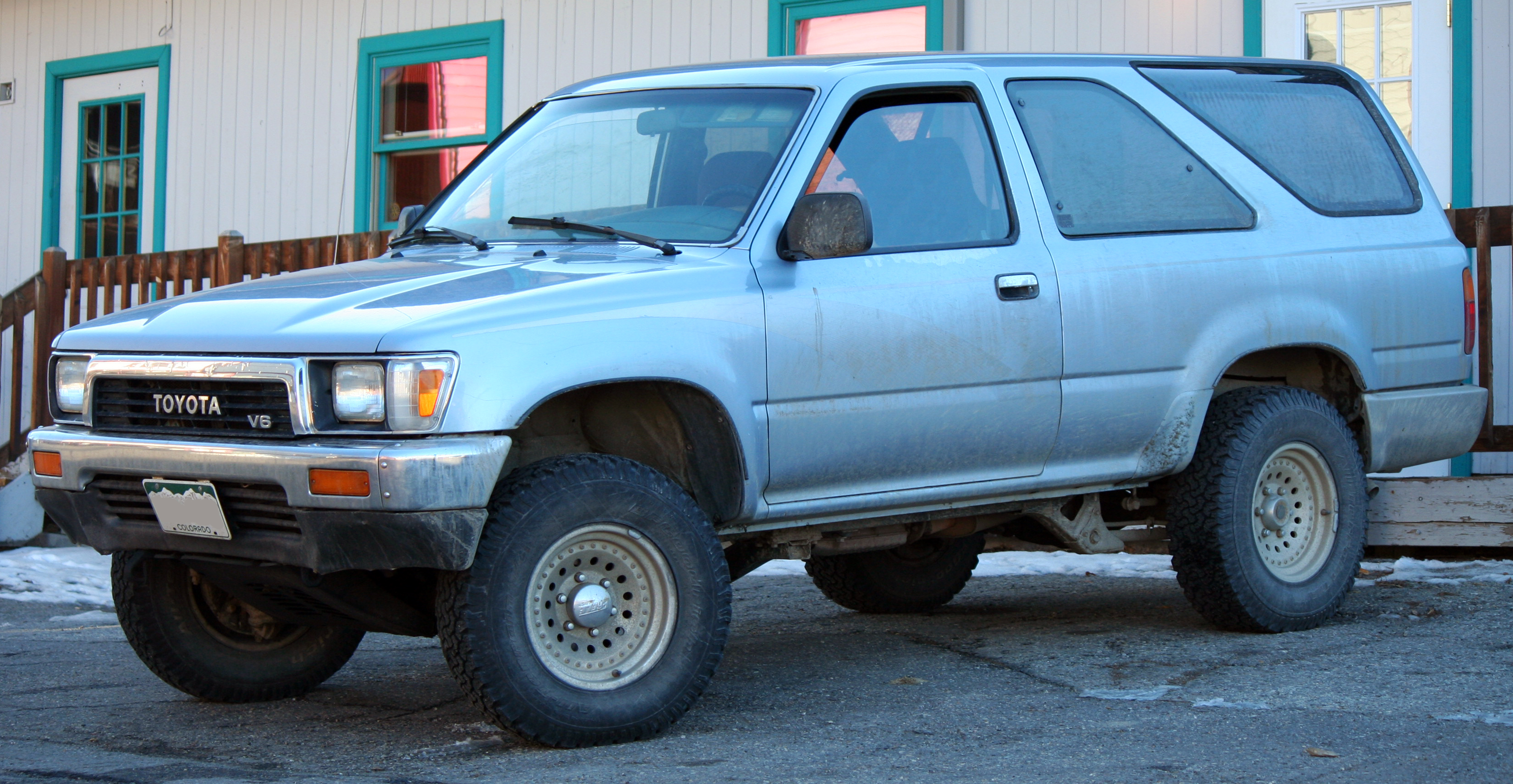
1990–1992 Toyota 4Runner V6 with two-door bodywork (VZN130; US)

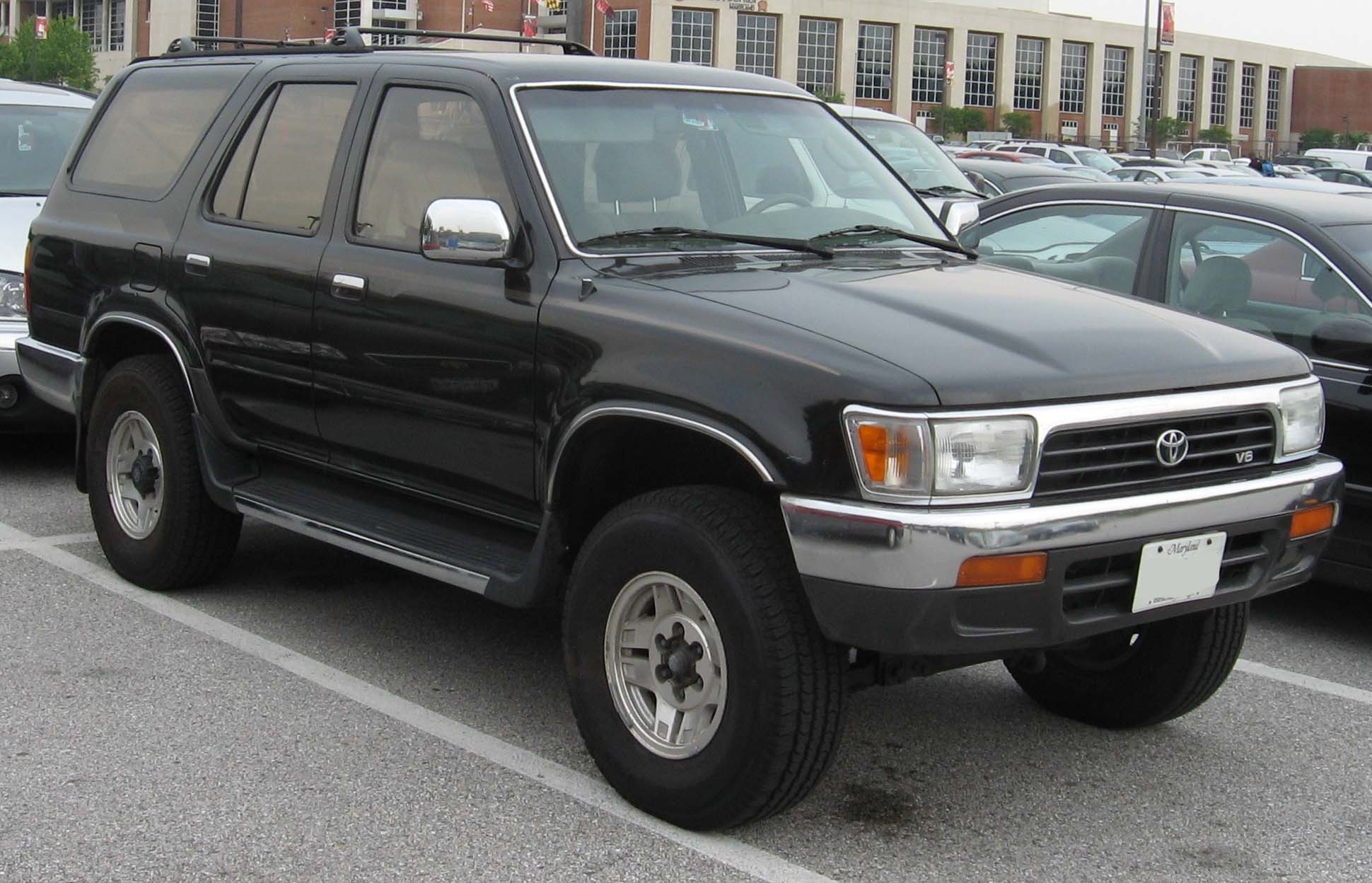
1992–1995 Toyota 4Runner (US; facelift)

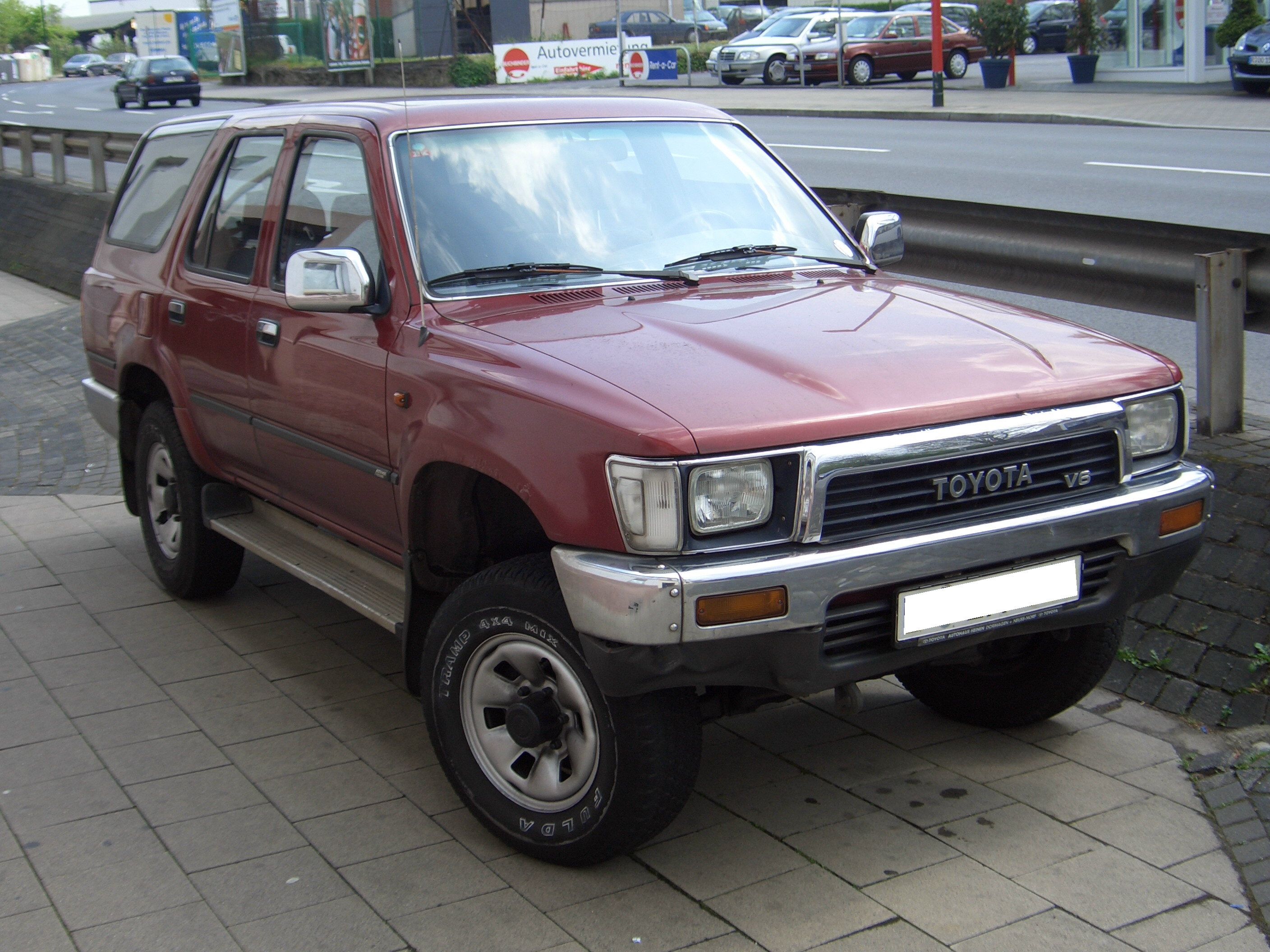
1990–1992 Toyota 4Runner (Germany; pre-facelift)

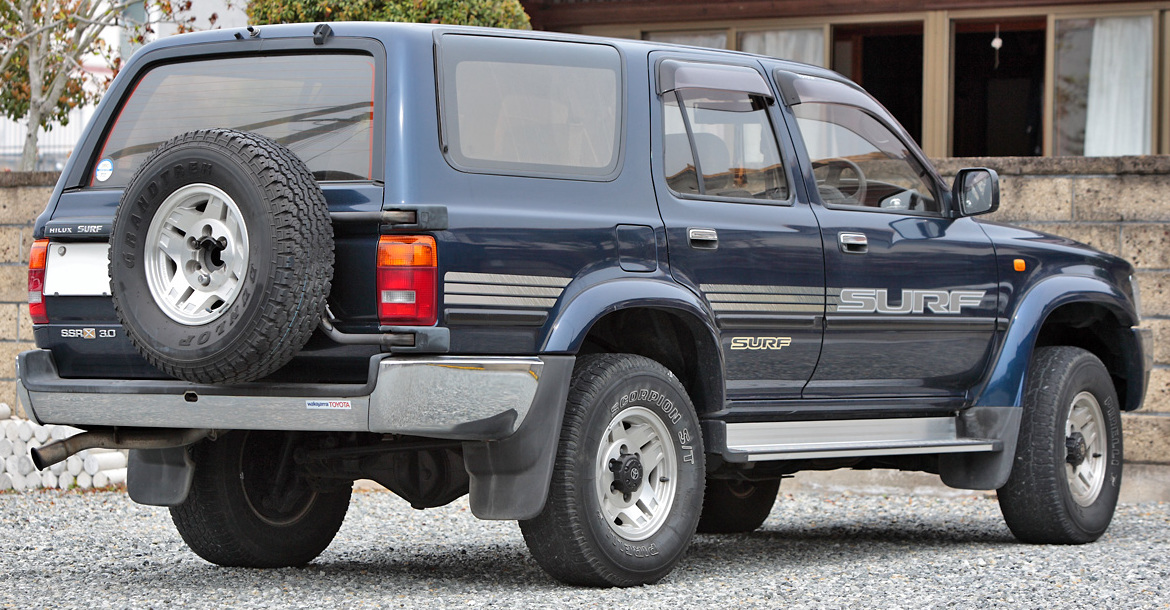
1992–1995 Toyota Hilux Surf (KZN130G; Japan)

Nearly all second generation 4Runners were four-door models; however, two-door models also were produced from launch in 1989 to May 1993. These models are similar to the four-door models of the time in that the bodies were formed as a single unit, instead of the fiberglass tops used in the first generation 4Runners. Two-door cars of the second generation are extremely rare, and they were priced higher than the four-door model due to the chicken tax applied to light-duty imported trucks. US sales of the two-door body ended in August 1992, but it continued to be available in the Canadian market through 1993, and Japan until May 1993.

Most competing full-body SUVs produced at the time (e.g. Nissan Pathfinder, Ford Explorer) featured tailgates that opened upward with the glass closed. In contrast, the second generation 4Runner carried over the retractable-glass tailgate from the first generation. Opening these tailgates requires first retracting the rear window into the tailgate and then lowering the tailgate much like as on a pickup truck.

In 1991 for the 1992 model year, the 4Runner received minor cosmetic updates, including one-piece front bumpers and modular headlamps instead of the increasingly outdated rectangular sealed beams, as well as a differently styled interior with a new pattern on the seats and door cards and a different horn button. This facelift distanced the 4Runner somewhat from the Hilux pickups which did not receive the same cosmetic changes. At this time a wide-body version was introduced featuring extended wheel arch flares along with wider wheels and tires. The Hilux Surf also had as options a Recaro interior, TEMS shocks with a NORMAL and HARD setting, a limited slip differential, front bullbars and a swing-out spare tire mounted on the tailgate.

Additional cosmetic changes occurred between 1993 and 1995, the last year of the second generation.

=== Mechanical ===
1990–1995 Toyota 4Runner LSD (LN130; Bulgaria)

Because the drive train was still developed from the same source, the available engines and drivetrains were identical to the corresponding Hilux. The new 4Runner used the independent front suspension that had been developed on the previous generation. The older style gear driven transfer case was phased out on the V6 models and they now had a chain driven case. The older gear driven case was retained on the 4-cylinder models. There was also a choice of an open differential, or in Japan and Europe, a limited slip unit similar to the one found in the A70 Toyota Supra, parts are also interchangeable.

In the United States, the 4Runner carried over the same engine options from the previous generation: the 22R-E 2.4 L I4 and 3VZ-E 3.0 L V6. With the V6 and four-speed automatic transmission, the US EPA rated the 4Runner at 15 mpg_{‑US} (16 L/100 km; 18 mpg_{‑imp}) on the city driving cycle; in testing, 14.28 mpg_{‑US} (16.47 L/100 km; 17.15 mpg_{‑imp}) was observed.

The Hilux Surf version for the Japanese market was also available with a range of diesel engines, including a 2.4 L turbodiesel 2L-TE I4 up to 1993, followed by a 3.0 L turbodiesel 1KZ-TE I4. Small numbers were also made with a normally aspirated 2.8 L diesel 3L I4, a 2.0 L 3Y I4 naturally aspirated gasoline engine, and 2.4 L 22R-E I4 gasoline engine. The majority of gasoline versions of the Hilux Surf received the 3VZ-E 3.0 L V6. Various trim levels were offered in Japan ranging from the base model 'SSR' through 'SSR Ltd', 'SSR-V' 'SSR-X' and 'SSR-X Ltd' to the range topping 'SSR-G'.

Hilux Surf/4Runner (N130) drivetrain options
Drivetrain Trim		2.0 L 3Y-EU (Note: Discontinued August 1991)		2.4 L 2L-TE (Note: Discontinued August 1993)		2.4 L 22R-E		2.8 L 3L	3.0 L 3VZ-E (Note: Introduced August 1990)		3.0 L 1KZ-TE (Note: Introduced August 1993)	
Drivetrain Trim		5MT	4AT	5MT	4AT	5MT	4AT	5MT	5MT	4AT	5MT	4AT
SR (JDM)	5dr 4WD	No	No	No	No	No	No	Yes	No	No	—N/a	
SSR (JDM)	3dr 4WD	Maybe	Maybe (Note: Discontinued August 1990)	Yes	Maybe	?	?	No	No	No	—N/a	
SSR (JDM)	5dr 4WD	Maybe	No	Yes	Maybe	?	?	No	No	No	Yes	Yes
SSR-V (Note: SSR-V introduced with wide body in August 1993) (JDM)	5dr 4WD	—N/a		—N/a		?	?	No	Yes	Yes	Yes	Yes
SSR-X (Note: SSR-X introduced with standard and wide body options in August 1991) (JDM)	3dr 4WD	No	No	Yes	Yes	?	?	No	Yes	Yes	—N/a	
SSR-X (JDM)	5dr 4WD	No	No	Yes	Yes	?	?	No	Yes	Yes	Yes	Yes
SSR Limited (JDM)	3dr 4WD	Yes	Yes	Yes	Maybe	?	?	No	Yes	Yes	—N/a	
SSR Limited (JDM)	5dr 4WD	Yes	Yes	Yes	Yes	?	?	No	Yes	Yes	—N/a	
SSR-G (Note: SSR-G replaces SSR Limited starting August 1991) (JDM)	3dr 4WD	No	No	No	No	?	?	No	Yes	Yes	—N/a	
SSR-G (JDM)	5dr 4WD	No	No	No	No	?	?	No	Yes	Yes	Yes	Yes
SR5 (USDM)	3dr 4WD (Note: Discontinued starting with the 1993 model year)	—N/a		—N/a		Yes	No	—N/a	Yes	Yes	—N/a	
SR5 (USDM)	5dr RWD	—N/a		—N/a		No	No	—N/a	No	Yes	—N/a	
SR5 (USDM)	5dr 4WD	—N/a		—N/a		Yes	No	—N/a	Yes	Yes	—N/a	
Max. output	Power	97 PS (96 hp; 71 kW) at 4800 rpm		94 PS (93 hp; 69 kW) at 4000 rpm		118 PS; 87 kW (116 hp) at 4800 rpm		91 PS (90 hp; 67 kW) at 4000 rpm	152 PS; 112 kW (150 hp) at 4800 rpm		130 PS (128 hp; 96 kW) at 3600 rpm	
Max. output	Torque	16.3 kg⋅m (118 lb⋅ft; 160 N⋅m) at 3800 rpm		22.0 kg⋅m (159 lb⋅ft; 216 N⋅m) at 2400 rpm		19 kg⋅m; 190 N⋅m (140 lb⋅ft) at 2800 rpm		19.2 kg⋅m (139 lb⋅ft; 188 N⋅m) at 2400 rpm	25 kg⋅m; 244 N⋅m (180 lb⋅ft) at 3400 rpm		29.5 kg⋅m (213 lb⋅ft; 289 N⋅m) at 2000 rpm	

N130 drivetrain notes

=== Safety ===
The first and second generation 4Runners were both targeted as unsafe SUVs. 1980s and early-1990s crash regulations in the United States were not very strict for light trucks, and all early model 4Runners were fitted with doors that offered little protection in the event of a side collision. In most areas, there was little more than two pieces of sheet-metal and the window to keep incoming vehicles from impacting passengers. Later, more strict crash regulations mandated doors that offered as much protection as passenger doors. In the United States, the 1994 and 1995 model years added side-impact beams in the doors.

The crash test rating for the second generation 4Runner was one to two stars (out of five) for the driver's side in a frontal collision, while the passenger side received a three to four-star rating.

The rear wheels were equipped with an anti-lock braking system as standard equipment for the SR5 V6 starting from the 1990 model year and four-wheel anti-lock brakes were an option.

== Third generation (N180; 1995) ==
Third generation
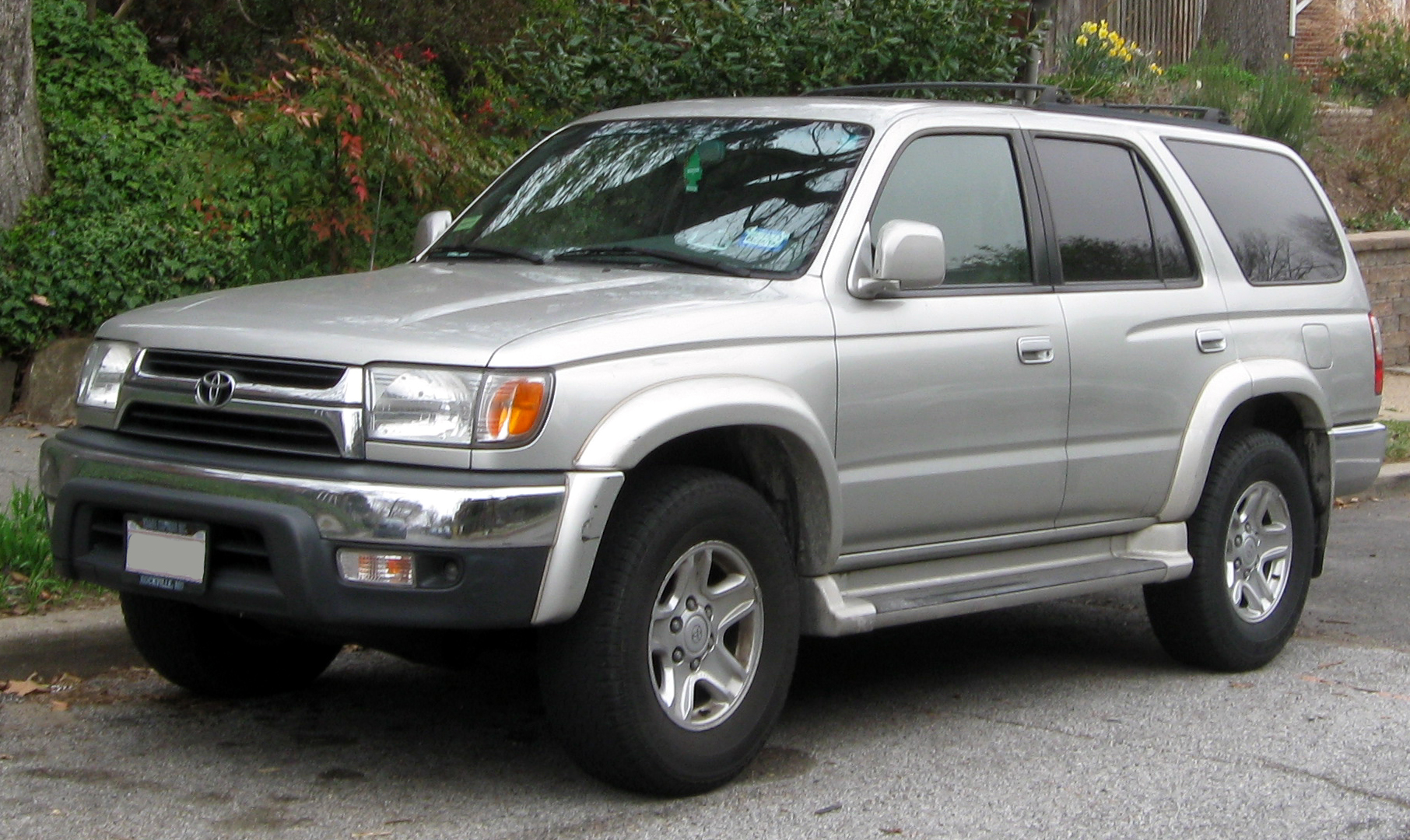
- 2001-2002 Toyota 4Runner

Overview
- Model code: N180
- Also called: Toyota Hilux Surf (Japan); Toyota Hilux SW4 (Argentina and Brazil); Zhongxing Admiral
- Production: August 1995 – August 2002
- Model years: 1996–2002 (US)
- Assembly: Japan: Tahara, Aichi; Hamura, Tokyo (Hino)

Body and chassis
- Class: Mid-size SUV
- Body style: 5-door SUV
- Related: Toyota Land Cruiser Prado (J90); Toyota Tacoma (N140/N150/N160/N170/N190); Toyota Hilux (N140/N150/N160/N170); Toyota Hilux Sport Rider

Powertrain
- Engine: Gasoline: 2.7 L 3RZ-FE I4 (RZN180/185; Japan from 1995 to 2002, North America from 1995 to 2000); 3.4 L 5VZ-FE V6 (VZN180/185; 1995–2002); Diesel: 3.0 L 1KZ-TE turbo I4 (KZN185; Japan, 1995–2000); 3.0 L 1KD-FTV D-4D turbo I4 (KDN185; Japan, 2000–2002)
- Transmission: 5-speed manual; 4-speed A340F automatic

Dimensions
- Wheelbase: 2,675 mm (105.3 in)
- Length: 4,540–4,850 mm (178.7–190.9 in)
- Width: 1,690–1,800 mm (66.5–70.9 in)
- Height: 1,750–1,805 mm (68.9–71.1 in)
- Curb weight: 1,640–1,770 kg (3,616–3,902 lb)

Developed under chief engineer Masaaki Ishiko from 1990 to 1995 under the project code 185T, in late 1995 (for the 1996 model year) a significant redesign of the 4Runner was introduced, with an all-new body shell on an all-new chassis. It shared many parts, including engine and transmission, with the new Tacoma, and shared its chassis with the Land Cruiser Prado. Despite moving upmarket with the rest of the mid-size SUV market, the new 4Runner differentiated itself by retaining the rugged off-road character its competitors were sacrificing for highway comfort.

=== Design ===
The third generation 4Runner featured new engines shared with the first generation Toyota Tacoma pickup trucks:

- 2.7L 3RZ-FE I4 replacing the previous 2.4 L 22R-E I4
  - 150 hp (112 kW) max horsepower at 4800 rpm, an increase of 38 hp (28 kW)
  - 177 lb⋅ft (240 N⋅m) max torque at 4000 rpm, an increase of 35 lb⋅ft (47 N⋅m)
- 3.4L 5VZ-FE V6 replacing the previous 3.0L 3VZ-E V6
  - 183 hp (136 kW) horsepower at 4800 rpm, an increase of 33 hp (25 kW)
  - 217 lb⋅ft (294 N⋅m) max torque at 3600 rpm, an increase of 37 lb⋅ft (50 N⋅m)

In the United States, the 4Runner was available in three trims; the V6 engine was limited to the two higher trims (SR5 and Limited). For 4WD models, the transfer case selector allows the driver to select between 2WD high range (H2), 4WD low range (L4), or 4WD high range (H4); Limited models use a pushbutton to select H4.

Toyota 4Runner trim and drivetrain combinations
Drivetrain Trim		2.7L 3RZ-FE I4		3.4L 5VZ-FE V6	
Drivetrain Trim		5-sp MT	4-sp AT	5-sp MT	4-sp AT
Standard	2WD	Yes	Yes	No	No
Standard	4WD	Yes	Yes	No	No
SR5	2WD	No	No	No	Yes
SR5	4WD	No	No	Yes	Yes
Limited	2WD	No	No	No	Yes
Limited	4WD	No	No	No	Yes

Airbags for both the driver and passenger were added with the introduction of the third-generation 4Runner in 1995 for the 1996 model year. The new 4Runner was also available with a factory installed selectable electric locker in the rear differential, a first for the 4Runner but available since 1993 in the Toyota Land Cruiser.

Other significant changes from the second generation models include a larger body on a 2.3 in (58 mm) longer wheelbase and 1 in (25 mm) wider track, increased interior space, increased cargo space, dual airbags, ABS, lift-up tailgate, coil-spring suspension all around, rack and pinion steering, and aerodynamic contour designed glass headlights. Ground clearance decreased by 1/2 inch (13 mm) to 8.5 inches (220 mm). Maximum towing capacity with the optional V6 increased from 3,500 to 5,000 lb (1,590 to 2,270 kg).

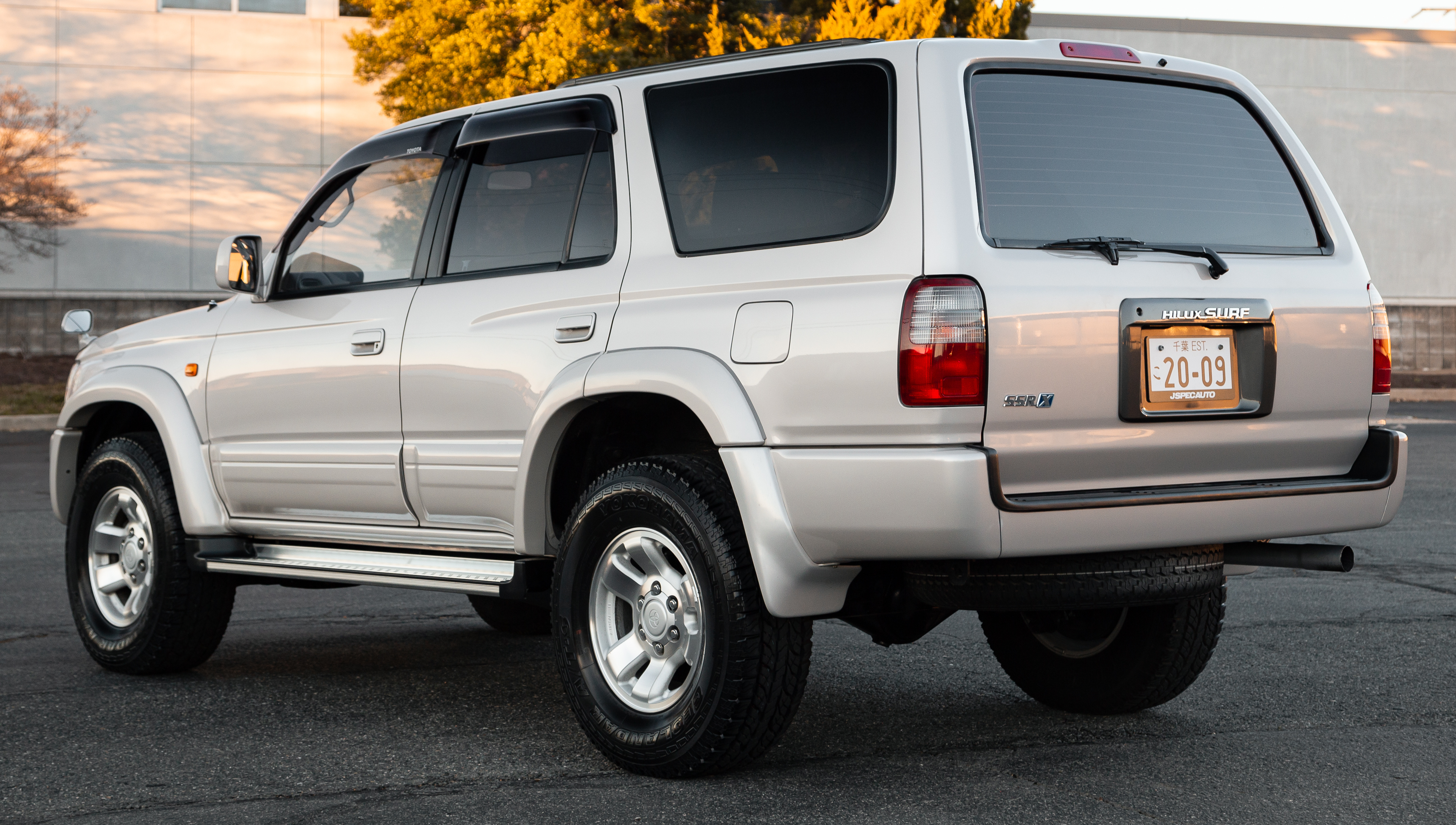
1997 Toyota Hilux Surf SSR-X (KZN185)

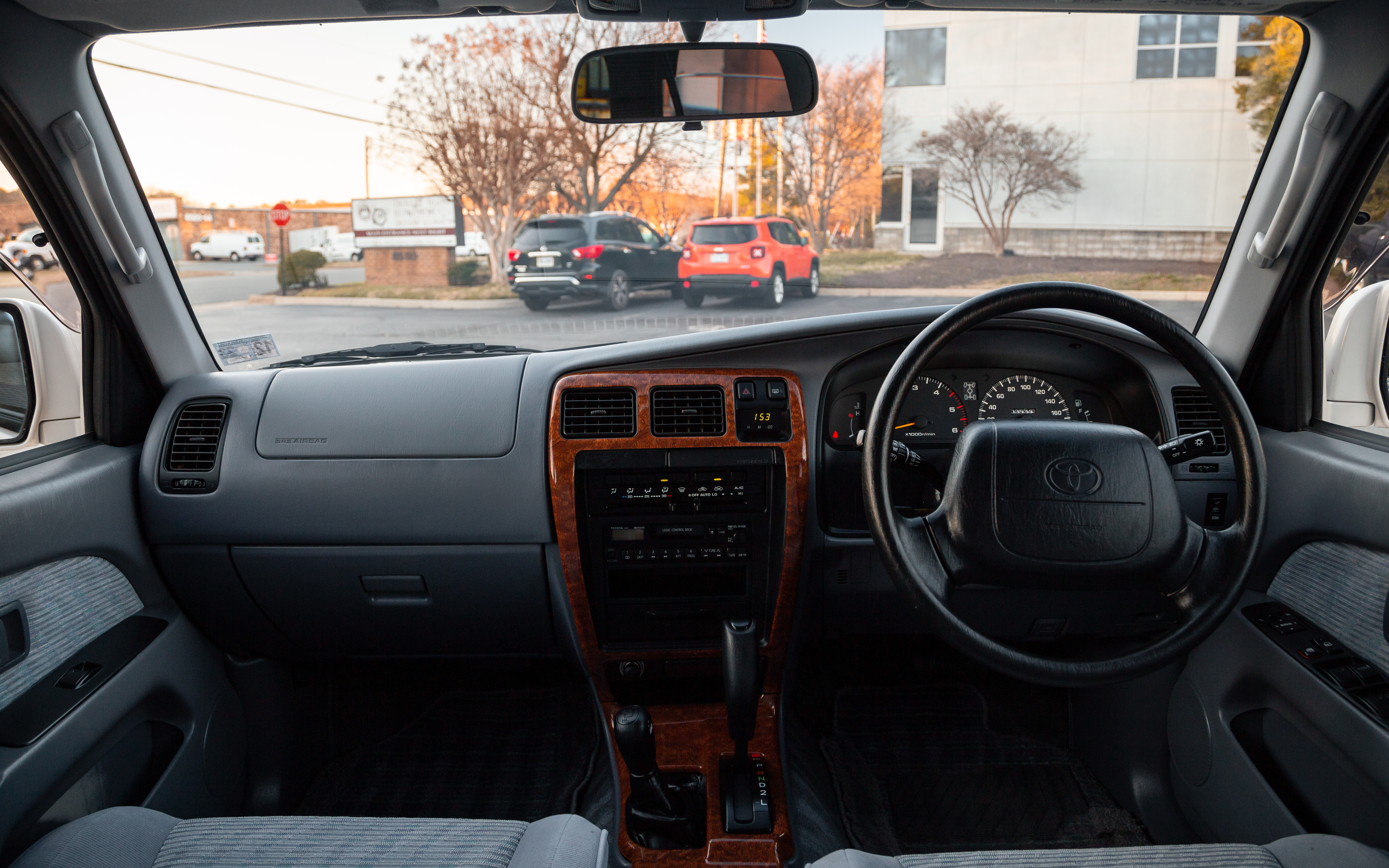
Interior

The equivalent Hilux Surf for the Japanese market was sold initially in four distinct trims, each of which used part-time four-wheel drive: SSR (standard body), SSR-X (standard body with luxury equipment), SSR-V (wide body), and SSR-G (wide body with luxury equipment). The 3.4L V6 was available only with the 4-speed automatic on the SSR-G trim. Additionally, Hilux Surf versions immediately moved to 16-inch wheels and gained a center differential, enabling the use of four-wheel drive on hard surfaces without complication for the first time. The prior system was retained to give on-the-fly shifting between rear- and four-wheel drive as before.

For Japan, in addition to the two gasoline engines, the Hilux Surf also was available with a 3.0-liter 1KZ-TE turbodiesel engine with a maximum output of 130 hp (97 kW). This turbodiesel was available with either the 5-speed manual or 4-speed automatic.

In 1996, the 4Runner was dropped from sale in the UK, to be replaced by the Toyota Land Cruiser Prado, which was badged as the Toyota Land Cruiser Colorado.

=== Model year changes ===
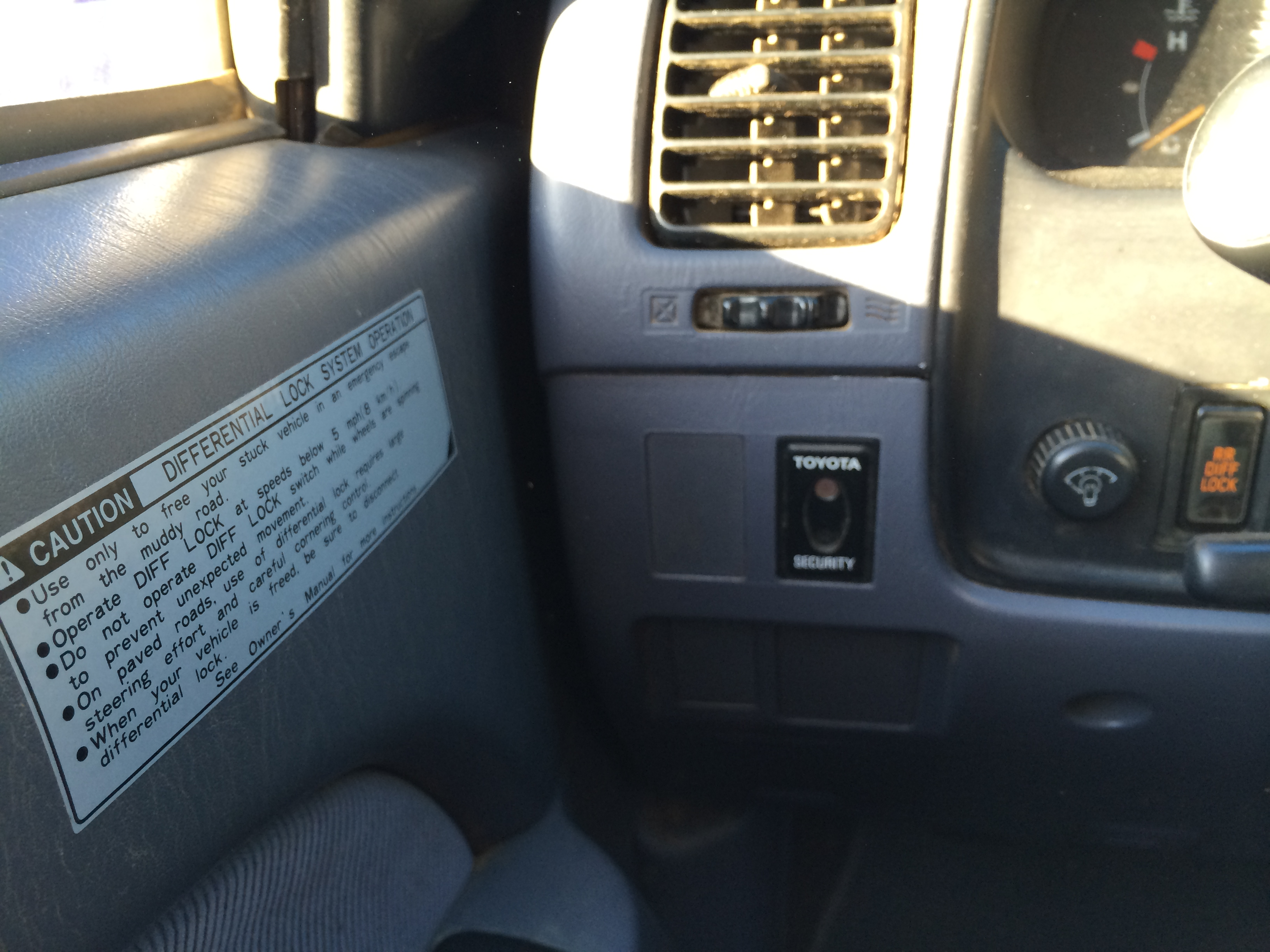
Original placard describing the operation of the Toyota rear electronic locker in a 1997 Toyota 4Runner

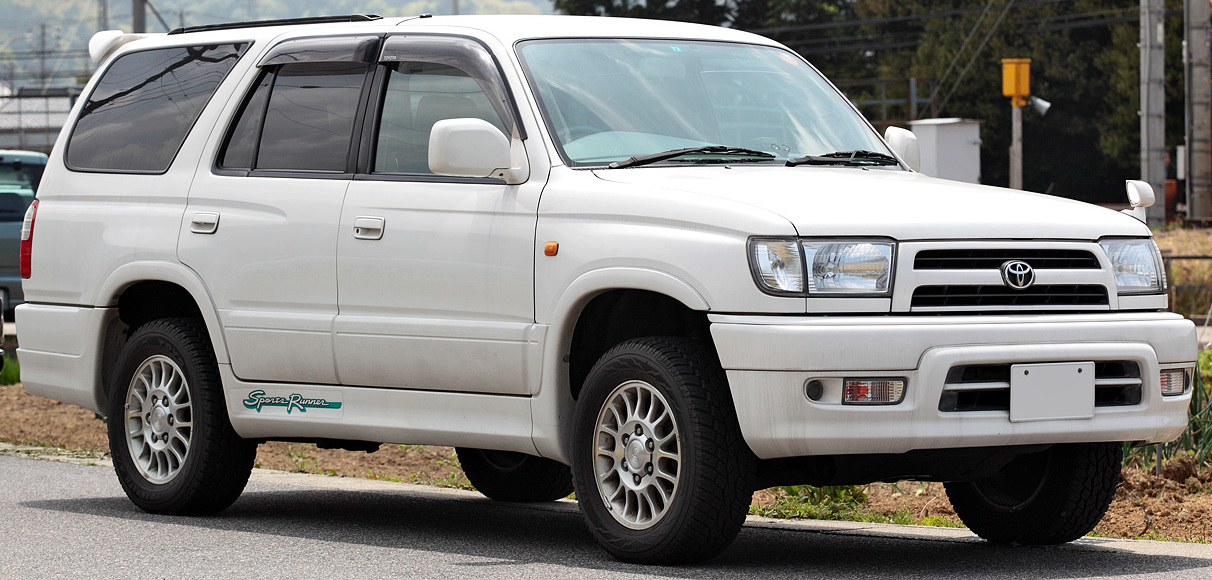

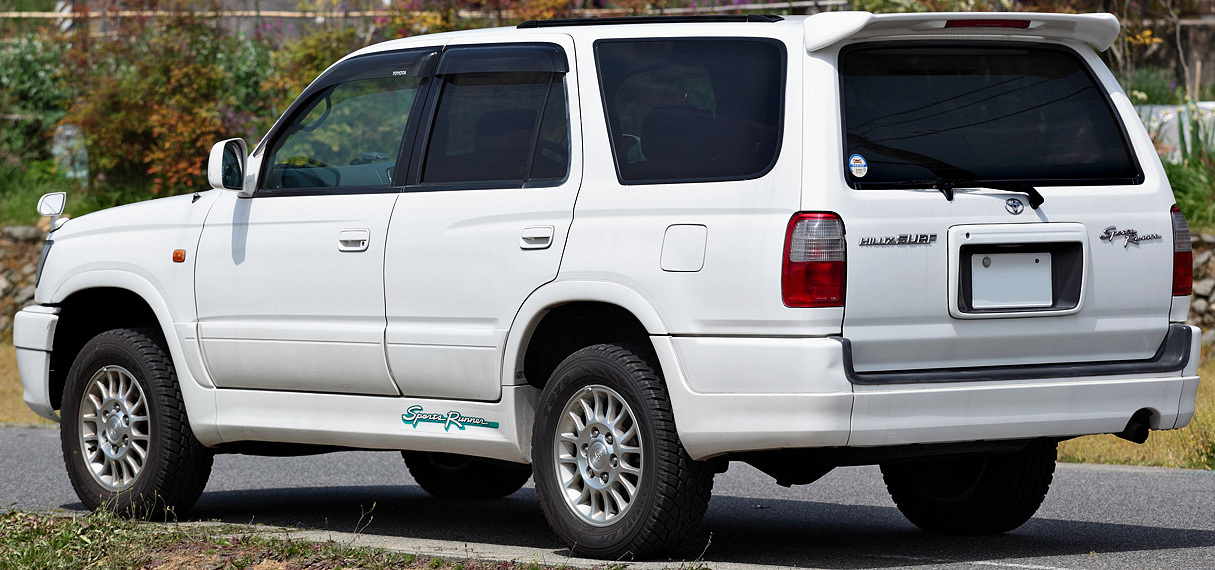
1998–2000 Toyota Hilux Surf Sports Runner (Japan)

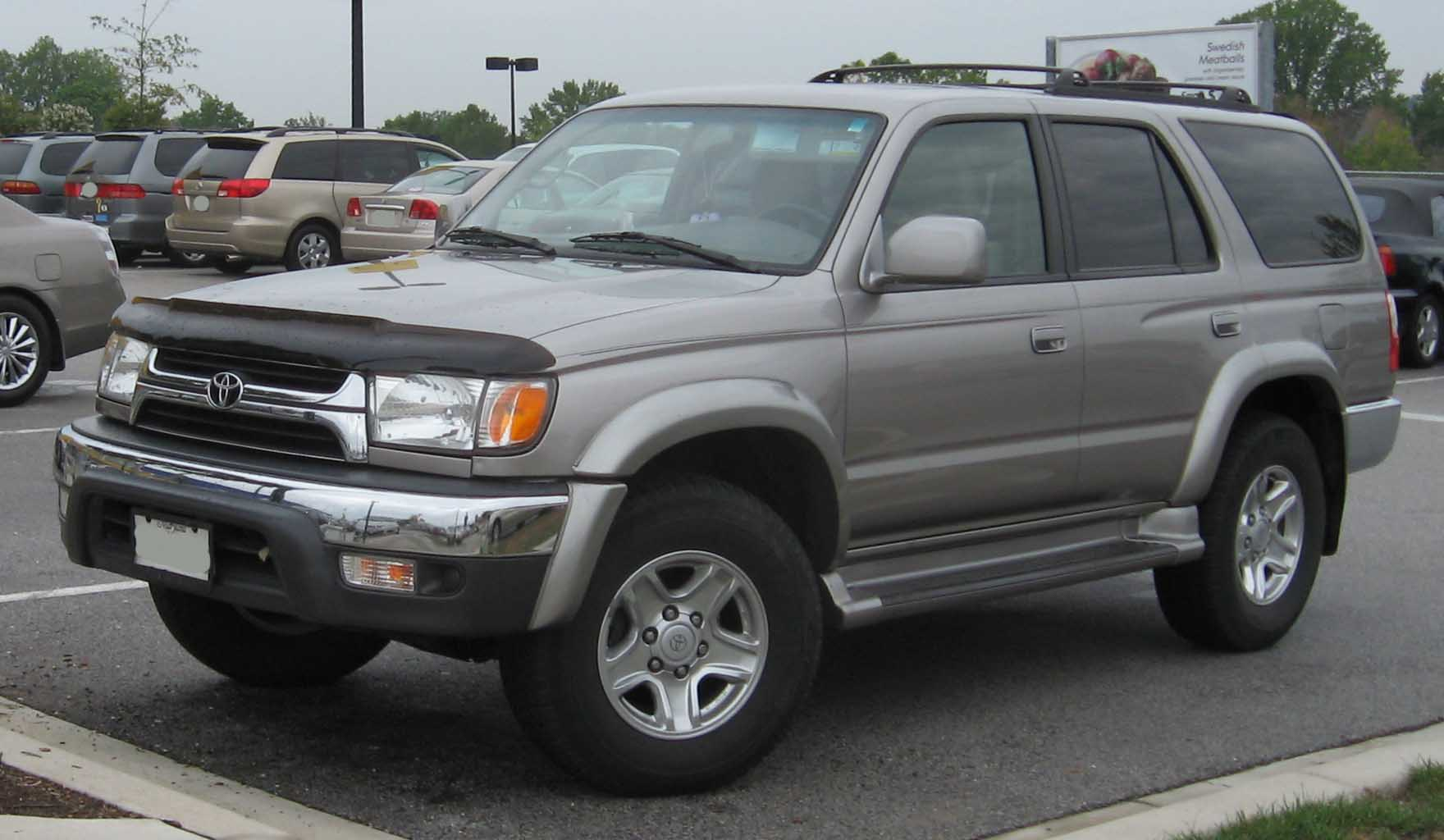
2001–2002 Toyota 4Runner (USA)

In 1996, for the 1997 model year, the 4Runner received a few minor updates, including the addition of a color keyed cargo cover. In Japan, an intercooled version of the 1KZ-TE turbodiesel was introduced in July 1996, increasing maximum output to 140 hp (100 kW), with availability limited to the Hilux Surf SSR-G only.

In 1997, for the 1998 model year, the 4Runner remained largely unchanged, save for a few changes in the electronics. More ergonomic switch control panels and a newly designed 4 spoke steering wheel, which also necessitated a redesign of the airbag system. The Hilux Surf introduced a new 'Sports Runner' trim line in August 1998, which was available with either the 2.7L I4 or 3.4L V6 gasoline engines; the 'Sports Runner' was rear-wheel drive only.

In 1998, for the 1999 model year, there were both major cosmetic and interior enhancements. A new "fat lip" bumper was designed to allow for an extended crush zone on the front of the frame, as well as new multi-parabola style headlights, projector style fog lamps, and updated side marker lights and front turn signals. Vehicles with "Limited" and "Highlander" (later called "Sport Edition") trim received color-keyed running boards, front and rear bumpers, mud flaps and flares. The ergonomics of the interior was completely changed, moving all the controls to the center of the dash for the rear window, and defrost, it also received a new instrument panel with a digital odometer. Additional standard equipment for 1999 included an electrically heated side-view mirror that operates in conjunction with the rear defrost. The Limited trucks also received a brand-new electronic temperature control, and upgraded stereo. The "multi-mode" transfer case system became available as an option for 4WD 4Runners for 1999, giving the option of AWD operation.

In 1999, for the 2000 model year, the 5-speed manual option was dropped, leaving the 4-speed automatic as the sole transmission option. This would mark the last time any 4Runner would be offered with a manual transmission. Interior updates included driver and passenger headrests featuring forward and backward tilt adjustment, further enhancing safety and passenger comfort. The turbodiesel engine for the equivalent Hilux Surf (sold July 2000 to December 2001) was replaced by the 3.0L 1KD-FTV, which offered an increased maximum output of 170 hp (130 kW) using a common rail direct injection design.

In 2000, for the 2001 model year, the 4-cylinder option was discontinued in North America. It also received new transparent tail lights and new front grille design. The wheels were changed to a five-spoke design rim. Limited models received newly designed five spoke wheels as well, however different from SR5 and base model. Also included was a new, sleeker side view mirror design. SR5 and base model 4Runners also have redesigned climate control units utilizing 3 knobs and 2 buttons, contrary to the 1999 model's 2 sliders and 2 knobs. 2001 models were equipped with Vehicle Stability Control standard, and 4WD models came standard with the "multi-mode" transfer case. The optional "e-locker" locking rear differential was dropped for 2001. This was replaced by the new advanced traction control system that offered similar performance by applying the individual brakes to direct power to whichever tires needed the most traction.

In 2001, for the 2002 model year, chromed lift gate exterior trim that encompasses the license plate was added.

== Fourth generation (N210; 2002) ==
Fourth generation
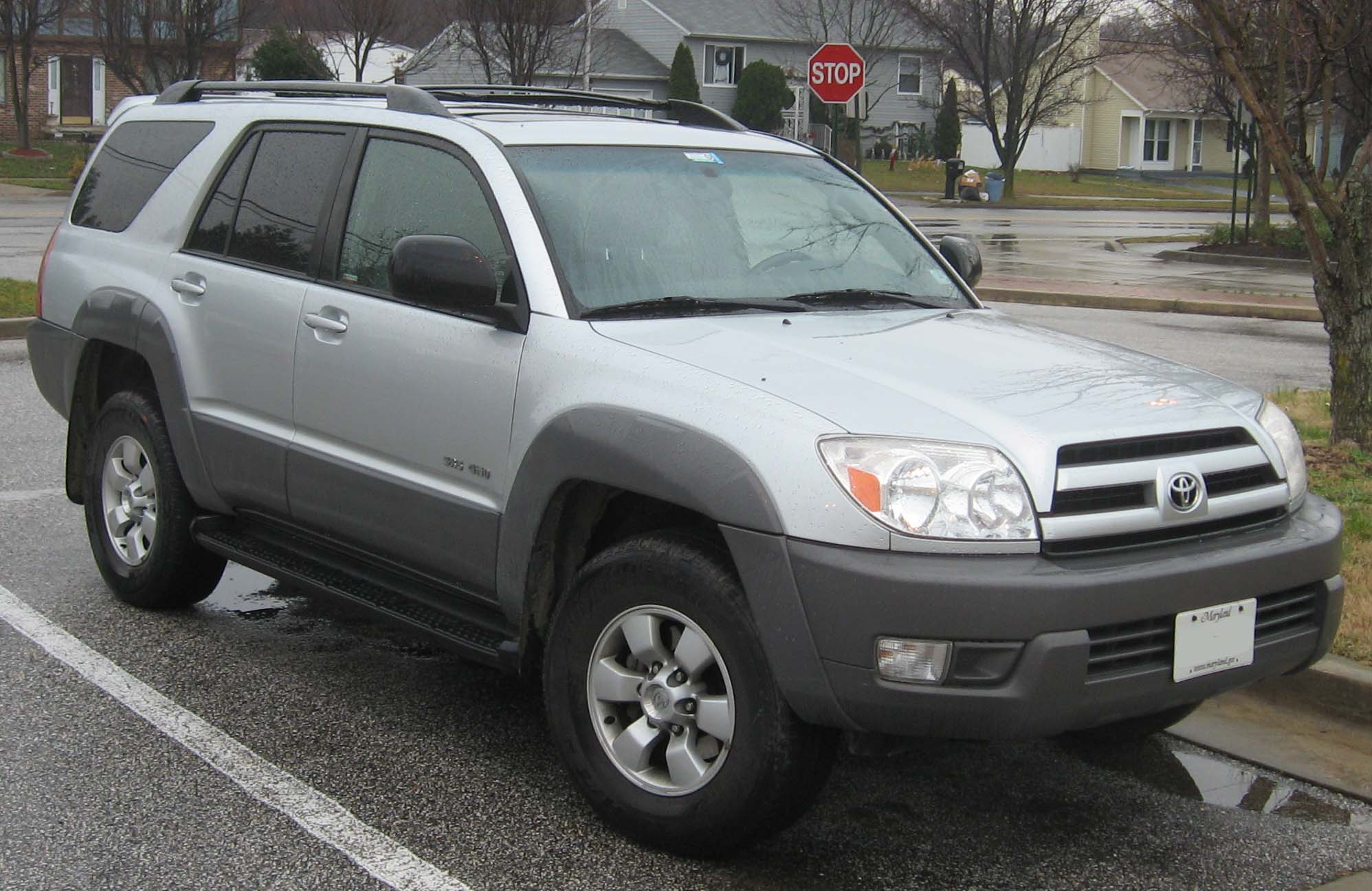
- Pre-facelift 4Runner SR5

Overview
- Model code: N210
- Also called: Toyota Hilux Surf (Japan)
- Production: August 2002 – August 2009; November 2002 - September 2009 (Hilux Surf)
- Model years: 2003–2009 (US)
- Assembly: Japan: Tahara, Aichi; Hamura, Tokyo (Hino)

Body and chassis
- Class: Mid-size SUV
- Body style: 5-door SUV
- Platform: Toyota F2
- Related: Toyota Land Cruiser Prado/Lexus GX 470 (J120); Toyota FJ Cruiser; Toyota Tacoma (N220/N240/N250/N260/N270)

Powertrain
- Engine: Gasoline: 2.7 L 3RZ-FE I4 (RZN210/215; Japan, 2002–2004); 2.7 L 2TR-FE I4 (TRN210/215; Japan, 2004–2009); 3.4 L 5VZ-FE V6 (VZN210/215; Japan, 2002–2005); 4.0 L 1GR-FE V6 (GRN210/215; North America from 2002 to 2009, Japan from 2005 to 2009); 4.7 L 2UZ-FE V8 (UZN210/215; North America, 2002–2009); Diesel: 3.0 L 1KD-FTV D-4D turbo I4 (KDN215; Japan, 2002–2005)
- Transmission: 4-speed A3xx automatic; 5-speed A7xx automatic

Dimensions
- Wheelbase: 2,789 mm (109.8 in)
- Length: 4,800.6–4,805.7 mm (189–189.2 in)
- Width: 1,874.5–1,910.1 mm (73.8–75.2 in)
- Height: 1,750.1–1,818.6 mm (68.9–71.6 in)
- Curb weight: 1,941 kg (4,280 lb)

The fourth-generation 4Runner incorporated serious changes to the chassis and body of the vehicle, but was targeted at approximately the same demographics as the third generation. Based on the Land Cruiser Prado 120 series, the new 4Runner retained the same basic exterior styling themes, and was still marketed as a mid-size semi-luxury SUV with off-road capabilities. An all-new LEV certified 4.0 L 1GR-FE V6 which produces 245 hp (183 kW) and 282 lb⋅ft (382 N⋅m) of torque is standard, but for the first time, a V8 became available, the ULEV certified 4.7 L 2UZ-FE engine which in the US produced 235 hp (175 kW) and 320 lb⋅ft (434 N⋅m). In 2004, for the 2005 model year, the addition of VVT-i increased output to 268 hp (200 kW) and 315 lb⋅ft (427 N⋅m). Fuel economy is estimated at 17 mpg city, 20 mpg highway for the V6 and 15/19 mpg for the V8. Towing capacity is 5,000 lb (2,268 kg) on V6 models and 7,300 lb (3,311 kg) on RWD V8 models (7000 pounds w/4WD). The 4Runner first entered dealer showrooms in October 2002 for the 2003 model year. Three trim levels were offered, SR5, Sport Edition, and Limited. When it was first introduced the SR5 and Sport Edition models used gray plastic cladding and bumpers. The Limited trim featured body color painted cladding and bumper shrouds. Sport models also featured a non-functional hood scoop.

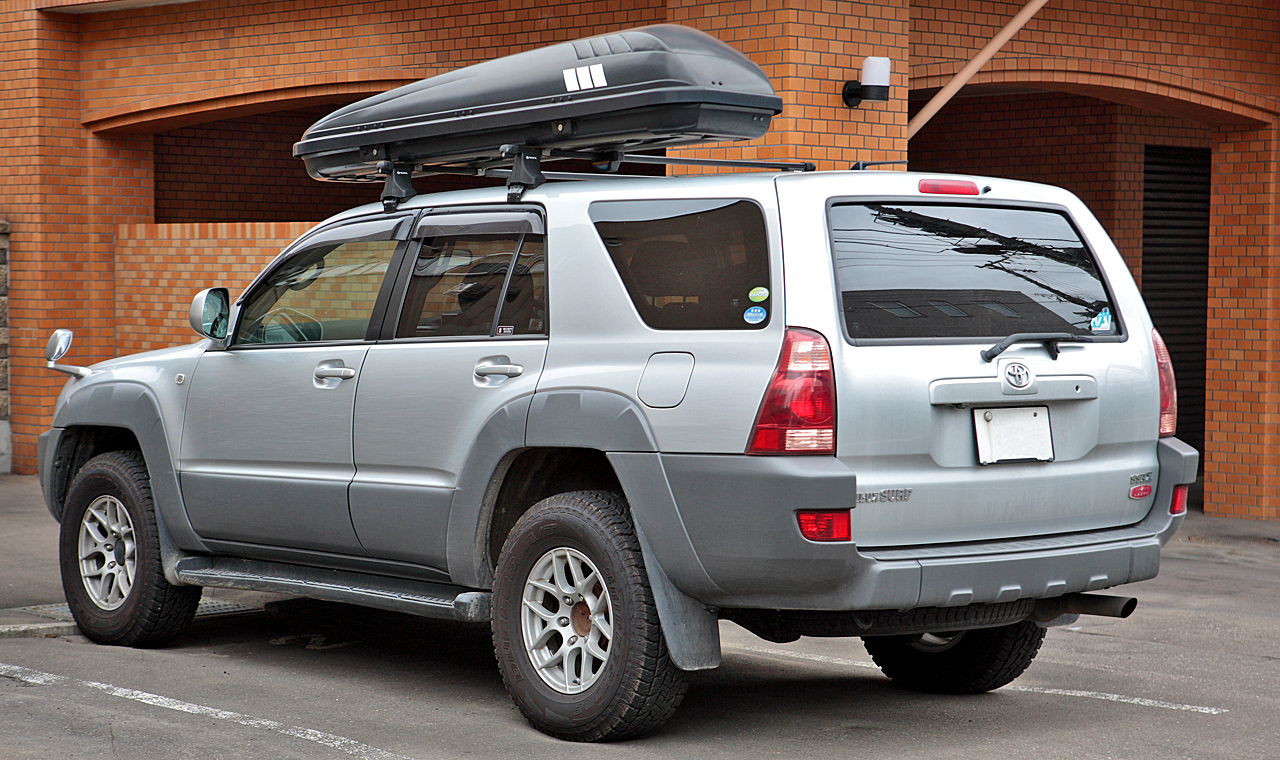
Toyota Hilux Surf SSR-X

With front double wishbone suspension, the 4Runner continued to use a body on frame construction design and a solid rear axle for strength and durability, compromising interior room and on-road handling. Toyota's other mid-size SUV, the Highlander is a crossover that is not designed for off-roading. The optional 4WD systems were full-time on V8 models while "Multi-Mode" or part-time on V6 models. Both systems used a lockable Torsen center differential. A new suspension system, X-Relative Absorber System (X-REAS), became standard on the Sport Edition and optional for SR5 and Limited models, a rear auto-leveling height adjustable air suspension is sometimes included with this option on Limited models. The X-REAS system links the dampers diagonally by means of hydraulic hoses and fluid using a mechanical center valve to reduce body roll during hard cornering. All 4Runners were equipped with plastic skid plates for the engine, transfer case, and fuel tank to prevent damage during off-roading. The Hill-Start Assist Control (HAC) system prevents the 4Runner from rolling backwards on inclines and a Downhill Assist Control (DAC, 4WD only) modulates the brakes and throttle automatically without driver inputs for smooth hill descents at very low speeds, both electronic aids are standard on 4WD models.

Major standard features included a tilt and telescoping steering wheel, remote keyless entry, single zone automatic climate control, power driver's lumbar support, power rear tailgate window, and on V8 models a tow hitch receiver bolted directly to the rear frame crossmember. Options included HomeLink, an electrochromic auto-dimming rearview mirror, power moonroof, third row seating, a DVD-based navigation system (loses in-dash CD changer), a 10-speaker JBL Synthesis stereo, and rear seat audio. An optional backup camera system on Limited models used two cameras mounted on the interior D-pillars to give a wider view when backing up. Some trim levels get two mirrors mounted on the interior D-pillars just inside the rear hatch.

In 2009 with the end of this generation, Toyota Japan ceased production of the Hilux Surf, leaving only the 4Runner available in the subsequent model series.

=== Safety ===
All 4Runners came with Toyota's Star Safety System which includes anti-lock brakes, electronic brakeforce distribution, brake assist, traction control and Vehicle Stability Control. Side torso airbags for the front rows as well as side curtain airbags for the front and rear rows were optional on 2003–2007 models and became standard on 2008 models.

The Insurance Institute for Highway Safety rated the 4Runner as "Good" overall in the frontal offset crash test, "Good" overall in the side impact test on vehicles with side airbags, and the 4Runner received a "Poor" rating for rear impact protection. An IIHS report published in April 2007 shows the 4Runner has one of the lowest death rates for all vehicles on the road at only 13 deaths per million registered vehicle years for the 2003 and 2004 model years. Only the Chevrolet Astro, Infiniti G35, and BMW 7 series had lower death rates.

US NHTSA crash test ratings (2003 model year):
Frontal Driver:	4/5 stars
Frontal Passenger:	4/5 stars
Side Driver:	5/5 stars
Side Rear Passenger:	5/5 stars
Rollover:	3/5 stars

=== Yearly changes ===
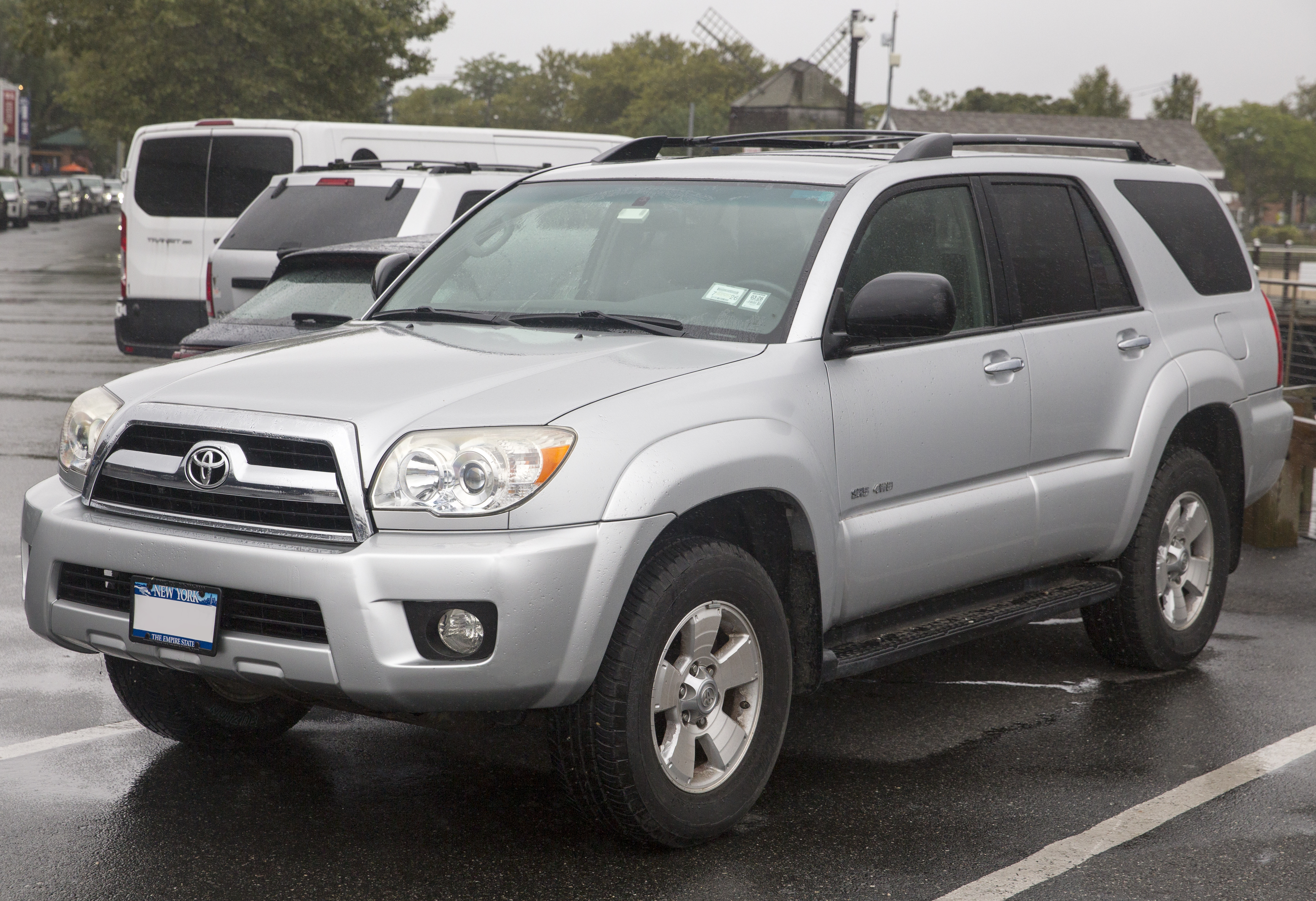
Facelifted 4Runner SR5 4WD (US)

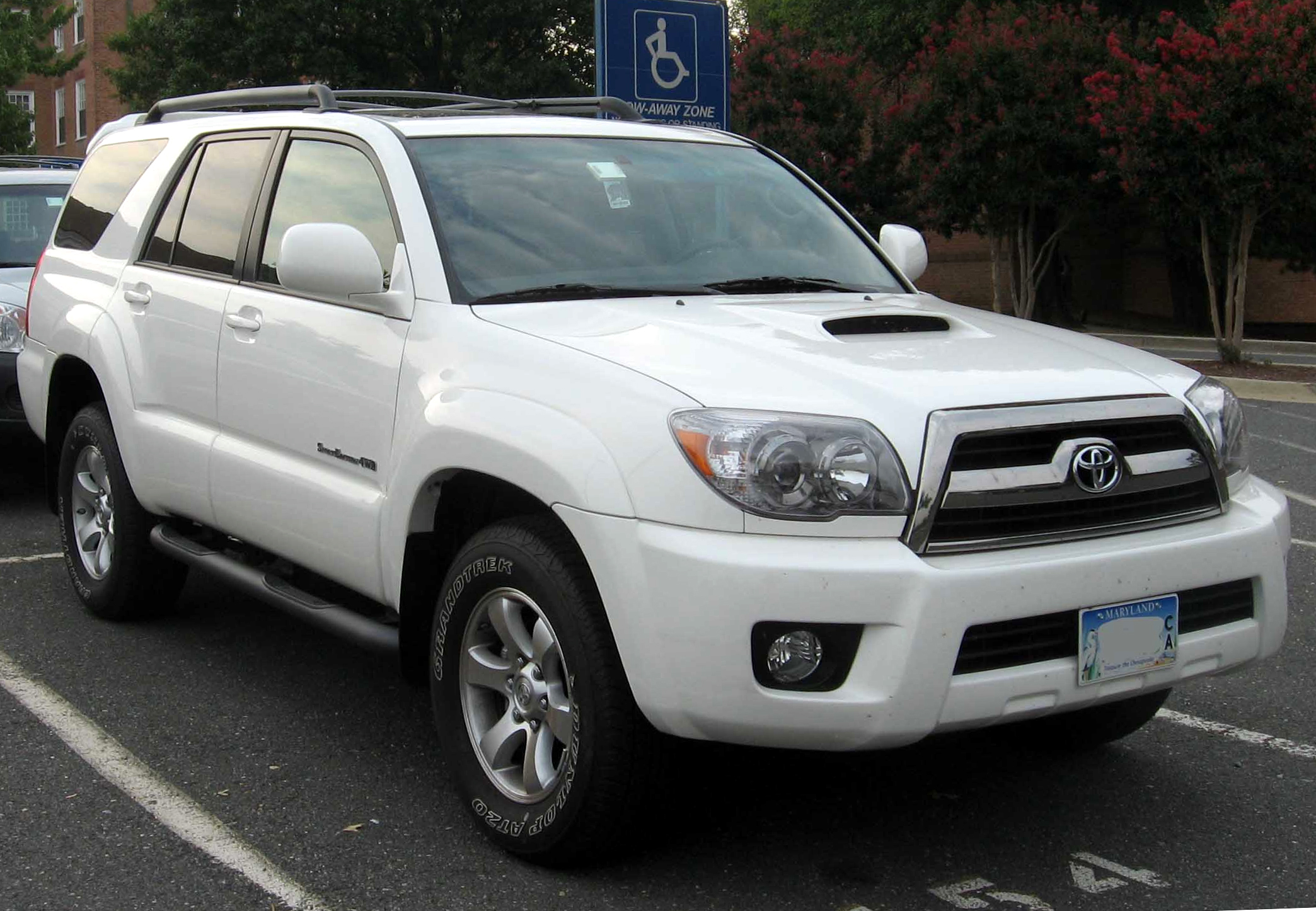
Facelifted 4Runner Sport Edition 4WD (US)

- In early 2003, Toyota added an optional Appearance Package for the SR5 model that included color-keyed cladding, bumpers, and liftgate trim. In April 2003, Toyota made the Appearance Package, along with the previously optional fog lamps, running boards, and 16-inch aluminum wheels, standard on the SR5. The Sport Edition also added black running boards and color-keyed trim, replacing the grey cladding and silver-painted grille, door handles and liftgate trim.
- In late 2003 (for the 2004 model year), a tire-pressure monitoring system was added as standard equipment. A third row seat became optional on the SR5 and Limited models.
- In 2004 (for the 2005 model year), enhancements were brought to the optional V8 engine and a 5-speed automatic was made standard on the V6 model. Slight changes were made to the exterior including color-keyed bumper trim (replacing the silver painted trim on all colors except Dorado Gold) on the SR5 and Limited; a chrome grille on the SR5; a black roof-rack and running boards (replacing silver) on the Limited; and a redesigned rear spoiler. A Salsa Red Pearl scheme was also introduced for all trim levels, although a similar color scheme was available for third generation models.
- 2005 (for the 2006 model year) marked the fourth generation's mid-cycle refresh. The changes included revised front and rear bumpers; a reworked grille; new projector-beam headlamps and LED tail lamps; additional chrome trim on the SR5 model; and a smoked-chrome grille with tubular roof-rack and step bars on the Sport Edition. The revised front bumper features circular fog lights and a relocation of the turn-signals to the headlamp assembly. The redesigned bumper eliminates the rear bumper reflectors. MP3 playback capability and an auxiliary input jack were added to all audio systems. In addition, the Limited model was further differentiated from the other trim levels with the addition of unique 18" wheels and a seat memory system. Shadow Mica was added as a color option. Late in this period, the 1GR-FE V6 engine received a modification to allow for an improved head gasket design which resolved a common head gasket failure.
- In 2006 (for the 2007 model year), the 4Runner remained unchanged.
- In 2007 (for the 2008 model year), the 4Runner received standard rollover sensing side curtain airbags and front row side torso airbags, a switch to disable Vehicle Stability Control, slightly modified front grille design, refinements in the tire-pressure monitoring system, and some changes in the seat belt warning system and brake system control. An Urban Runner Package was also available on the Sport Edition V6 4x4, which added an in dash Tom Tom navigation system, Alcantara inserts in both the front and back seats with dark leather bolstering, the 18" Limited style wheels, a color-keyed front grille and a double-decker cargo system.
- In 2008 (for the 2009 model year), the 4Runner remained unchanged. A Trail Edition package offered an electronic locking rear differential, a switch to enable/disable Advanced Traction Control (A-TRAC) and Bilstein dampers.
- Later models offered a DVD Rear Seat Entertainment System (RSES) which used a nine-inch LCD screen and two wireless headphones.

== Fifth generation (N280; 2009) ==
Fifth generation
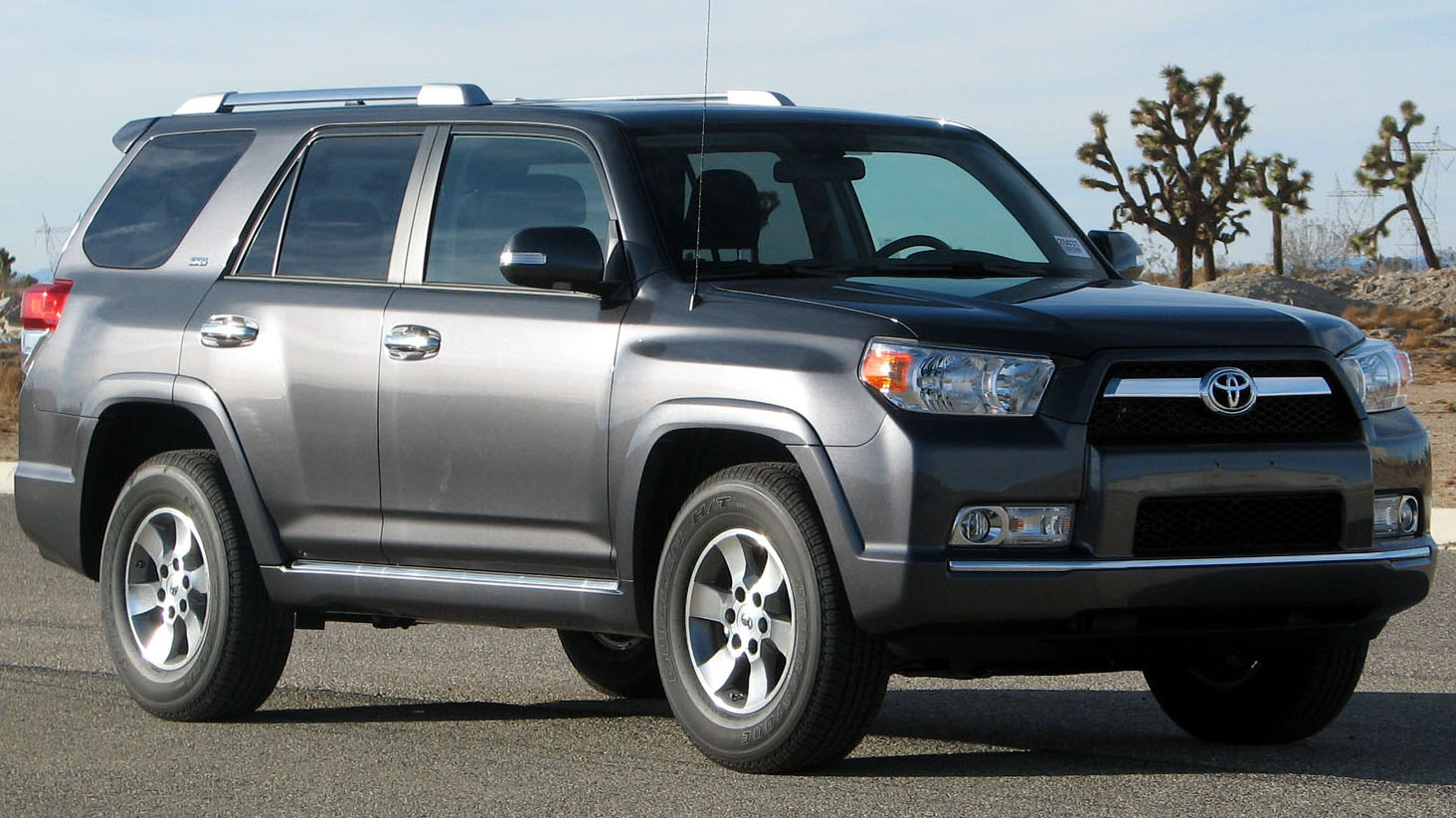

Overview
- Model code: N280
- Production: August 2009 – August 2024
- Model years: 2010–2024 (US)
- Assembly: Japan: Tahara, Aichi (Tahara plant)
- Designer: Ken Iwasaki and Tom Matsumoto; Eishi Suzuki (2014 facelift)

Body and chassis
- Class: Mid-size SUV
- Body style: 5-door SUV
- Platform: Toyota F2
- Related: Toyota Land Cruiser Prado/Lexus GX (J150); Toyota FJ Cruiser; Toyota Tacoma (N300)

Powertrain
- Engine: Gasoline: 2.7 L 2TR-FE I4 (TRN280; 2009–2010); 4.0 L 1GR-FE V6 (GRN280/285; 2009–2024)
- Transmission: 4-speed automatic (2.7 L); 5-speed automatic (4.0 L)

Dimensions
- Wheelbase: 2,790 mm (109.8 in)
- Length: 4,825–4,860 mm (189.9–191.3 in)
- Width: 1,925 mm (75.8 in)
- Height: 1,795 mm (70.7 in)
- Curb weight: 1,995–2,180 kg (4,400–4,805 lb)

The fifth-generation 4Runner was unveiled at the State Fair of Texas on 24 September 2009, and went on sale months later. It is built on the same platform as the J150 series Land Cruiser Prado/Lexus GX and the FJ Cruiser. Despite being built in Japan, it was only produced in left-hand drive and it was not sold there or any other RHD markets.

Initially, the 4Runner was available in three trim levels, two of which were available previously. The base SR5 trim as well as the top-of-the-line Limited trim are available as a 2WD or a 4WD. The Trail Edition is only available as a 4WD. The SR5 and Trail Edition 4WDs received a part-time 4WD drive system, while the Limited has full-time 4WD. All models came with Active Traction Control (A-TRAC). The new Trail Edition offers Toyota's Kinetic Dynamic Suspension System (KDSS) and Crawl Control which had previously only been available to premium Toyota vehicles, as well as a rear locking differential like the previous Trail Package.

The 4.0-liter V6 gasoline engine adds Dual VVT-i which improves horsepower, torque and fuel economy, and comes standard in all models. A 2.7-liter I4 was available on 2WD models, but was discontinued after the 2010 model year. The 4.7-liter V8 from the previous generation was not carried over to the fifth generation 4Runner.

=== Model year changes ===
In 2013 (for the 2014 model year), the 4Runner received a facelift, consisting of revised front and rear fascia with projector headlamps and clear-lensed, LED tail-lamps, as well as other minor exterior cosmetic changes. The interior was also updated, with soft-touch door trim, leather-wrapped steering wheel and shift knob, revised dashboard and center stack, and the inclusion of Toyota's Optitron instrument cluster as standard across all trim levels. Brake lines were upgraded for improved pedal feel, and electronic Trailer Sway Control programming included. No driveline changes were made. All 2014 model year 4Runner models are powered by a 4.0-liter V-6 engine with intelligent Variable Valve Timing (VVT-i) that produces 201 kW (270 bhp) and 377 N⋅m (278 ft⋅lb) of torque. It is mated to a five-speed automatic ECT transmission.

In 2014 (for the 2015 model year), the TRD Pro trim level was introduced in the United States, with Toyota badging on the front as well as an off-road package as part of the TRD Pro Series. The TRD Pro 4Runner included TRD Bilstein shocks with remote reservoirs, TRD-tuned front springs and TRD front skid plate. For each model year of the TRD Pro, beyond the two colors available on all trims, the TRD Pro is available in an exclusive color. This was 'Inferno Orange' for the 2015 model year, 'Quicksand' for 2016, 'Cement' for 2017, 'Cavalry Blue' for 2018, 'Voodoo Blue' for 2019, 'Army Green' for 2020, 'Lunar Rock' for 2021, 'Lime Rush' for 2022, 'Solar Octane' for 2023, and 'Terra' for 2024. All United States models received the Entune touchscreen infotainment system with a 6.1-inch display and a rear backup camera as standard equipment, with optional GPS navigation, SiriusXM Satellite Radio, HD Radio, and Safety Connect. Only the Limited trim featured a standard JBL premium amplified audio system.

In 2016 (for the 2017 model year), the 4Runner Trail and Trail Premium were renamed to TRD Off-Road and TRD Off-Road Premium in the United States. These trim levels shared the same mechanical functionality of the former Trail edition, but added aesthetic differences and TRD badging to differentiate themselves from the base model. They did not share the same suspension as the TRD Pro model.

In 2018 (for the 2019 model year), Toyota began offering a Nightshade package based on the Limited trim which blacks out badging, lower front and rear fascia, wheels, and portions of the interior.

In 2019 (for the 2020 model year), Toyota announced that all 4Runner trims would receive Toyota Safety Sense-P (TSS-P) standard as well as two additional rear seat USB ports. The TRD Pro was to have an updated grille design to accommodate the front radar sensor for TSS-P. All United States models received an updated Entune 3.0 infotainment system with a larger, higher-resolution touchscreen display, Apple CarPlay and Android Auto smartphone integration and Amazon Alexa integration, 4G LTE internet access powered by Verizon Wireless, Safety Connect, and standard SiriusXM Satellite Radio and optional HD Radio. The TRD Pro model received a JBL premium amplified audio system as standard equipment. The system was previously only available on Limited models, where it remained standard equipment. Most models also featured standard GPS navigation.

In 2021 (for the 2022 model year), Toyota included their smart key system with push button as standard for all trims. The new TRD Sport trim was also added into the lineup. The TRD Sport received the same bumper, 20" wheels and the X-REAS suspension from the Limited. It also includes TRD parts such as the TRD shifter, TRD hood with scoop, TRD badges, and Softex seats with TRD lettering. Unlike the Limited, it is available only with 2WD or part-time 4WD. Toyota added LED foglights, lowbeams and highbeam headlights as standard for all trims for the first time. Blind spot monitor and rear cross traffic alert were added as standard for most trims. The TRD Pro now gets standard multi-terrain monitor. Using strategically placed cameras, the system lets the driver check surroundings on the trail, with the ability to spot potential obstacles not easily seen from the cabin. The Limited trim adds a standard Panoramic View Monitor, which is similar to the multi-terrain monitor on the TRD Pro. The Limited grade and TRD models also add a premium Multi-Information Display. All trims receives rear occupancy alert as standard. Lime Rush is the new exclusive paint for the 2022 model year TRD Pro.

In 2022 (for the 2023 model year), the 40th Anniversary Special Edition is a limited model for the North American market producing 4,040 units, with three exterior colors, and standard four-wheel-drive. Solar Octane paint is exclusive to the 2023 model year TRD Pro. Additionally, a heated steering wheel was introduced as standard equipment on the TRD Pro, 40th Anniversary Special Edition, TRD Off-Road Premium, and as optional equipment on the SR5, the SR5 Premium, the TRD Off-Road, and the Limited (with leather only). The heated steering wheel is not an available option on the TRD Sport.

In 2023 (for the 2024 model year), Terra paint (an orange-brown color) is the exclusive color for TRD Pro while Solar Octane carries over to TRD Sport and Off Road Premium trims only.

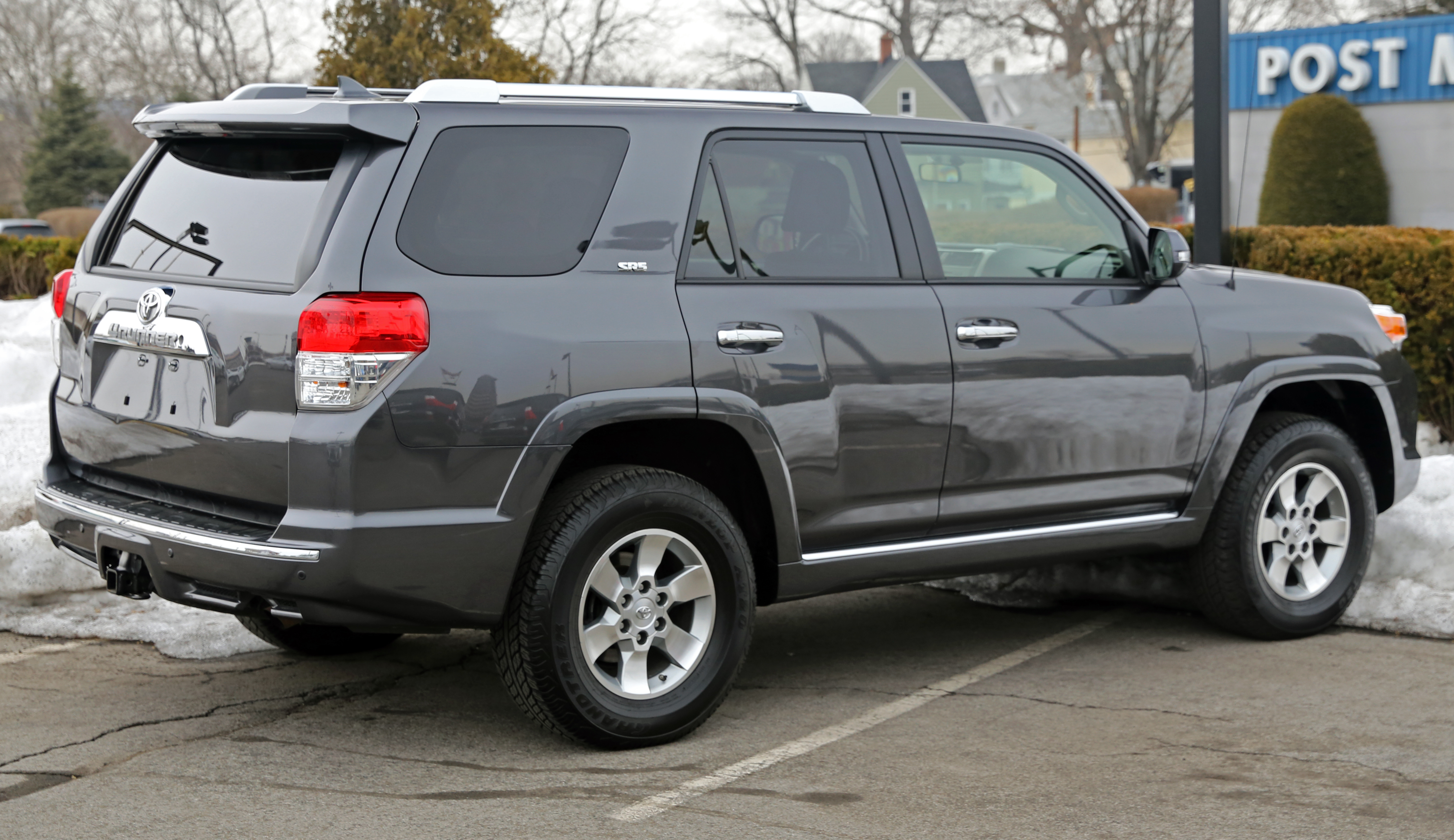
Toyota 4Runner SR5, rear view

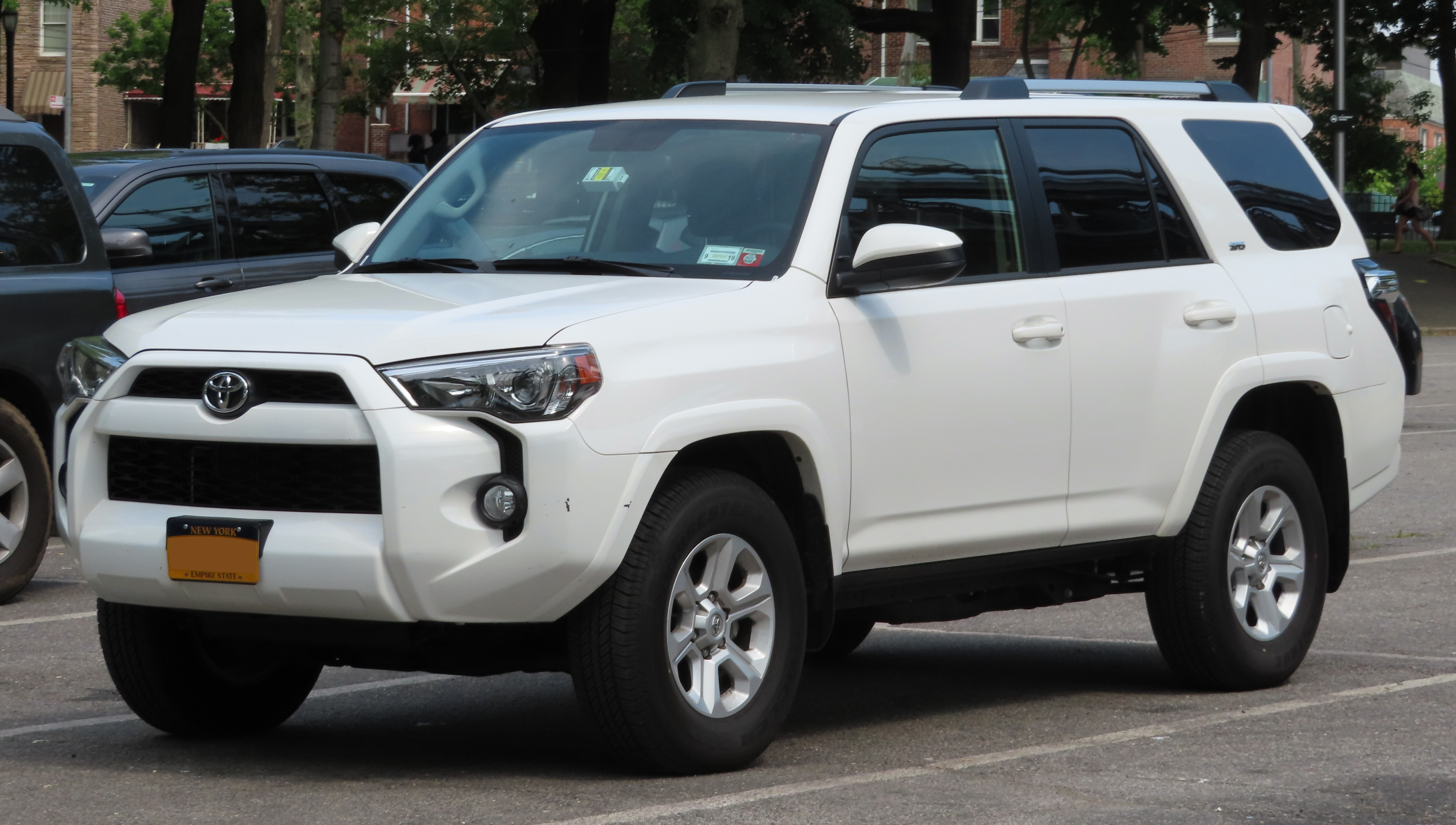
(Facelift) 2019 4Runner SR5 (GRN280L)

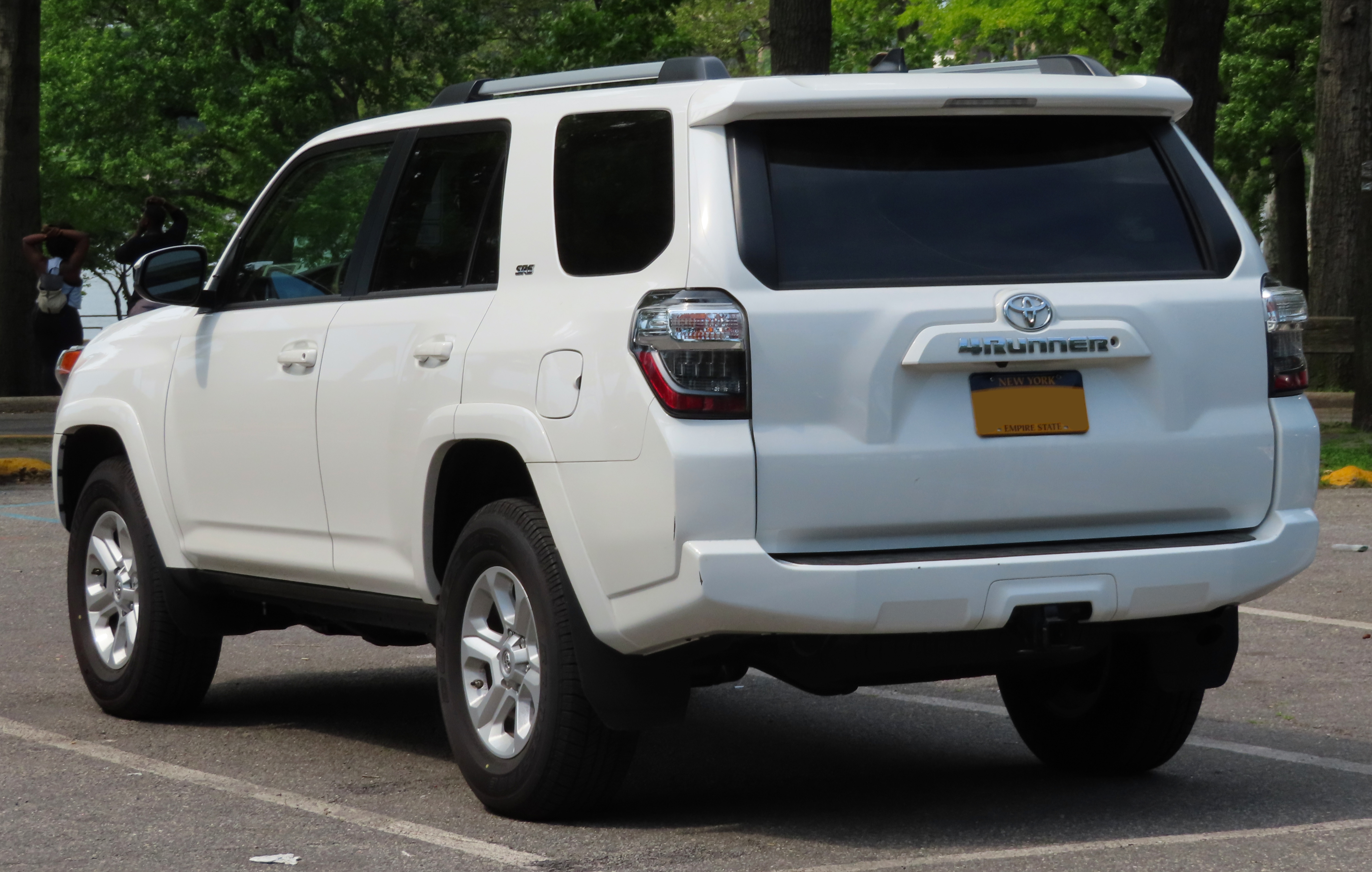
(Facelift) 2019 4Runner SR5 (GRN280L)

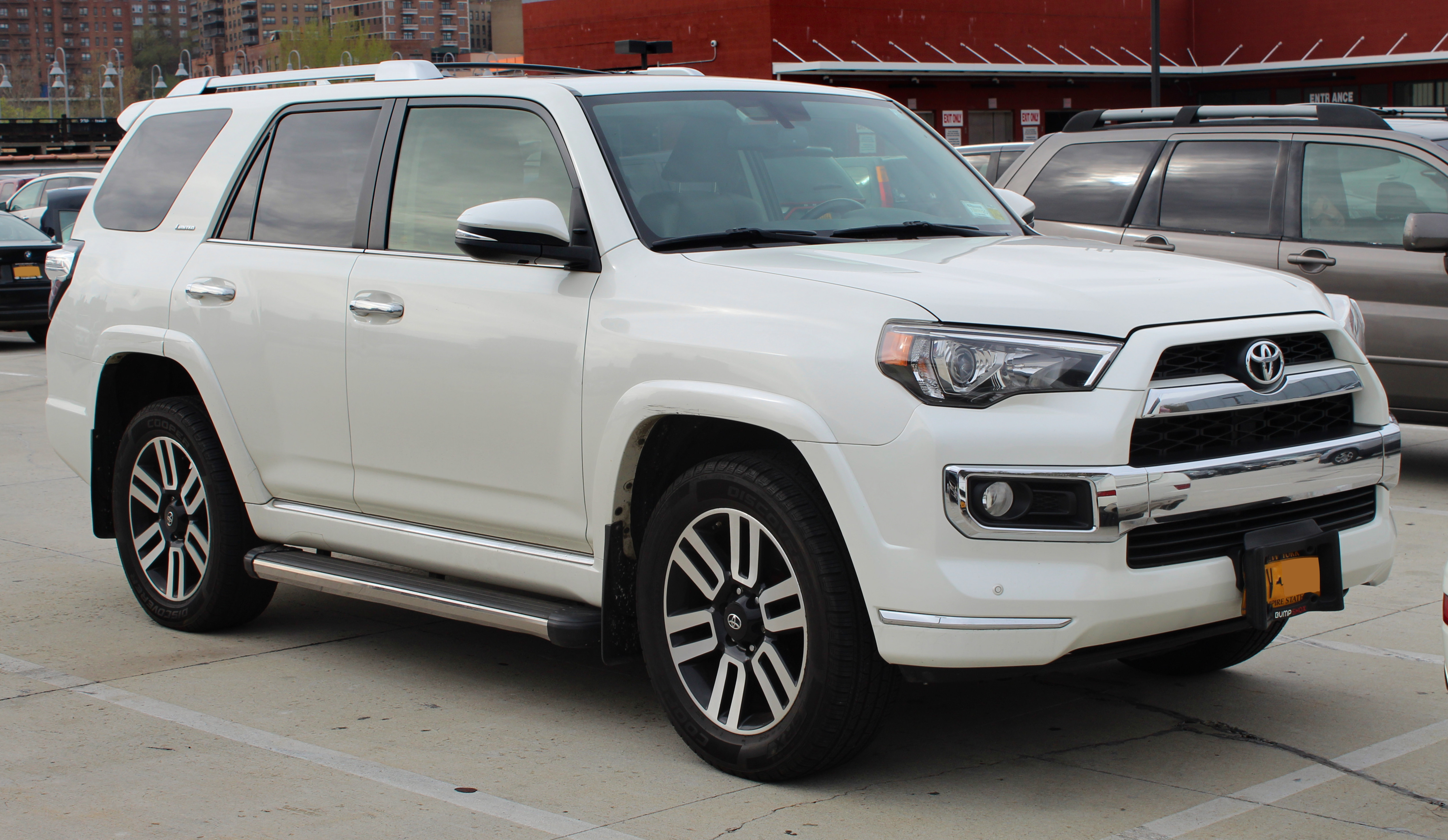
(Facelift) 2014 4Runner Limited (GRN280L)

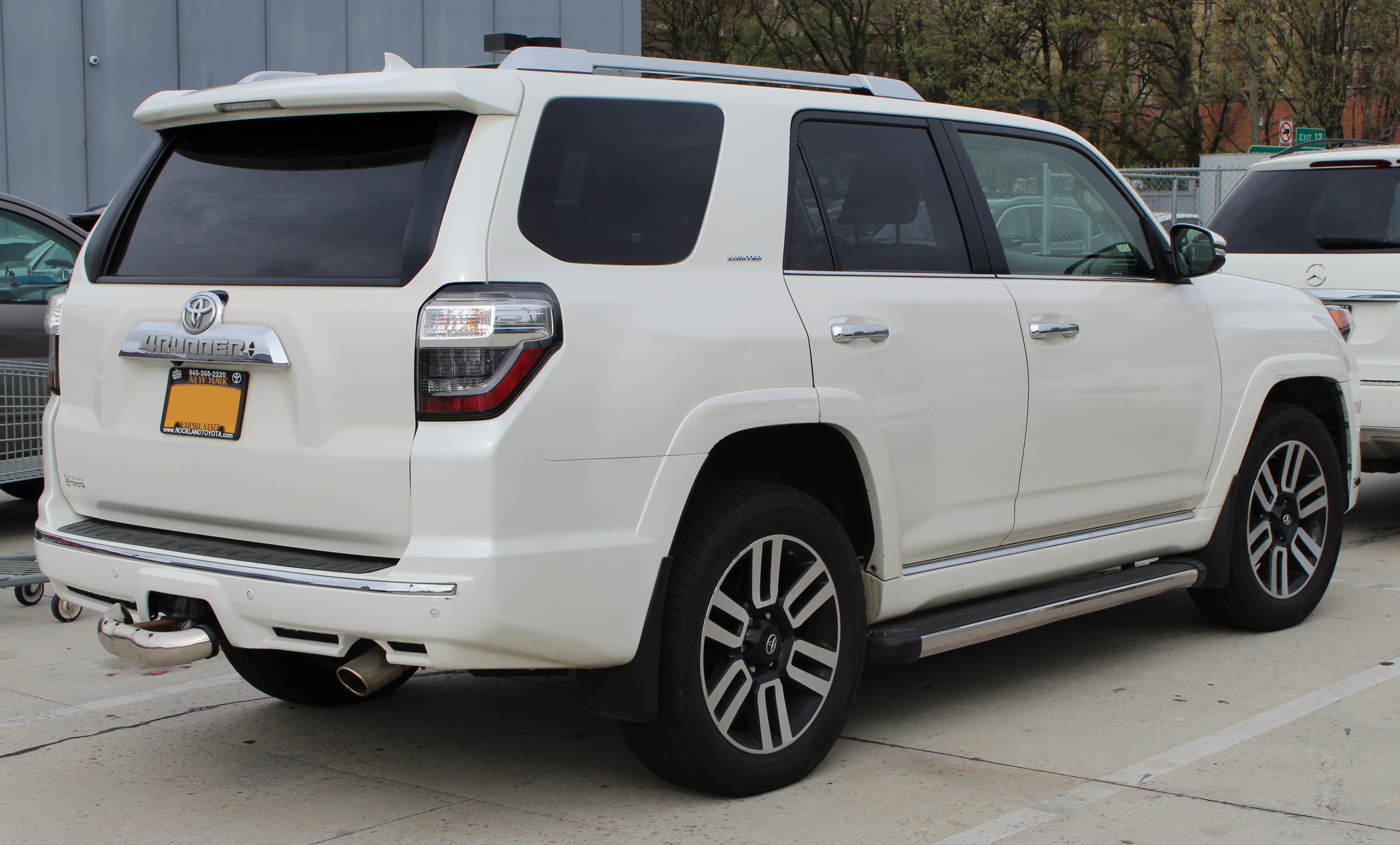
(Facelift) 2014 4Runner Limited (GRN280L)

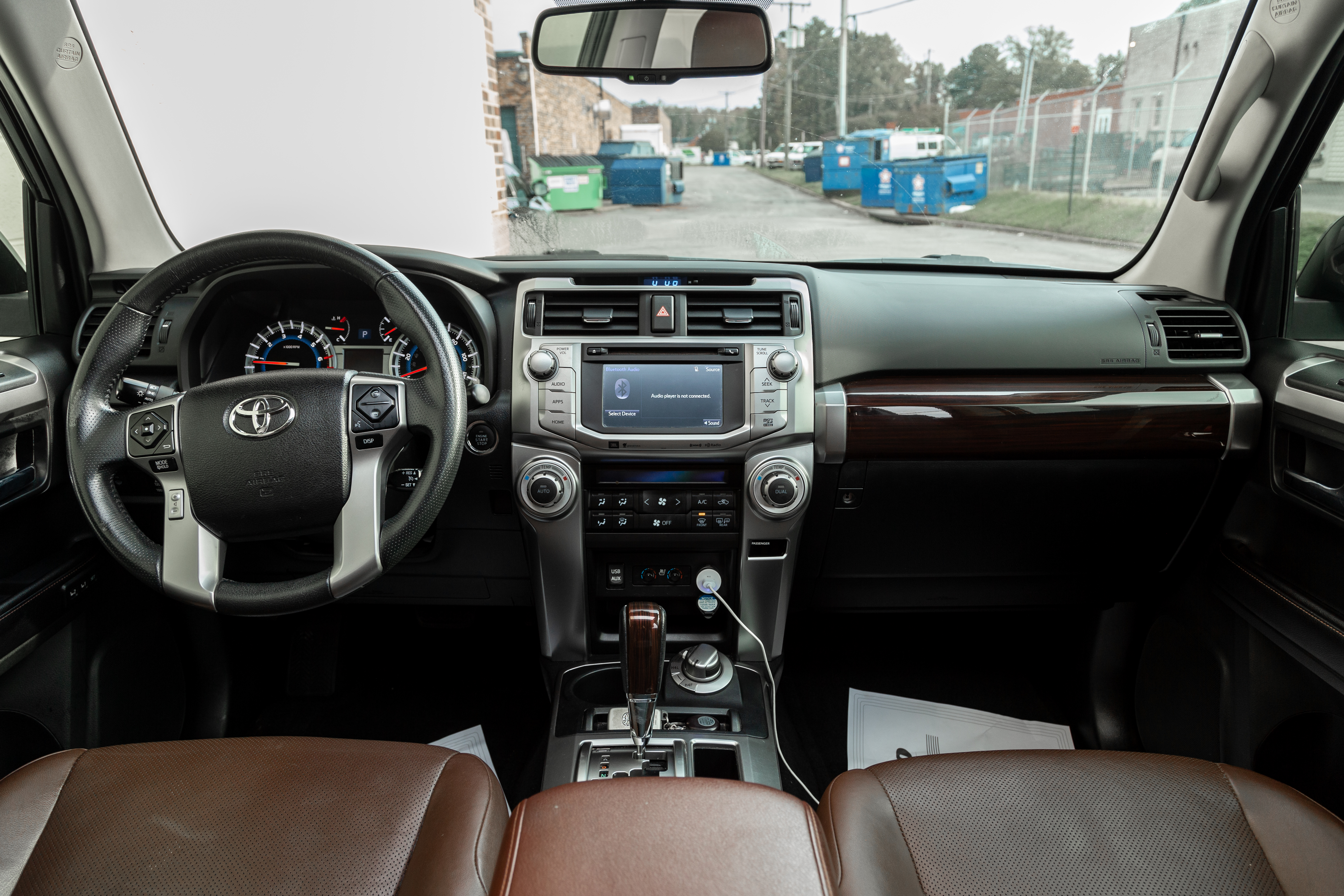
(Facelift) 4Runner Limited interior

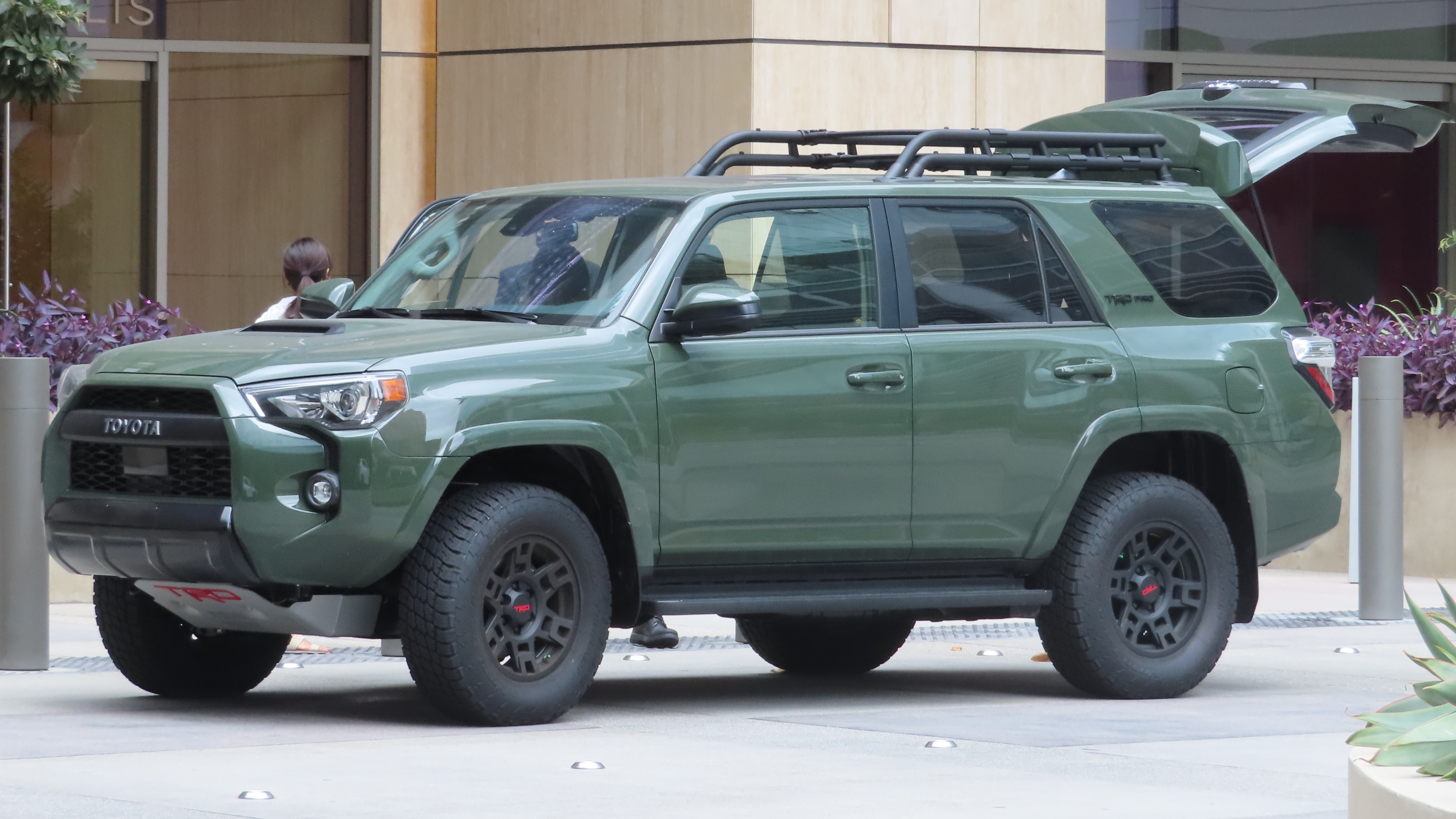
(Facelift) 2020 4Runner TRD Pro

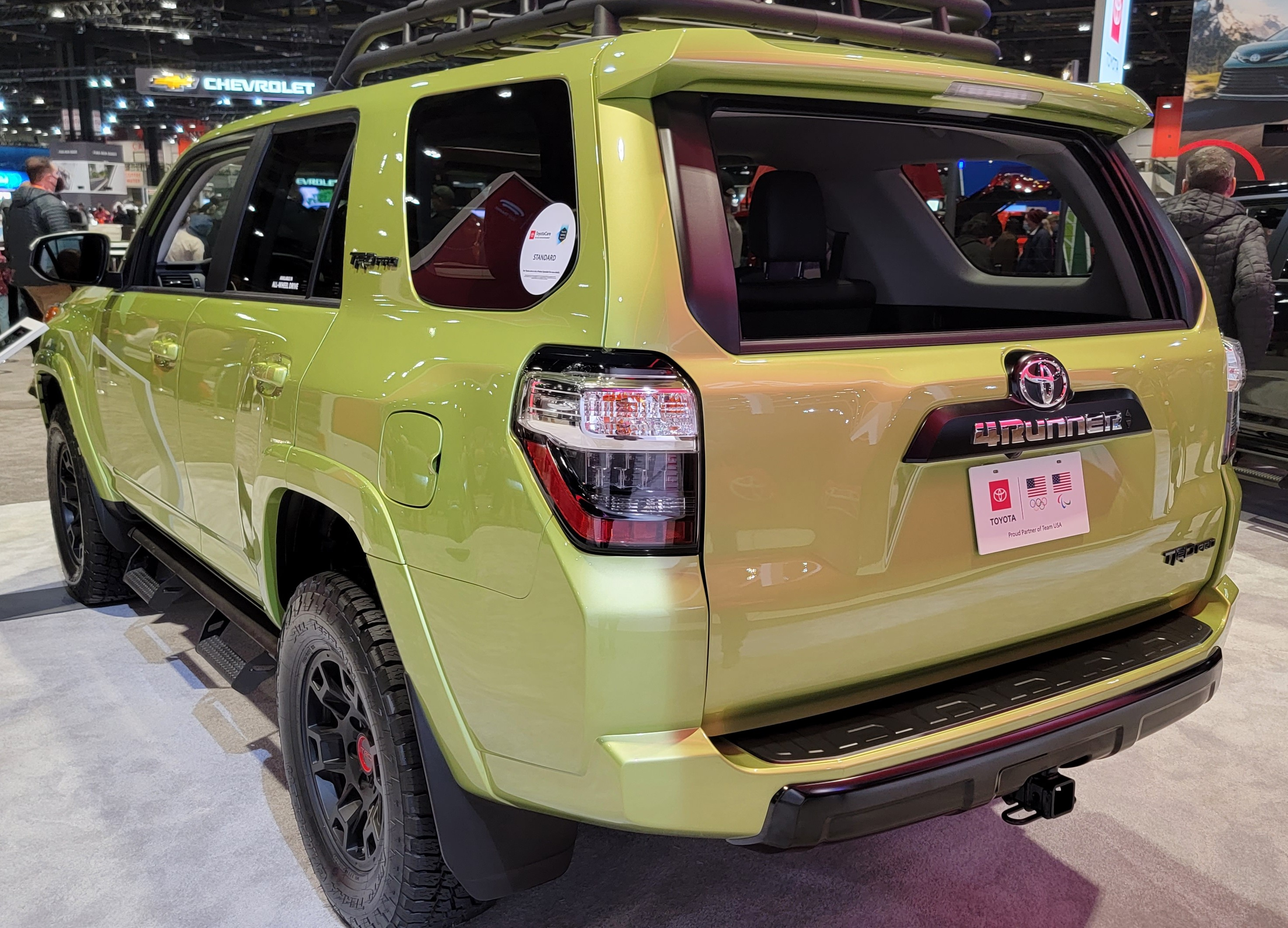
(Facelift) 2022 Toyota 4Runner TRD Pro in Lime Rush, rear view

=== Safety ===
2015 Toyota 4Runner on IIHS:
Category	Rating
Moderate overlap frontal offset	Good
Small overlap frontal offset (2014–present)	Marginal^{1}
Side impact	Good
Roof strength	Good^{2}

^{1} vehicle structure rated "Poor"
^{2} strength-to-weight ratio: 4.11

== Sixth generation (N500; 2024) ==
Sixth generation
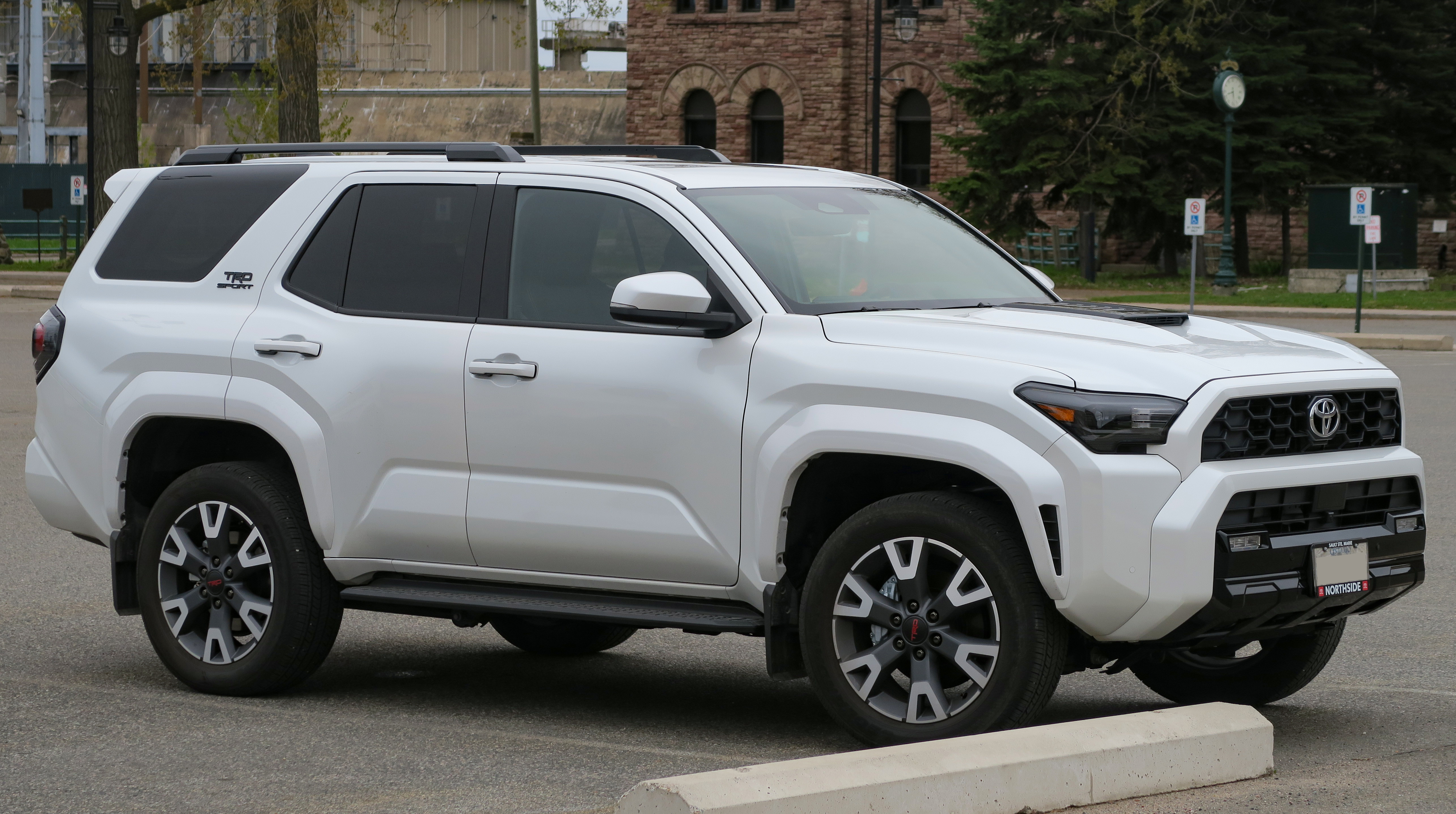
- 2025 4Runner TRD Sport (N500)

Overview
- Model code: N500
- Production: December 2024 – present
- Model years: 2025–present
- Assembly: Japan: Tahara, Aichi (Tahara plant)
- Designer: Adam Rabinowitz, Kevin Hunter

Body and chassis
- Class: Mid-size SUV
- Body style: 5-door SUV
- Platform: TNGA: GA-F
- Related: Toyota Tacoma (N400); Toyota Land Cruiser Prado (J250); Lexus GX (J250)

Powertrain
- Engine: Gasoline: 2.4 L T24A-FTS turbo I4 (TZNA50/55); Gasoline hybrid: 2.4 L T24A-FTS turbo I4 (TZNH55)
- Transmission: 8-speed "Direct Shift" ECTi automatic
- Hybrid drivetrain: Parallel (i-Force Max)
- Battery: 1.87 kWh, 6.5 Ah, 288 V NiMH (i-Force Max)

Dimensions
- Wheelbase: 2,850 mm (112.2 in)
- Length: 4,950 mm (194.9 in)
- Width: 1,976 mm (77.8 in)
- Height: 1,798 mm (70.8 in)
- Curb weight: 2,021–2,474 kg (4,456–5,454 lb)

The sixth-generation 4Runner was officially revealed on 9 April 2024. The 4Runner continues to be built in Toyota's Tahara plant in Japan, despite only being in left-hand drive form. Sales were initially set to commence after mid-2024, but was delayed to December 2024 at the earliest due to supply constraints on key parts shared with other vehicles. It is based on the same body-on-frame GA-F platform as the Tacoma pick-up truck, and they share many mechanical components.

Like its predecessors, the 4Runner retains the electrically roll-down back window feature. The engineering team managed to retain this feature by evaluating each individual component in the feature mechanism and took opportunities to reduce weight.

Some models will be offered with an optional third row seat; because the hybrid drivetrain uses the space beneath the load floor for its high-voltage battery, it is expected the hybrid will not include the third row.

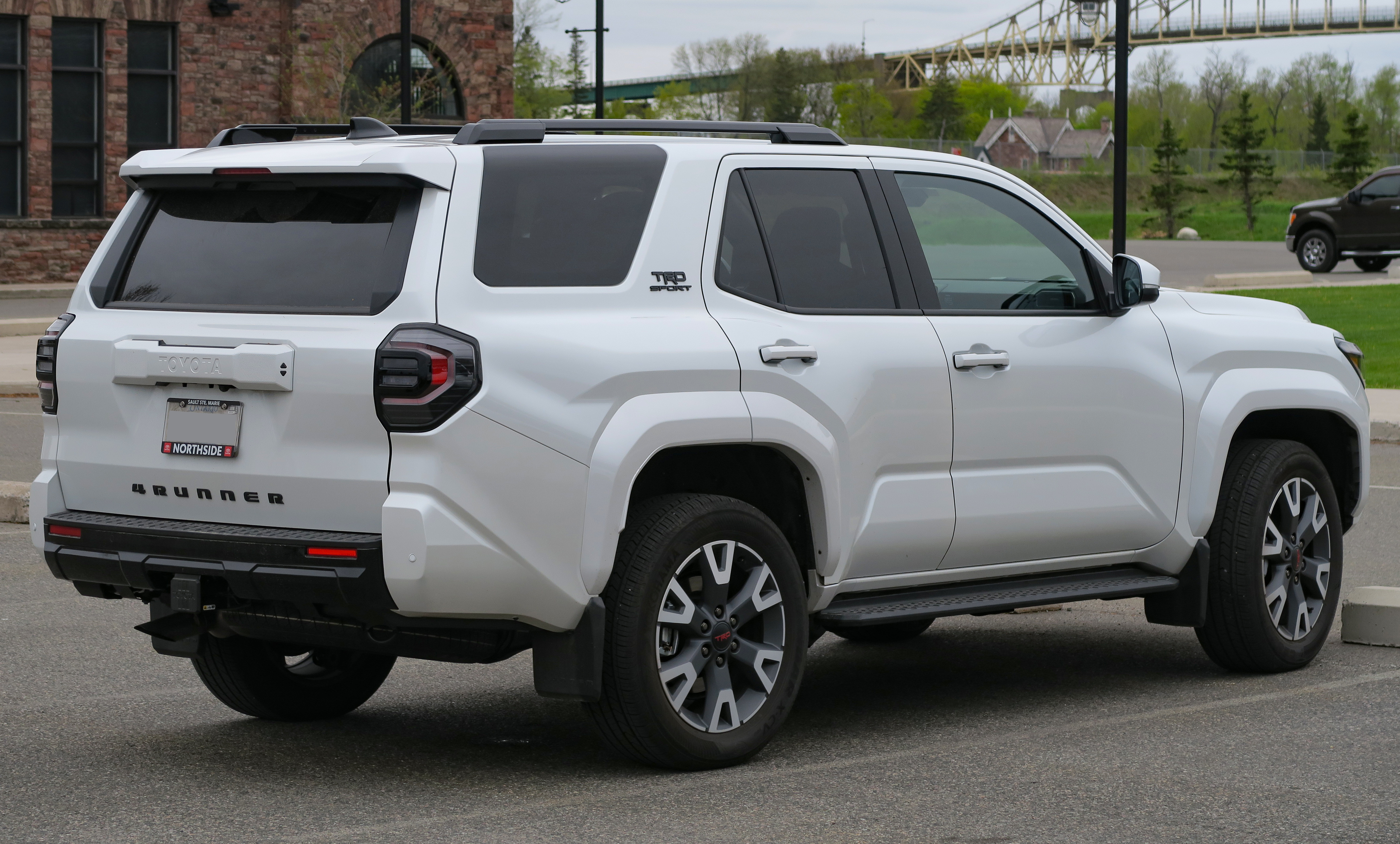
Rear view

=== Trim levels ===
The sixth-generation 4Runner will be available in nine trim levels, six of which carried over from the previous generation: SR5, TRD Sport, TRD Off-Road, TRD Off-Road Premium, Limited, and TRD Pro, and three new trims: TRD Sport Premium, a replacement for the earlier SR5 Premium trim; Trailhunter, with overlanding-specific equipment; and Platinum, a new luxury-oriented trim.

A base i-Force drivetrain is standard on SR5, TRD Sport, TRD Sport Premium, TRD Off-Road, TRD Off-Road Premium and Limited trims, while a parallel hybrid i-Force Max drivetrain is available on TRD Off-Road, TRD Off-Road Premium, and Limited trims, and standard on Platinum, TRD Pro and Trailhunter trims.

The Trailhunter features 33-inch off-road tires, ARB's Old Man Emu (OME) 2.5-inch forged shocks with rear external remote reservoirs, ARB-designed roof rack, raised ground clearance by 2-inch and 1.5-inch front and rear respectively, a high-mounted air intake for the i-Force Max powertrain and high-strength steel skid plates. For the exterior styling, the Trailhunter has Toyota heritage grille with bronze “TOYOTA” lettering, an integrated 20-inch LED light bar and color selectable LED foglights.

6th Generation 4Runner drivetrains
Engine (Trans) Trim	iForce (8sp. auto)	iForce MAX (8sp. auto hybrid)
SR5	Yes	No
TRD Sport	Yes	No
TRD Sport Premium	Yes	No
TRD Off-Road	Yes	Yes
TRD Off-Road Premium	Yes	Yes
Limited	Yes	Yes
Platinum	No	Yes
TRD Pro	No	Yes
Trailhunter	No	Yes
Type	2.4 L turbo I4	
Power	278 hp (282 PS)	326 hp (331 PS)
Power	278 hp (282 PS)	[48 hp (36 kW) electric]
Torque	317 lb⋅ft (430 N⋅m)	465 lb⋅ft (630 N⋅m)
Torque	317 lb⋅ft (430 N⋅m)	[184 lb⋅ft (249 N⋅m) electric]

== Sales ==
Calendar year	US	Canada
1984	6,498	
1985	5,495	
1986	5,564	
1987	3,635	
1988	20,880	
1989	36,927	
1990	48,295	
1991	44,879	
1992	39,917	
1993	46,652	
1994	74,109	
1995	75,962	
1996	99,597	
1997	128,496	
1998	118,484	
1999	124,221	
2000	111,797	
2001	90,250	
2002	77,026	
2003	109,308	
2004	114,212	
2005	103,830	1,189
2006	103,086	2,213
2007	87,718	1,530
2008	47,878	725
2009	19,675	680
2010	46,531	2,820
2011	44,316	2,580
2012	48,755	2,878
2013	51,625	3,110
2014	76,906	4,013
2015	97,034	5,736
2016	111,970	6,677
2017	128,296	7,869
2018	139,694	8,137
2019	131,864	8,230
2020	129,052	6,801
2021	144,696	8,293
2022	121,023	
2023	119,238	
2024	92,156	
2025	98,805	

== See also ==
- List of Toyota vehicles
