= Acoustic Control Induction System =

Variable-length intake manifold system designed by Toyota

The ACIS/TVIS System

Acoustic Control Induction System, or ACIS, is an implementation of a variable-length intake manifold system designed by Toyota.

Simply put, the ACIS system uses a single intake air control valve located in the intake to vary the length of the intake tract in order to optimize power and torque, as well as provide better fuel efficiency and reduce intake "roar".

The engine control unit (ECU) controls the position of one or more air control valves based on input signals from throttle angle and engine RPM. The vacuum switching valve (VSV) which controls the vacuum supply to the actuator is normally closed and passes vacuum to the actuator when it is energized by the ECU. By energizing the VSV vacuum is passed to the actuator, closing the air control valve. This effectively lengthens the intake manifold run. By de-energizing the VSV, vacuum to the actuator is blocked and trapped vacuum is bled off of the actuator diaphragm. Toyota ACIS is an On/Off system. The valve (or valves in newer models with multiple valves to create more than 2 lengths) is either fully opened or fully closed. An example of early single-valve ACIS programming would be the 3.0L 3VZ-FE engine. The ECU actuates the VSV to close the valve when the throttle position is 60% or greater and engine speed is 3,900 RPM or more.

Some engines, such as the 2GR-FE, lack a VSV for the ACIS; instead, these utilize an electronically-controlled actuator.

Applications:

- 5E-FHE
- 1G-FE (VVT-i)
- 1GR-FE (Single VVT-i variants only)
- 2GR-FE (Electronically actuated)
- 1GZ-FE
- 2JZ-GE
- 7M-GE
- 3S-GE
- 1S-iLU
- 1MZ-FE
- 3UR-FE
- 1UZ-FE (VVT-i)
- 3VZ-FE
- 2ZR-FE

== See also ==
- T-VIS
