= Toyota VZ engine =

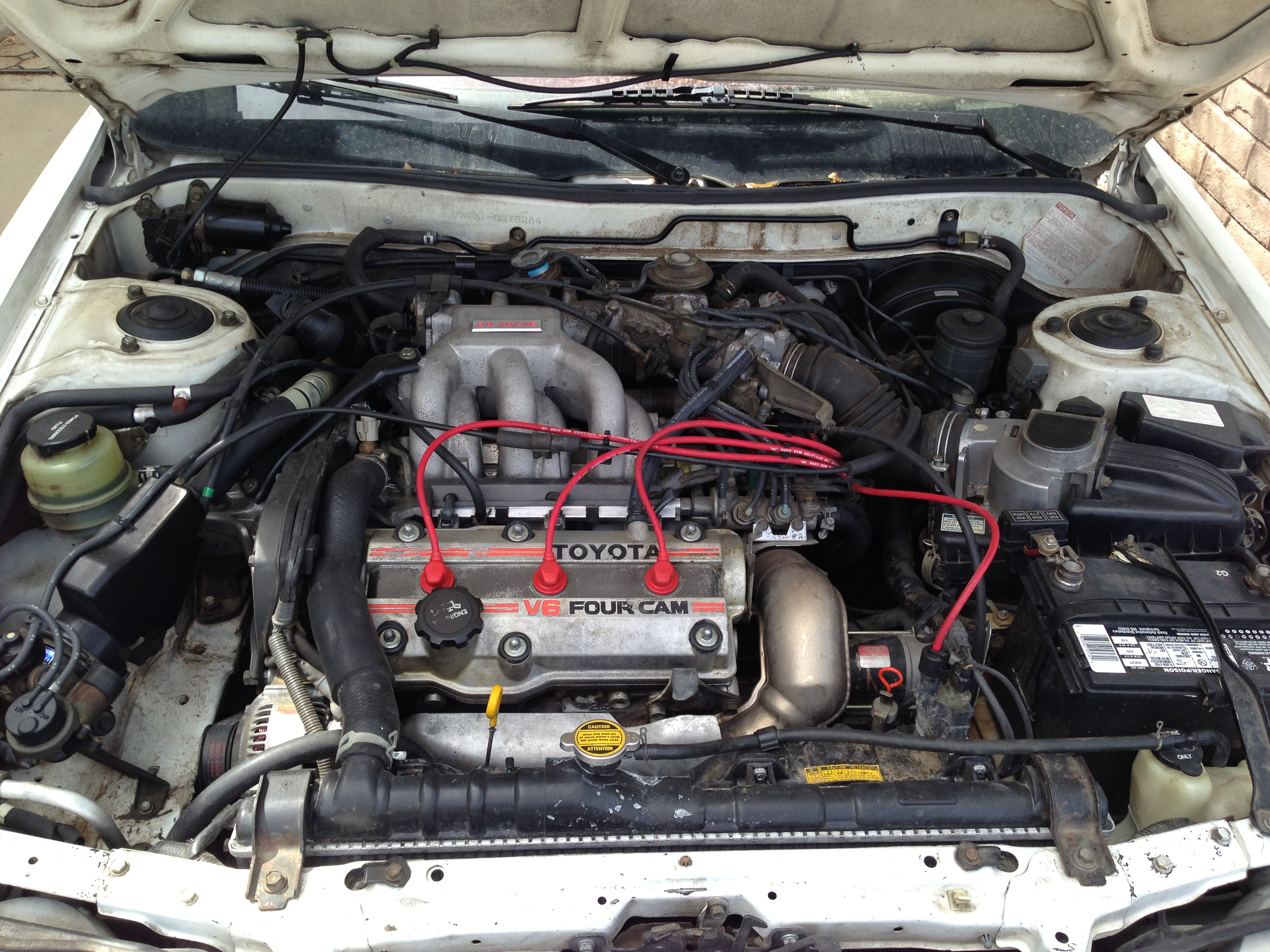
- 2VZ-FE engine in a 1989 Toyota Camry DX

Overview
- Manufacturer: Toyota Motor Corporation
- Production: 1988–2004

Layout
- Configuration: 60° V6
- Displacement: 2.0–3.4 L (1,992–3,378 cc)
- Cylinder block material: Cast iron
- Cylinder head material: Aluminium
- Valvetrain: SOHC 2 valves x cyl. DOHC 4 valves x cyl.
- Compression ratio: 9.0:1-9.6:1

Combustion
- Supercharger: TRD (some versions)
- Fuel system: EFI Multi-port fuel injection
- Fuel type: Gasoline
- Cooling system: Water-cooled

Output
- Power output: 101–142 kW (136–190 hp; 138–193 PS)
- Torque output: 216–298 N⋅m (159–220 lb⋅ft)

Chronology
- Predecessor: Toyota G engine (Straight-six)
- Successor: Toyota MZ engine Toyota GR engine

The Toyota VZ engine family is a series of V6 gasoline piston engines ranging from 2.0 to 3.4 L (1,992 to 3,378 cc) in displacement and both SOHC and DOHC configurations. It was the first V6 engine made by Toyota.

Developed in response to Nissan's VG engine series (which was one of the first mass-produced Japanese V6 engines), the VZ family uses a 60° V-angle design and introduced many changes for Toyota, including various EFI, ECU, and engine improvements from generation to generation. The low angle DOHC and SOHC cylinder heads excel in low-mid torque and power, making the VZ series well-suited for various uses in cars, trucks, and SUVs.

The blocks are all strongly made using cast iron with large interconnected main bearing cradles and two bolt main bearing caps. Cylinder heads are made from aluminium. Forged steel crankshafts and cast iron main bearing support girdles became standard with the 3VZ-FE. Piston and ring construction are typical parts, with rods varying between large and very large for stock V6 production engines.

This series was phased out in several markets and was replaced by variants of the MZ and GR series of V6 engines.

== 1VZ-FE ==
The 1VZ-FE is a 2.0 L (1,992 cc) version, produced from 1987 to 1993. Bore and stroke is 78 mm × 69.5 mm (3.07 in × 2.74 in). Output is 103 kW (138 hp; 140 PS) at 6000 rpm and 174 N⋅m (128 lb⋅ft) at 4600 rpm. It uses a DOHC layout with a cast iron block and an aluminium 24 valve head.

To compensate for the engine's use in FWD configurations, this engine was tilted close to the firewall (approximately ~15 degrees) so that it can fit satisfactorily in FWD cars. This makes repairing the engines a more complicated task because access to the other three cylinder banks and spark plugs requires removing the intake plenum and manifold first in order to access them. This trait is shared across most DOHC variants of the VZ family as well as all other V6 engines made by Toyota that are used in FWD configurations.

Applications:

- 1988–1991 Toyota Camry Prominent (Japan only)
- 1988–1991 Toyota Vista (V20) (Japan only)

== 2VZ-FE ==
The 2VZ-FE is a 2.5 L (2,507 cc) version, produced from 1987 to 1992. Bore and stroke is 87.5 mm × 69.5 mm (3.44 in × 2.74 in) and the compression ratio is 9.0:1. Output as fitted to the North American Lexus ES250 is 116 kW (156 hp; 158 PS) at 5600 rpm and 217 N⋅m (160 lb⋅ft) at 4400 rpm with redline limit of 6800 rpm. It uses a DOHC layout with a cast iron block and an aluminium 24 valve head.

Like the 1VZ-FE and the later 3VZ-FE (as well as most Toyota V6 engines since), the engines are tilted in a way that allows for them to be fitted in FWD configurations.

Applications:

- 1988–1991 Toyota Camry (V20)
- 1989–1991 Lexus ES 250

== 3VZ-E ==
The 3VZ-E is a 3.0 L (2,958 cc) version, produced from 1987 to 1995. Bore remains at 87.5 mm (3.44 in) but stroke is pushed to 82 mm (3.23 in). Power outputs ranged from 108–112 kW (145–150 hp; 147–152 PS) at 4800 rpm with 244 N⋅m (180 lb⋅ft) of torque at 3400 rpm. It uses an SOHC layout with a cast iron block and an aluminium 12 valve head.

Despite the 3VZ-FE sharing the same engine family designation as the 3VZ-E, the two engines have little in common with each other in terms of parts.

Applications:

- 1988–1995 Toyota 4Runner
- 1988–1995 Toyota Pickup
- 1988–1995 Toyota Hilux
- 1992–1994 Toyota T100

== 3VZ-FE ==
The 3VZ-FE is a 3.0 L (2,958 cc) version, produced from 1992 to 1997. It retains the same bore and stroke at 87.5 mm × 82 mm (3.44 in × 3.23 in). Output is rated at 138 kW (185 hp; 188 PS) at 5800 rpm and 256 N⋅m (189 lb⋅ft) at 4600 rpm, with a compression ratio of 9.6:1. The stock redline is 6600 rpm with fuel/ignition cut-off at 7200 rpm.

The 3VZ-FE is a revised variant of the 3VZ-E using a DOHC layout with a cast iron block and aluminium 24 valve heads. Because the VZ series was originally designed for pickup truck and SUV use in RWD configurations, the 3VZ-FE happens to be a physically tall motor. In order to make the engine fit in FWD cars such as the Camry and ES300/Windom, the motor was tilted towards the firewall (approximately ~15 degrees). This "tilt" is so severe that it requires a different intake plenum to the installed, and reaching the rear bank of cylinders and spark plugs is nearly impossible without first removing the intake plenum. All other Toyota V6 engines made since then (which includes the 1VZ-FE, 2VZ-FE and 4VZ-FE engines in the VZ family as well as engines in the MZ and GR family among others) all used this same maneuver in order to make the engines usable in FWD configurations.

Parts-wise, the 3VZ-FE shares very little with the rest of the VZ engine family. The main bearings are shared with the 3VZ-E, but nothing else. It also uses a forged steel crankshaft and cast connecting rods, and the upper intake plenum is a split-chamber design using Toyota's ACIS variable-intake system, feeding three sets of runners for both heads. Cams are interchangeable with the 3VZ-FE and 5VZ-FE heads.

The 3VZ-FE is fairly common in most parts of the world, having a long lifespan in popular models. It was used from 1992 to 1997 depending on the market: North America only saw the engine from 1992 to 1993 in the Camry and ES300, where it was replaced with the all-aluminium 1MZ-FE engine in 1993 and 1994. Other markets retained the 3VZ-FE engine; Australia and New Zealand had it from 1992 to 1996 (especially in the Camry), and was available in Japan with the Scepter (the Japanese version of the XV10 Camry) and Windom (the Japanese version of the XV10 ES300) until December 1996 and May 1997 respectively.

Applications:

- 1992–1993 Toyota Camry (North America)
- 1992–1993 Lexus ES300 (North America)
- 1992–1996 Toyota Camry (Australia and Europe)
- 1992–1996 Toyota Windom (Japan only)
- 1993–1996 Toyota Scepter (Japan only)

== 4VZ-FE ==
The 4VZ-FE is a 2.5 L (2,496 cc) version, replacing the 2VZ-FE as Toyota's new 2.5 L V6 engine produced from 1992 to 1998. Bore is 87.5 mm (3.44 in) and stroke is slightly shorter at 69.2 mm (2.72 in). Output is 129 kW (173 hp; 175 PS) at 6000 rpm. Compression ratio is raised from 9.0:1 to 9.6:1. It uses a DOHC layout with a cast iron block and an aluminium 24 valve head.

Applications:

- 1992–1996 Toyota Camry Prominent (Japan only)
- 1993–1996 Toyota Windom VCV11 (Japan only)

== 5VZ-FE ==
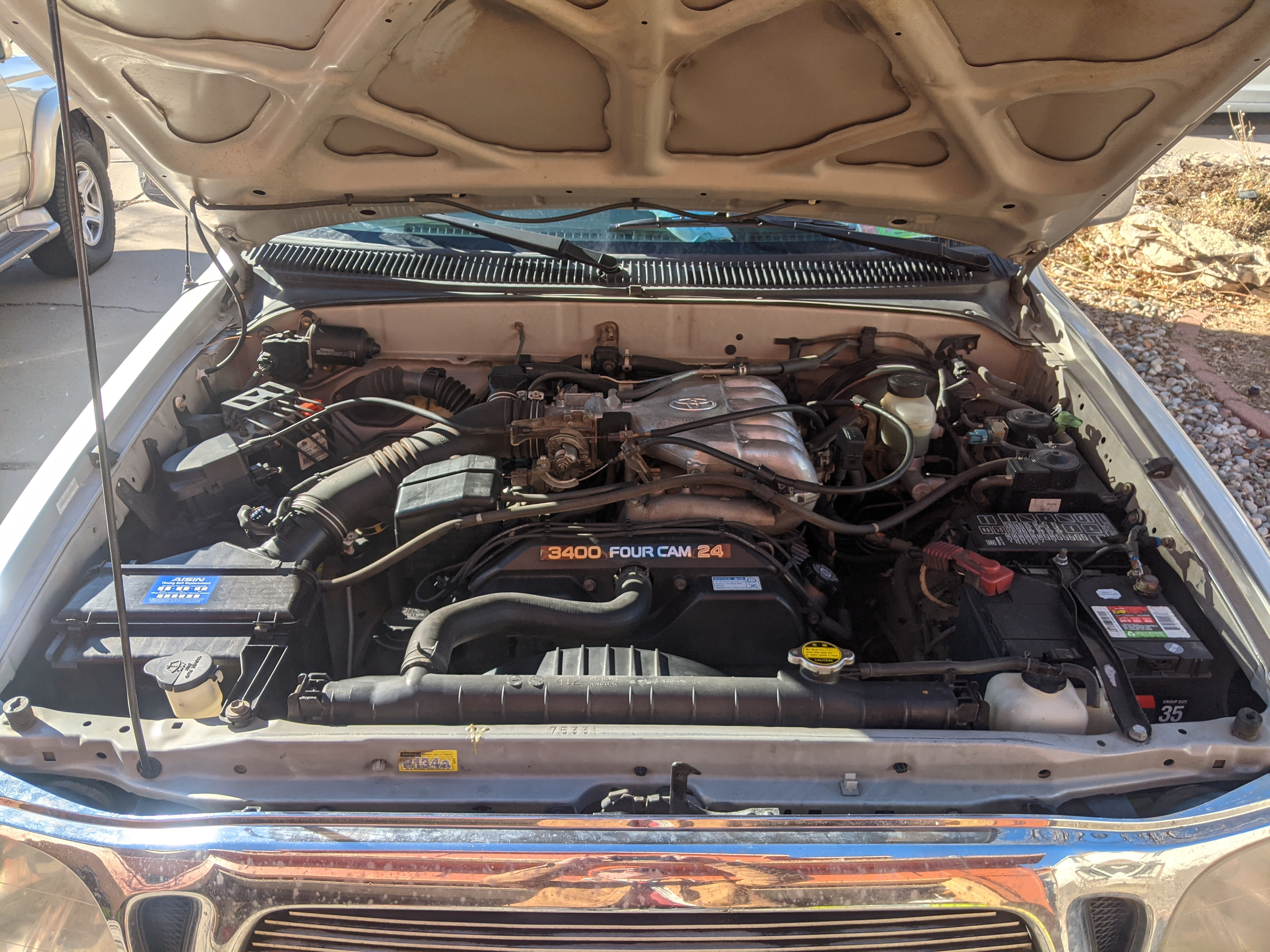
5VZ-FE Engine from a 2001 Toyota Tacoma

The 5VZ-FE is a 3.4 L (3,378 cc) version, replacing the 3VZ-E as Toyota's new 3.4 L V6 engine produced from 1995 to 2004. Bore is up to 93.5 mm (3.68 in) while the stroke remains at 82 mm (3.23 in). Output is 142 kW (190 hp; 193 PS) for Tacoma and 136 kW (183 hp; 186 PS) for 4Runner at 4800 rpm with 298 N⋅m (220 lb⋅ft) for Tacoma and 294 N⋅m (217 lb⋅ft) for 4Runner at 3600 rpm. Compression ratio remains at 9.6:1, the same as the 3VZ-FE and 4VZ-FE. It uses a DOHC layout with a cast iron block and aluminium 24 valve head.

The 5VZ-FE uses sequential multi-port fuel injection, has four valves per cylinder with shim-over-bucket tappets and features large cast connecting rods, one-piece cast camshafts, a cast crank (unlike the 3VZ-FE, which was forged) and a cast aluminium intake manifold. This engine also sometimes features an oil cooler (depending on application) and a wasted spark ignition system with three coils. Camshafts are belt-driven. It is a non-interference engine.

A factory supported bolt-on supercharger kit for the 5VZ-FE was sold for the Tacoma, 4Runner, T100 and Tundra by Toyota Racing Development in North America, using a Roots type supercharger. This increased power and torque to 258 PS (254 hp; 189 kW) and 366 N⋅m (270 lb⋅ft) (used for the 1997–2004 model year Toyota Tacoma models). It was specified for use only on 1997 and newer model year vehicles, however, as the 1995 and 1996 model year vehicles have performance issues with the supercharger installed due to the limitations of the ECUs being used for said vehicles.

Applications:

- 1996–2004 Toyota Land Cruiser Prado
- 1995–1998 Toyota T-100
- 1995–2002 Toyota Granvia
- 1999–2002 Toyota Grand HiAce
- 1995–2004 Toyota Tacoma
- 1995–2004 Toyota Hilux
- 1996–2002 Toyota 4Runner
- 2000–2004 Toyota Tundra
- 2000–2002, 2004 GAZ-3111 Volga

== See also ==
- List of Toyota engines
