= Toyota Sequoia =

Full-size sport utility vehicle

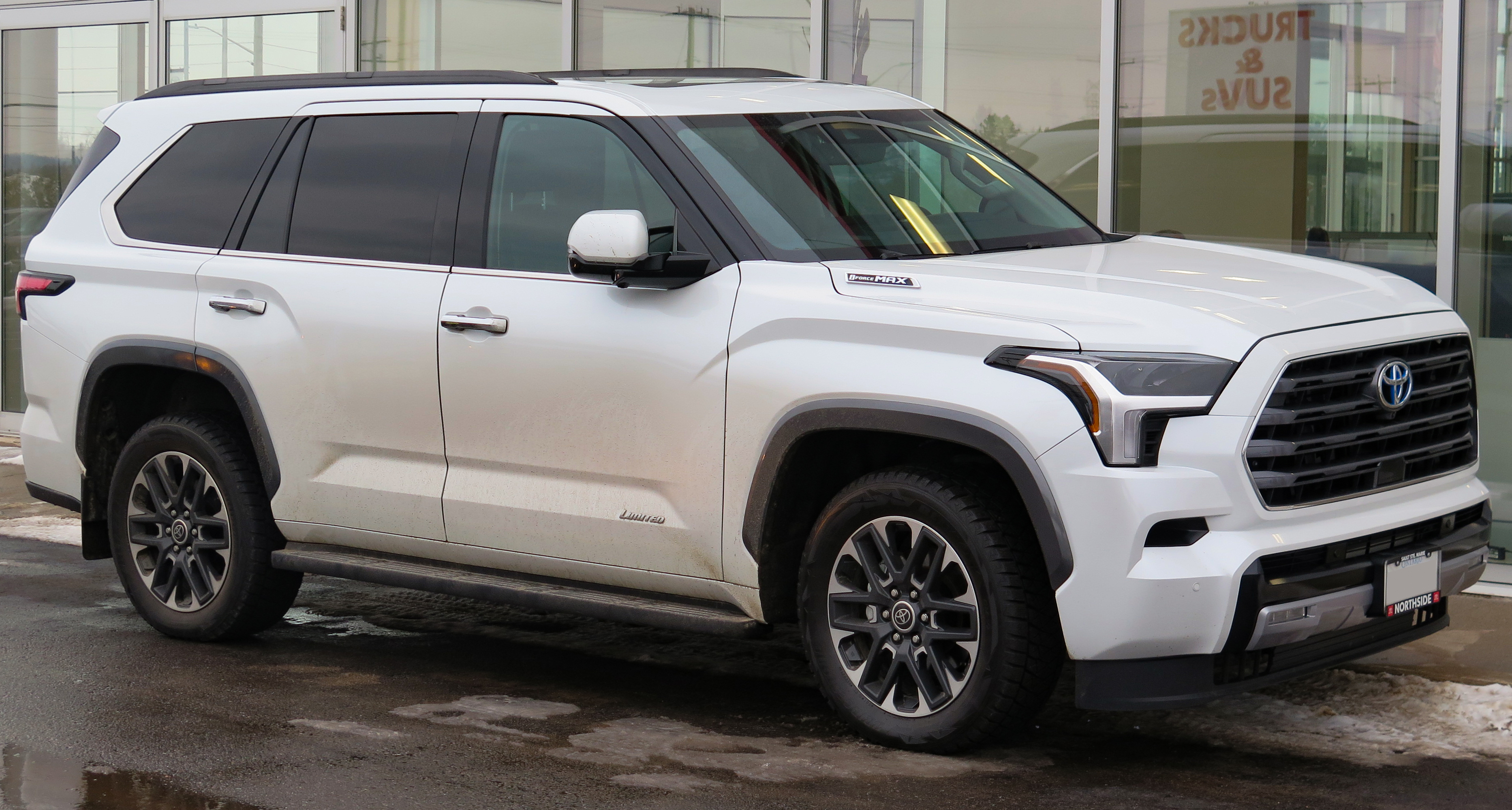

Overview
- Manufacturer: Toyota
- Production: September 2000 – present
- Model years: 2001–present

Body and chassis
- Class: Full-size SUV
- Body style: 5-door SUV
- Layout: Front-engine, rear-wheel-drive; Front-engine, four-wheel-drive
- Chassis: Body-on-frame
- Related: Toyota Tundra; Toyota Land Cruiser; Lexus LX

The Toyota Sequoia is a full-size SUV manufactured by Toyota mainly for the North American market since 2000 for the 2001 model year, being derived from the Tundra pickup truck. It is the second largest SUV ever produced under the Toyota brand, after the Japan-exclusive, military-focused Mega Cruiser.

Previously manufactured at Toyota Motor Manufacturing Indiana in Princeton, Indiana between 2000 and 2021, and then in Toyota Motor Manufacturing Texas in San Antonio, Texas since 2022, the Sequoia is the first vehicle from a Japanese marque in the popular mainstream full-sized SUV class in North America, and initial planning done by first-generation Sequoia chief engineer Kaoru Hosokawa aimed the Sequoia directly at the Ford Expedition, Chevrolet Tahoe/GMC Yukon, and other full-size SUVs.

Up until the 2021 model year, the Sequoia was slotted between the mid-size 4Runner and the premium Land Cruiser in the North American Toyota SUV lineup. With the discontinuation of North American sales of the Land Cruiser from the 2022 model year onward, the Sequoia became the flagship SUV in Toyota's North America lineup.

As of 2021, the Sequoia is sold in the United States, Canada, Mexico, and Costa Rica. It is offered in left-hand drive only.

The Sequoia is named after the Giant Sequoia, a species of tall redwood trees native to California.

== First generation (XK30/XK40; 2000) ==
First generation
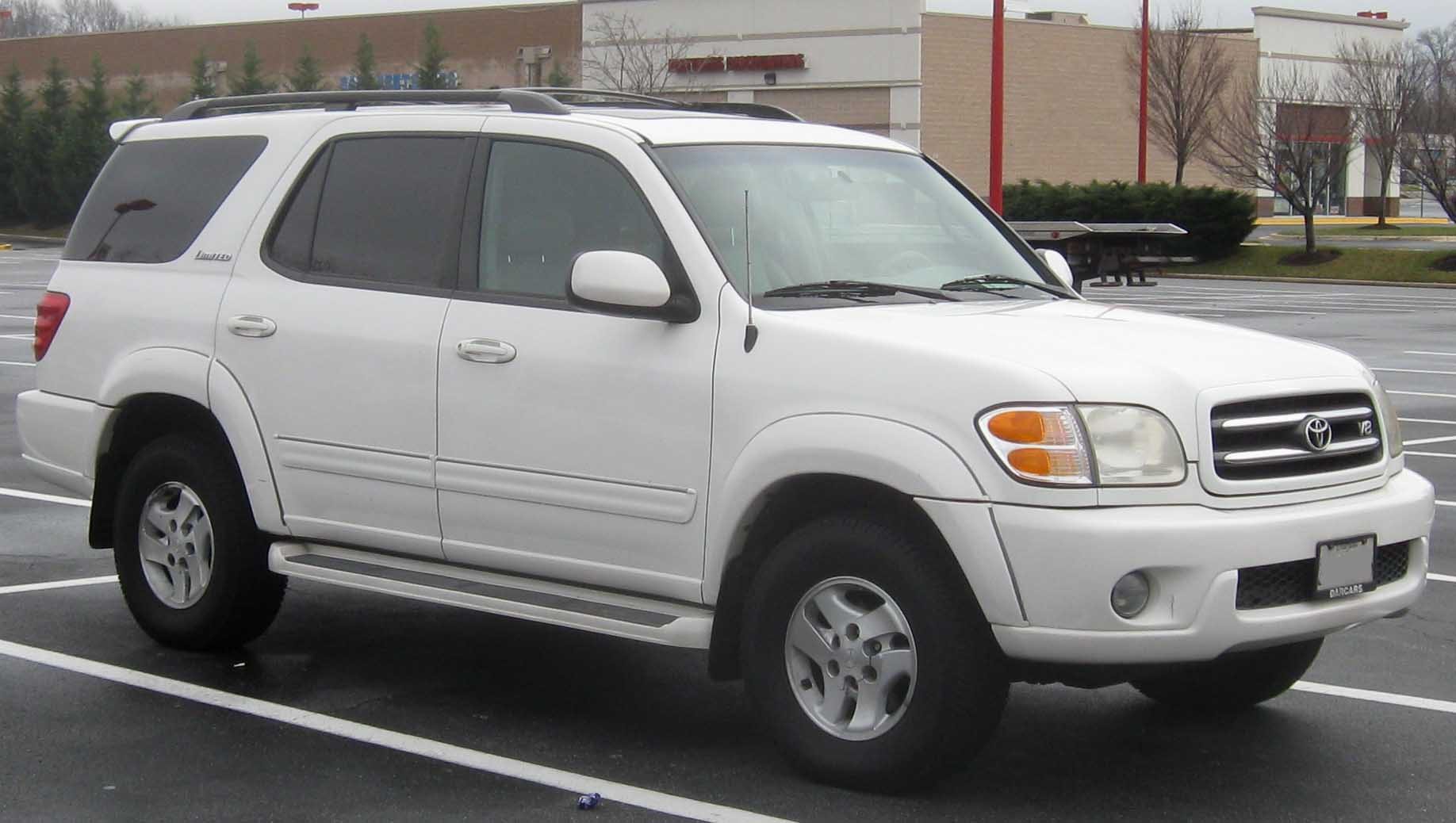

Overview
- Model code: XK30 (rear-wheel drive); XK40 (four-wheel drive)
- Production: September 2000 – November 2007
- Model years: 2001–2007
- Assembly: United States: Princeton, Indiana (TMMI)
- Designer: Toshihiko Shirasawa (1997)

Body and chassis
- Related: Toyota Tundra (XK30/XK40)

Powertrain
- Engine: Gasoline: 4.7 L 2UZ-FE V8 (UCK35/45; 2001–2004); 4.7 L 2UZ-FE VVT-i V8 (UCK35/45; 2005–2007)
- Power output: 240 hp (179 kW; 243 PS) (2001–2004); 282 hp (210 kW; 286 PS) (2005); 273 hp (204 kW; 277 PS) (2006–2007)
- Transmission: 4-speed automatic (2001–2004); 5-speed automatic (2005–2007)

Dimensions
- Wheelbase: 118.1 in (3,000 mm)
- Length: 203.9 in (5,179 mm)
- Width: 76.0–78.9 in (1,930–2,004 mm)
- Height: 72.8–76.2 in (1,849–1,935 mm)

Development of a full-size SUV alongside a T100 replacement began in the mid-1990s, with a design freeze in 1997 (styled by Toshihiko Shirasawa) and design patent filing of the production design on April 4, 1998, at the Japan Patent Office (JPO) under #1054583. After the introduction of the Toyota Tundra in 1999, speculation started that Toyota intended to compete in the full-size SUV market with a Tundra-based SUV called the Highlander. However, the Highlander name was used on a mid-size Camry-based crossover and the Tundra-based SUV was introduced on January 11, 2000, at the North American International Auto Show as the Toyota Sequoia, with full production starting in September 2000 for the 2001 model year.

The engine, dashboard, sheetmetal, and chassis are shared with the Tundra, with the exception of rear disc brakes and a more sophisticated multi-link live axle rear suspension. A notable feature is the power rear window, which is also featured on the Toyota 4Runner and Double Cab version of the Toyota Tundra since its introduction in 2003 for the 2004 model year. The Sequoia was nominated for the North American Truck of the Year award in 2001. When the Sequoia was introduced, it was slightly longer than the contemporary Land Cruiser, larger than the Chevrolet Tahoe in most dimensions and similar in size to the Ford Expedition; its low emissions V8 engine made the Sequoia a certified Ultra Low Emission Vehicle. Frame assemblies and driveshafts are produced by Dana Holding Corporation.

The Sequoia came in two trim levels: SR5 and Limited. It was sold in both two-wheel drive and four-wheel drive versions. From 2001 to 2004, four-wheel-drive was activated by the "4WD" button on the dashboard and then operated by a separate shifter in the center console, with the center differential automatically locking when low range is engaged and the column shifter is placed into L. 2003-2004 models were updated with the "VSC OFF" button being replaced with a center differential lock button, thereby allowing the center differential to be locked in 4-H as well as 4-L. From 2005 to 2007, both four-wheel-drive and central locking were both activated and operated by dashboard buttons. Toyota's TRAC traction control system and Vehicle Stability Control were standard on all models, while all 4WD models received the A-TRAC system.

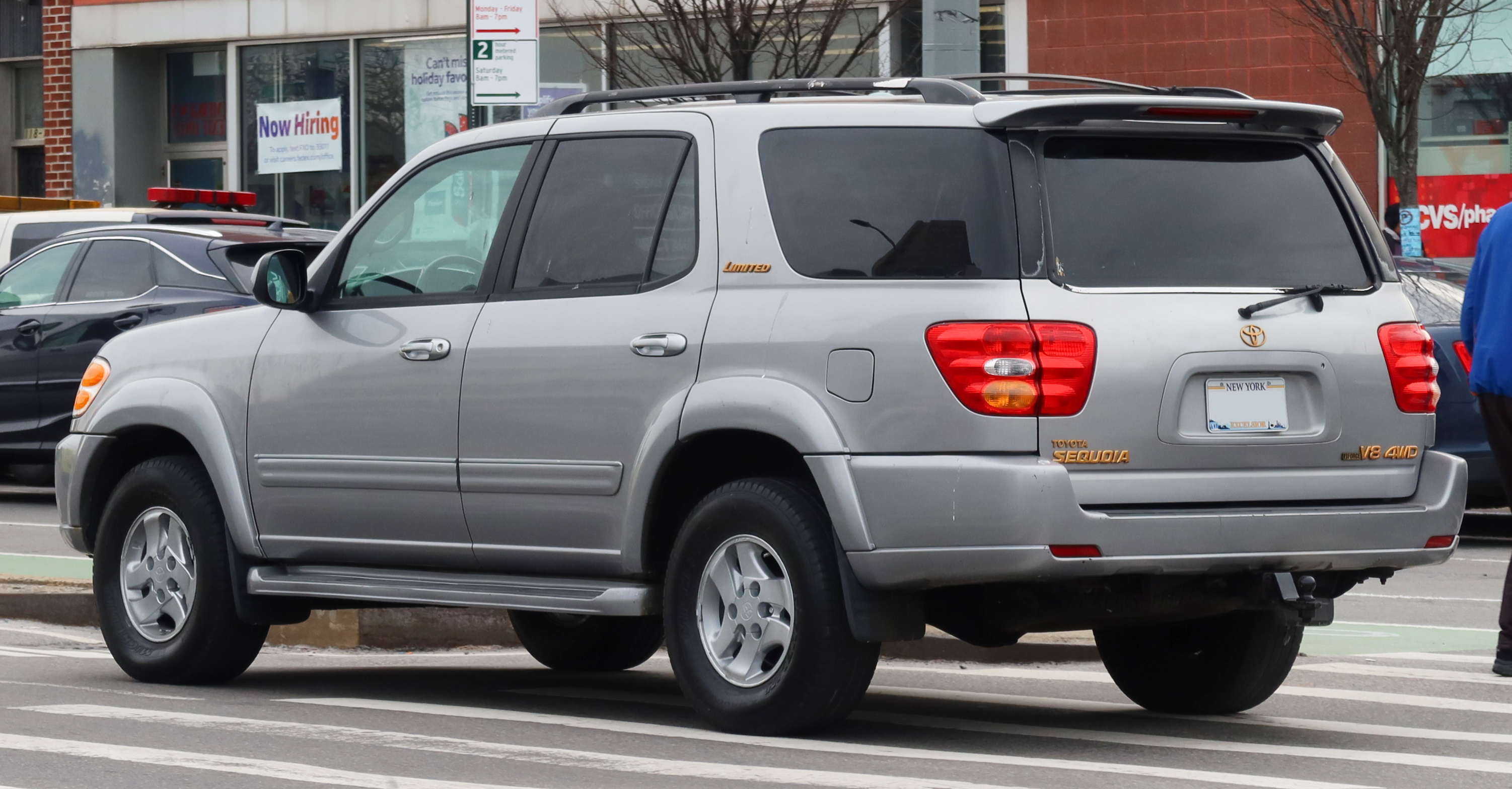
Sequoia Limited, rear, pre-facelift

=== Facelift ===
In 2004, for the 2005 model year, the Sequoia received a minor facelift. Its 2UZ-FE engine was upgraded, now featuring VVT-i and a 42 hp (31 kW) increase, and it also received a new 5-speed automatic transmission, replacing the previous 4-speed. Four wheel drive models got a Torsen center differential, replacing its previously open differential, that splits power in full-time mode 40% front and 60% rear under normal driving, and can send up to 53% to the front and 71% to the rear during slip. The grille headlights were redesigned, as well as the taillights, which featured a new design with no amber lamps. It also gained an in-glass antenna, replacing the retractable antenna. Interior updates included a redesigned gauge cluster with optional electroluminescent Optitron gauges, optional touch screen-operated stereo and navigation system, and optional rear air suspension with raising and lowering adjustment. Additionally, second row captain's chairs with a removable center console were offered. New option packages included the Sport Package and Luxury Limited Package.

In 2005, for the 2006 model year, the SR5 trim ditched the 3-spoke wheel design for a more traditional 5-spoke wheel design, while the Limited trim carried over the split 5-spoke wheel design from pre-facelift models. Additionally, the option for 24K gold-plated badges was no longer offered.

For the 2006-2007 model years, the power rating was measured differently, resulting in a drop to 273 hp (204 kW), but essentially the same engine was used.

Towing capacity for the 2005 model year:

- 2WD: 6,500 lb (2,948 kg)
- 4WD: 6,200 lb (2,812 kg)
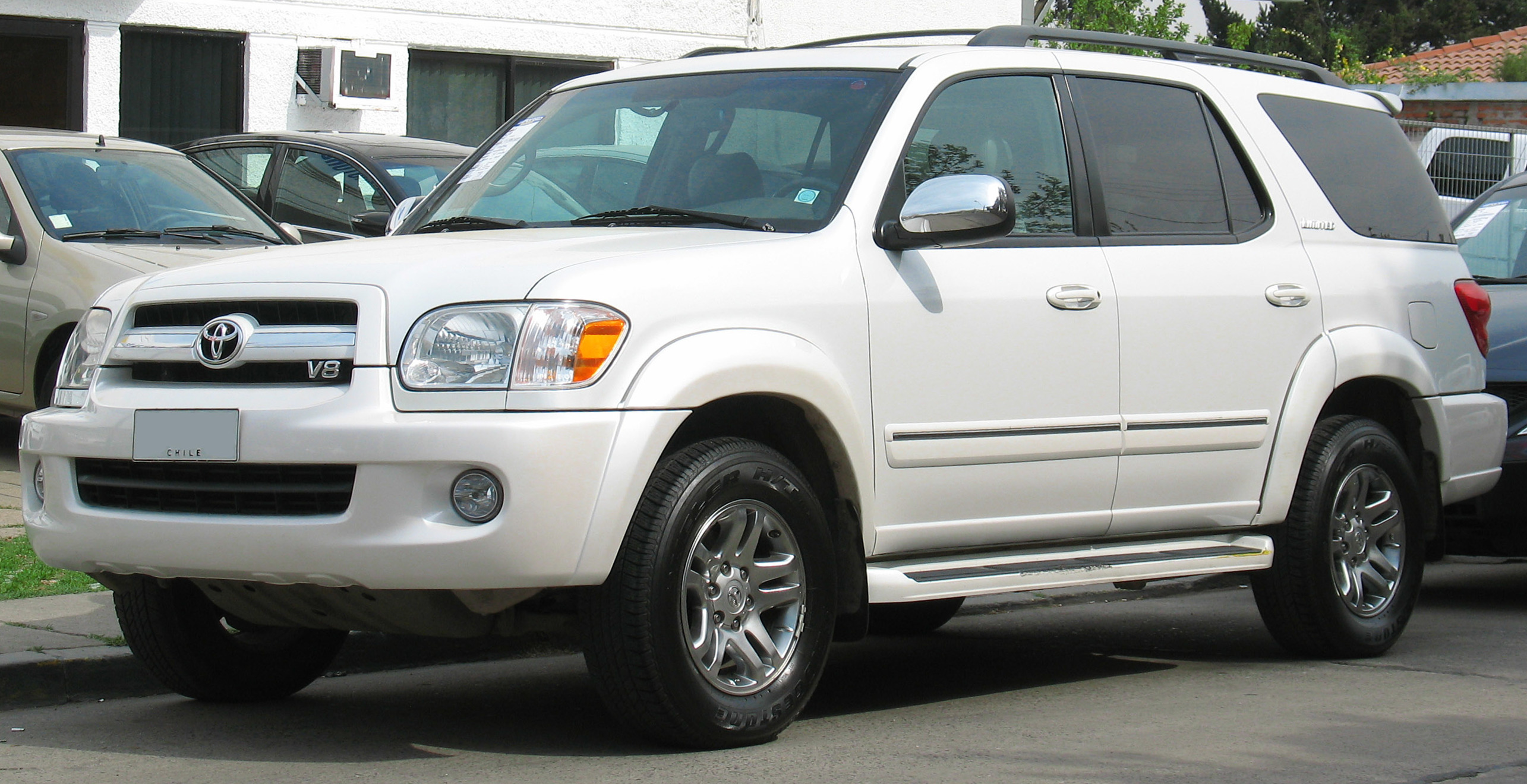
2005–2007 Sequoia Limited, facelift

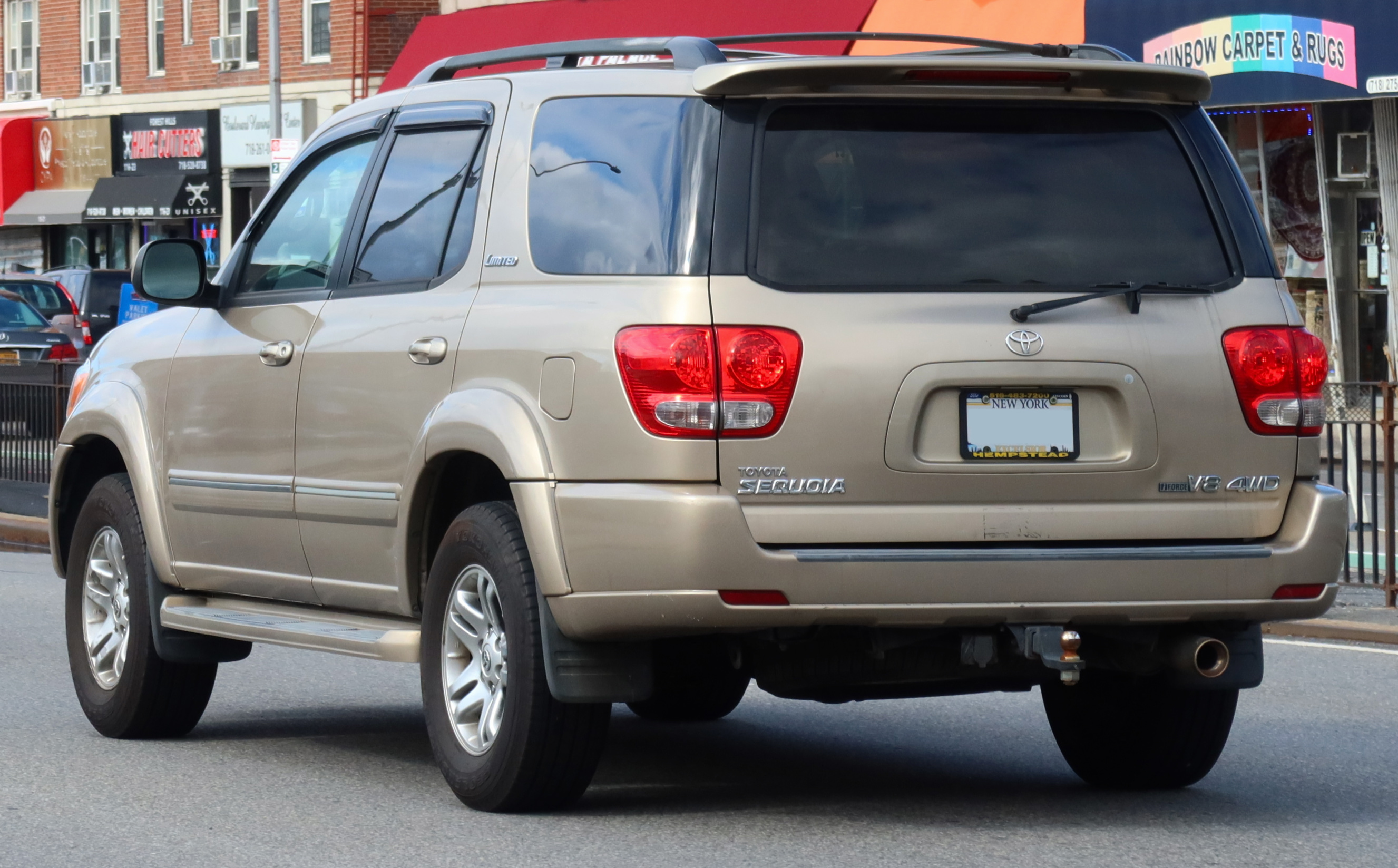
Sequoia Limited, rear, facelift

== Second generation (XK60; 2007) ==
Second generation
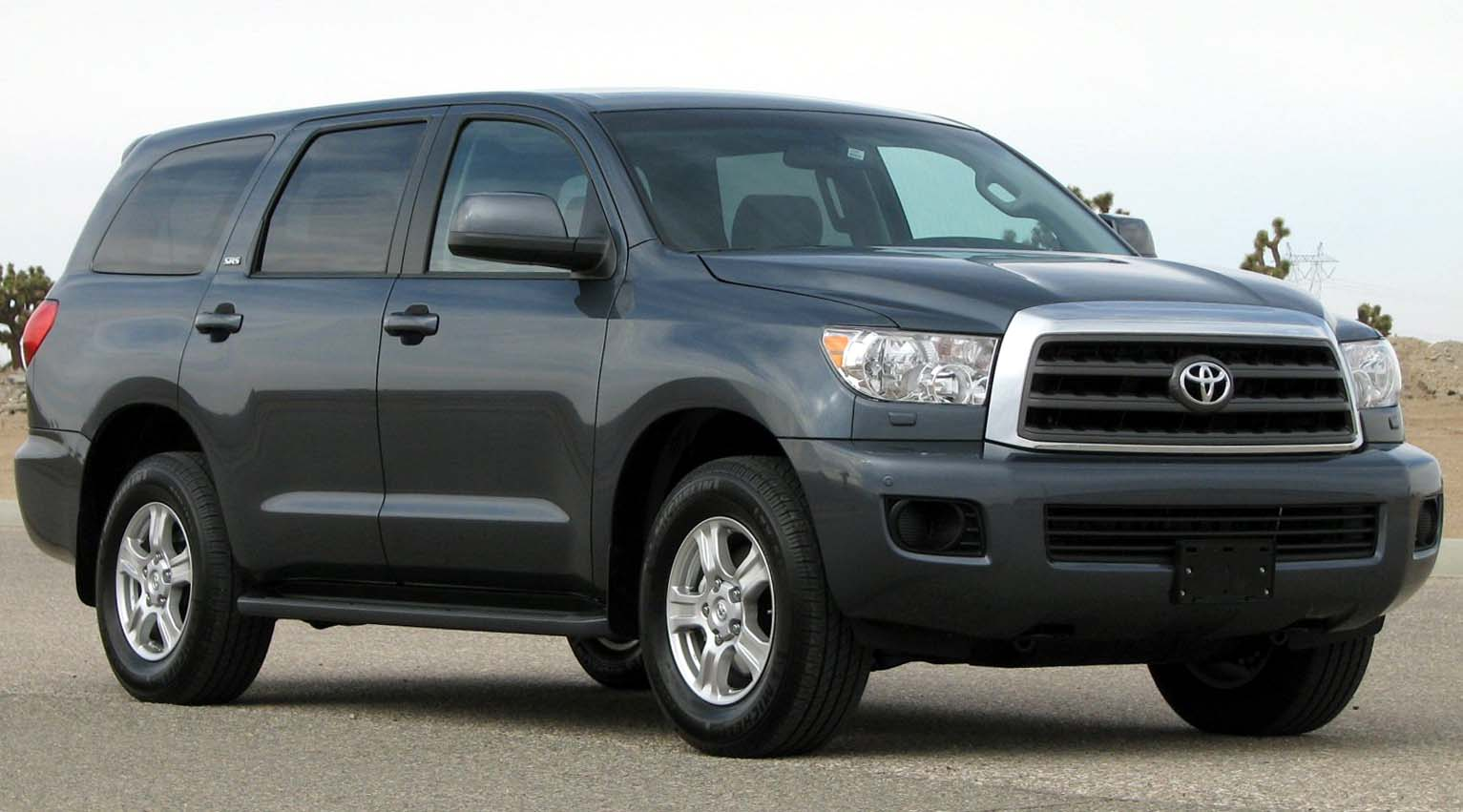

Overview
- Model code: XK60
- Production: November 2007 – March 2022
- Model years: 2008–2022
- Assembly: United States: Princeton, Indiana (TMMI)
- Designer: Takumi Nakamura, Takayasu Furukawa, Hideo Karikomi, Jinichi Sato and Kengo Iwanaga

Body and chassis
- Platform: Toyota F1
- Related: Toyota Tundra (XK50); Toyota Land Cruiser (J200); Lexus LX (J200)

Powertrain
- Engine: Gasoline: 4.6 L 1UR-FE V8 (UPK60/65; 2010–2012); 4.7 L 2UZ-FE VVT-i V8 (UCK60/65; 2008–2009); 5.7 L 3UR-FE V8 (USK60/65; 2008–2022); Gasoline flex-fuel: 5.7 L 3UR-FBE V8 (USK65)
- Power output: 310 hp (231 kW; 314 PS) (1UR-FE); 276 hp (206 kW; 280 PS) (2UZ-FE); 381 hp (284 kW; 386 PS) (3UR-FE/3UR-FBE)
- Transmission: 5-speed automatic; 6-speed automatic

Dimensions
- Wheelbase: 122.0 in (3,099 mm)
- Length: 205.1 in (5,210 mm)
- Width: 79.0–79.9 in (2,007–2,029 mm)
- Height: 77.0 in (1,956 mm)
- Curb weight: 5,730 lb (2,599 kg)

Toyota unveiled the 2008 Sequoia at the November 2007 Los Angeles Auto Show, with sales beginning that following December. Like the original Sequoia, the new model is based on the new Tundra. However major differences with the Tundra include a fully boxed frame, a rear independent suspension featuring double wishbones with coil springs for improved ride comfort and room, and a locking center differential on 4-wheel drive models. The new suspension helps give the Sequoia a tighter turning radius of 19 ft (5.8 m) and allows for a fold-flat rear seat. Toyota stated the new frame is 70 percent more resistant to bending flex with torsional rigidity up 30 percent. However, the new model weighs 500 lb (227 kg) more than the previous Sequoia. The drag coefficient has been reduced to 0.35.

Improvements include an optional ULEV-II compliant 381 horsepower 5.7 L 3UR-FE V8, mated to a 6-speed automatic.

The 2008 Sequoia came in three trim lines: the SR5 and Limited, and new Platinum. The base engine is the previous ULEV compliant 4.7 L 2UZ-FE 276 hp (206 kW) V8 featured from the previous generation. The 4.7 L is standard on the SR5. Some of the earlier 2008 and 2009 SR5 models do come with the 5.7 L as an option when purchasing, while the Limited and Platinum models come standard with a 5.7 L V8 engine. Four-wheel drive is available on all models.

The interior of the 2008 Sequoia features the same dash as the new Tundra. Standard features include a tilt and telescopic steering wheel, power windows and doors, dual sun visors, and a keyless entry. Options include DVD based navigation with backup camera and 7" screen, a rear DVD entertainment system, a 14-speaker JBL audio system, and heated seats with ventilated coolers in the front row and warmers in the second row, available in Platinum trim. The Limited trim includes audio, climate, and hands-free Bluetooth mobile phone system controls, an improved JBL audio system, electroluminescent Optitron gauges, and an electrochromic auto-dimming rear-view mirror and side view mirrors with a HomeLink transceiver. The Platinum model includes a standard DVD navigation with a backup camera, a rear air suspension which can lower for easy loading, and Dynamic Laser Cruise Control.

Seating arrangements are for seven or eight passengers, eight for SR5 and Limited models and seven for Platinum models. Power folding 60/40 split third row seats are available on the Platinum. The Sequoia has a maximum towing capacity of 7,400 lb (3,357 kg) with the 5.7 L V8 in 2WD SR5 form or 7,100 lb (3,221 kg) in the 4WD SR5 trim. For complete trailer & weight capacities, see Toyota's website.

Exterior differences include door handle colors (color-keyed for the SR5; chrome for the Limited and Platinum), diamond-cut 20 in (508 mm) aluminum alloy wheels for the Platinum trim, and varying power-heated remote-controlled side mirrors.

=== Engines ===
Capacity	Model year	Power	Torque
4,608 cc (281.2 cu in) 1UR-FE V8	2010–2012	310 bhp (231 kW) @ 5400 rpm	327 lb⋅ft (443 N⋅m) @ 3400 rpm
4,663 cc (284.6 cu in) 2UZ-FE V8	2008–2009	276 bhp (206 kW) @ 5400 rpm	314 lb⋅ft (426 N⋅m) @ 3400 rpm
5,663 cc (345.6 cu in) 3UR-FE V8	2008–2022	381 bhp (284 kW) @ 5600 rpm	401 lb⋅ft (544 N⋅m) @ 3600 rpm

=== Safety ===
Standard safety features include Vehicle Stability Control, traction control, anti-lock brakes brake assist, electronic brakeforce distribution, front side torso airbags and roll-sensing side curtain airbags for all three rows. For the 2010 model, knee airbags were added as standard feature for front driver and passenger safety.

NHTSA crash test ratings (2008):
Frontal Driver:	5/5 stars
Frontal Passenger:	4/5 stars
Side Driver:	not tested
Side Rear Passenger:	not tested
Rollover:	18.5%

Note: The Sequoia has not been retested for 2010–2016.

In 2015, the Insurance Institute for Highway Safety (IIHS) found the Sequoia 4WD to have the lowest overall driver death rate in its class with 0 deaths per million registered vehicle years.

=== Model year changes ===
- The 2009 model year adds E85 flex fuel capability for the 5.7 L V8 sold in certain states.
- For the 2010 model year the 4.7 L V8 is replaced by an all-new 4.6 L 1UR-FE engine paired to a six-speed automatic transmission. The SR5 and Platinum trims become mono-spec and the Limited grade offers three stand alone options (navigation system, rear-seat entertainment and seven-passenger seating). Front driver and passenger knee airbags were added as a standard feature. Platinum models get wood trim on the steering wheel and shift gear, and Bluetooth and audio controls are standard on the SR5 trim. The Timberland Mica exterior color gets replaced with the new Camry's Spruce Mica. All audio systems have USB connectivity with iPod integration, and the rear-view mirror on the Limited trim has a built-in rear-view camera.
- For the 2012 model year, Toyota's Entune System was added as a standard on SR5, while an upgraded version featuring navigation became an optional feature on Limited and standard on the Platinum trim. Blind Spot Monitoring was optional on the 2012 Platinum model.
- For the 2014 model year, a Blu-ray DVD player became an optional feature on Limited and standard in Platinum.
- No major changes were made for the 2015, 2016 and 2017 model years.
- On February 9, 2017, Toyota unveiled a refreshed Sequoia for the 2018 model year, featuring new standard LED headlights, daytime running lights and foglights, and three new exterior colors: Midnight Black Metallic, Shoreline Blue Pearl and Toasted Walnut Pearl. Each trim level also gets its own specific grille design. It also added a TRD level trim to its returning SR5, Limited, and Platinum trims, an upgraded instrumentation panel, automatic emergency braking and the Toyota Safety Sense feature.
- The 2020 model year Sequoia was updated with a new TRD Pro package designed for off-road capabilities, featuring Apple CarPlay, Android Auto, Toyota Safety Sense-P, aluminum-bodied internal bypass Fox shock absorbers, and a more enhanced grille in line with the TRD Pro branding. Toyota Safety Sense-P includes forward collision warning with automatic braking, lane keeping assist, adaptive cruise control, blind-spot monitoring and rear cross-traffic alert.
- The 2021 Sequoia received a Nightshade Edition, putting it in line with the entire Toyota lineup in North America. This feature, which was introduced at the Chicago Auto Show on February 6, 2020, went on sale in the third quarter of 2020, but was limited to at 2,500 units.

=== Accolades ===
- In a 2008 Motor Trend comparison between several full-size SUVs, the Sequoia took first place.
- The Sequoia is the top vehicle in the US that is most likely to last 200,000 miles according to a 2019 study from iSeeCars.
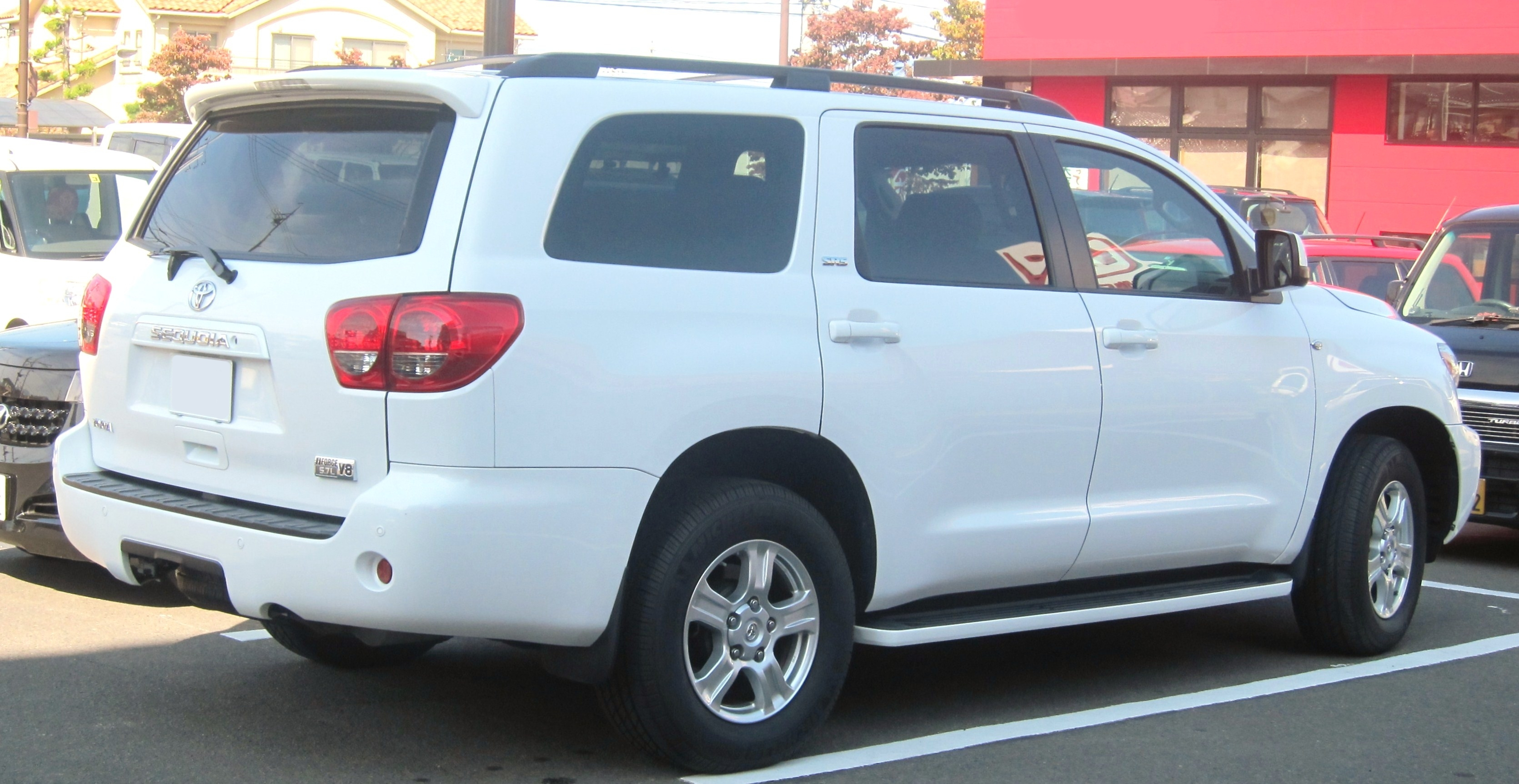
Sequoia SR5, rear, pre-facelift

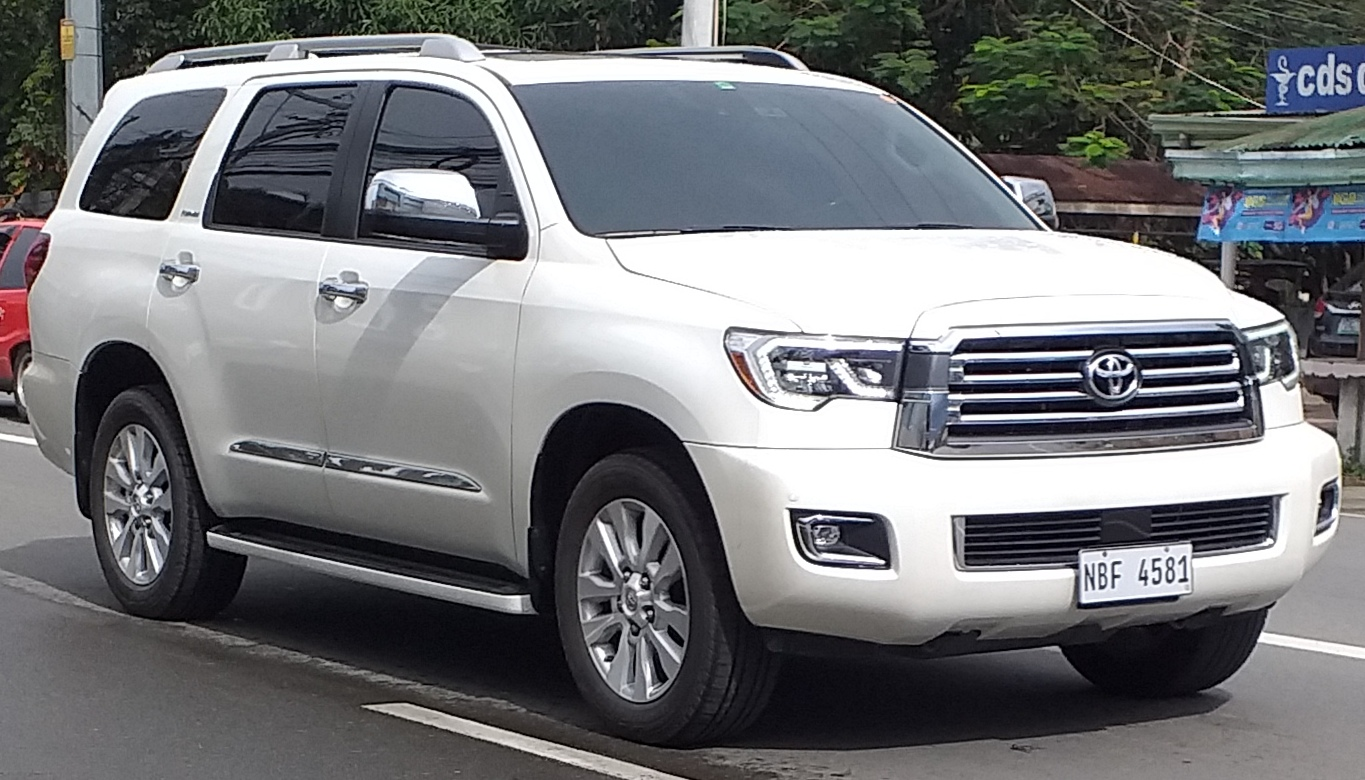
Sequoia, facelift

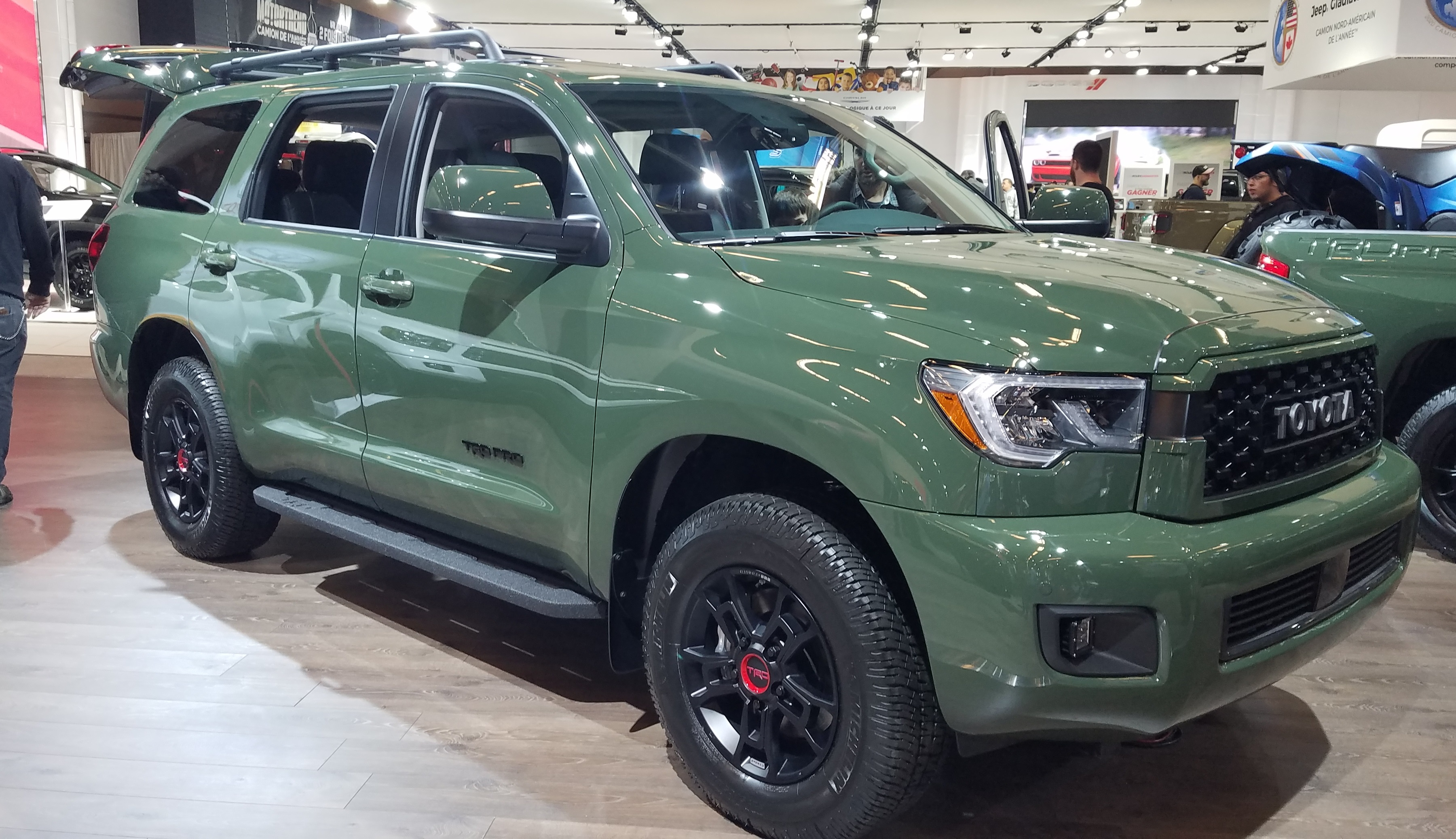
Sequoia TRD Pro

== Third generation (XK80; 2022) ==
Third generation
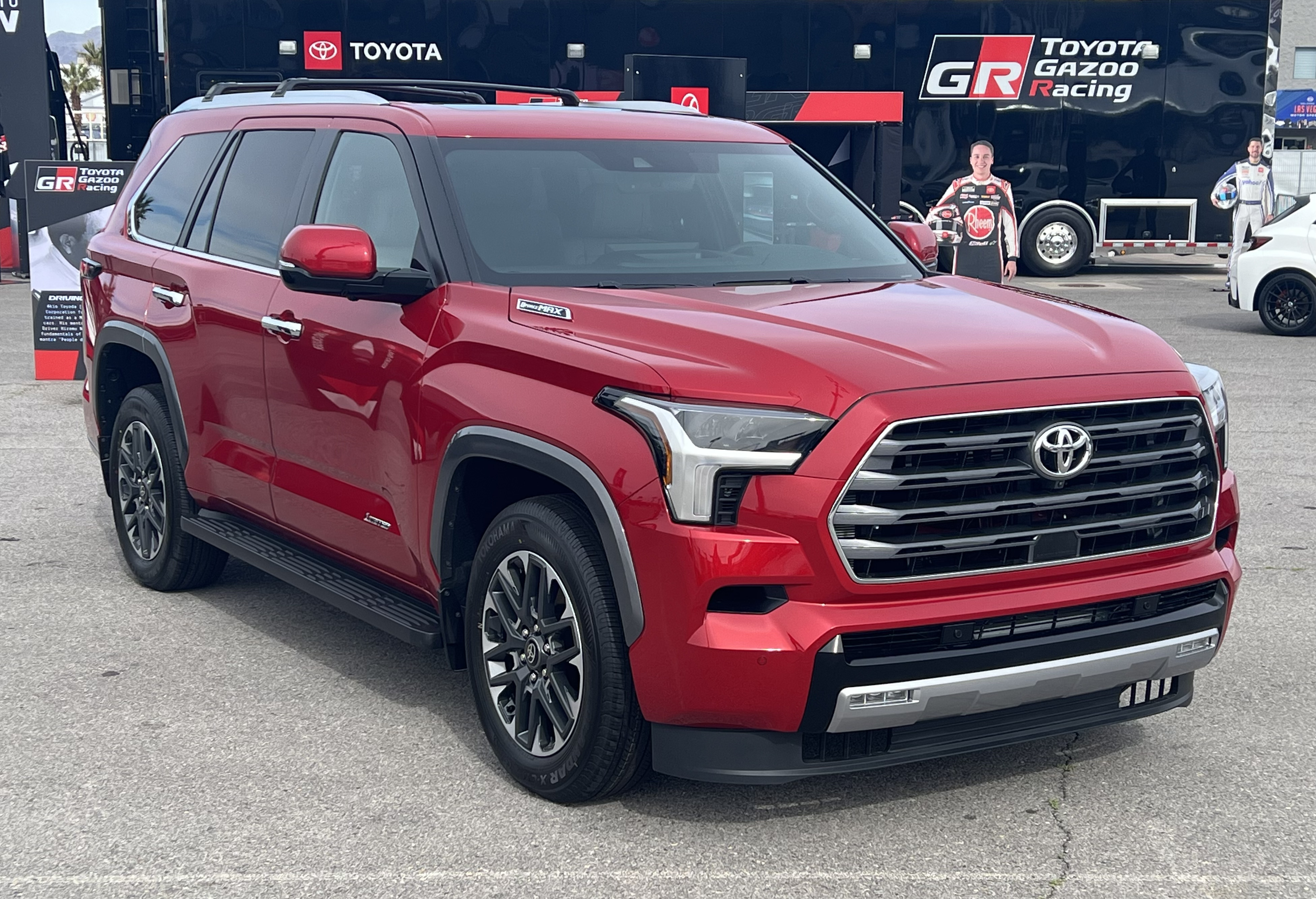
- 2025 Toyota Sequoia Limited

Overview
- Model code: XK80
- Production: September 2022 – present
- Model years: 2023–present
- Assembly: United States: San Antonio, Texas (TMMTX)

Body and chassis
- Platform: TNGA: GA-F
- Related: Toyota Tundra (XK70); Toyota Land Cruiser (J300)/Lexus LX (J310)

Powertrain
- Engine: Gasoline hybrid: 3.4 L V35A-FTS twin-turbo V6 (VXKH80/85)
- Electric motor: 36 kW (48 hp; 49 PS) L4A0 AC permanent magnet synchronous
- Power output: 437 hp (326 kW; 443 PS) (combined)
- Transmission: 10-speed AWR10L65 "ECTi Direct Shift" automatic
- Hybrid drivetrain: Parallel (i-Force Max)
- Battery: 1.87 kWh, 6.5 Ah, 288 V NiMH

Dimensions
- Wheelbase: 122.0 in (3,099 mm)
- Length: 208.1 in (5,286 mm)
- Width: 79.6 in (2,022 mm)
- Height: 74.2–77.7 in (1,885–1,974 mm)
- Curb weight: 5,620–6,185 lb (2,549–2,805 kg)

The third-generation Sequoia was unveiled on January 25, 2022, for the 2023 model year. Production began on September 21, 2022, and sales began in October 2022. The production was moved to the San Antonio plant, built alongside the XK70 series Tundra due to the Indiana facility preparing to build two upcoming passenger SUVs, the eight-seat Toyota Grand Highlander and the seven-seat Lexus TX.

It is built on the body-on-frame GA-F platform. Like the first generation, this generation uses a solid rear axle instead of independent setup from the previous generation. A hybrid 3.4-liter V35A-FTS twin-turbo V6 engine (marketed as "i-Force Max") is standard across the lineup, producing 437 hp (326 kW; 443 PS) and 790 N⋅m (583 lb⋅ft) of torque, with the 5.7-liter 3UR-FE V8 unit being discontinued.

The third-generation Sequoia is available in five trim levels, four of which are carried over from the previous generation: SR5, Limited, Platinum, and TRD Pro, as well as the flagship Capstone luxury-oriented trim. Towing capacity is rated at 9,300–9,520 pounds (4,220–4,320 kg), depending on the trim level. Depending on trims, the Sequoia is available with either a seven or eight passenger seating, with either a split bench or dual captain's chairs in the second row.

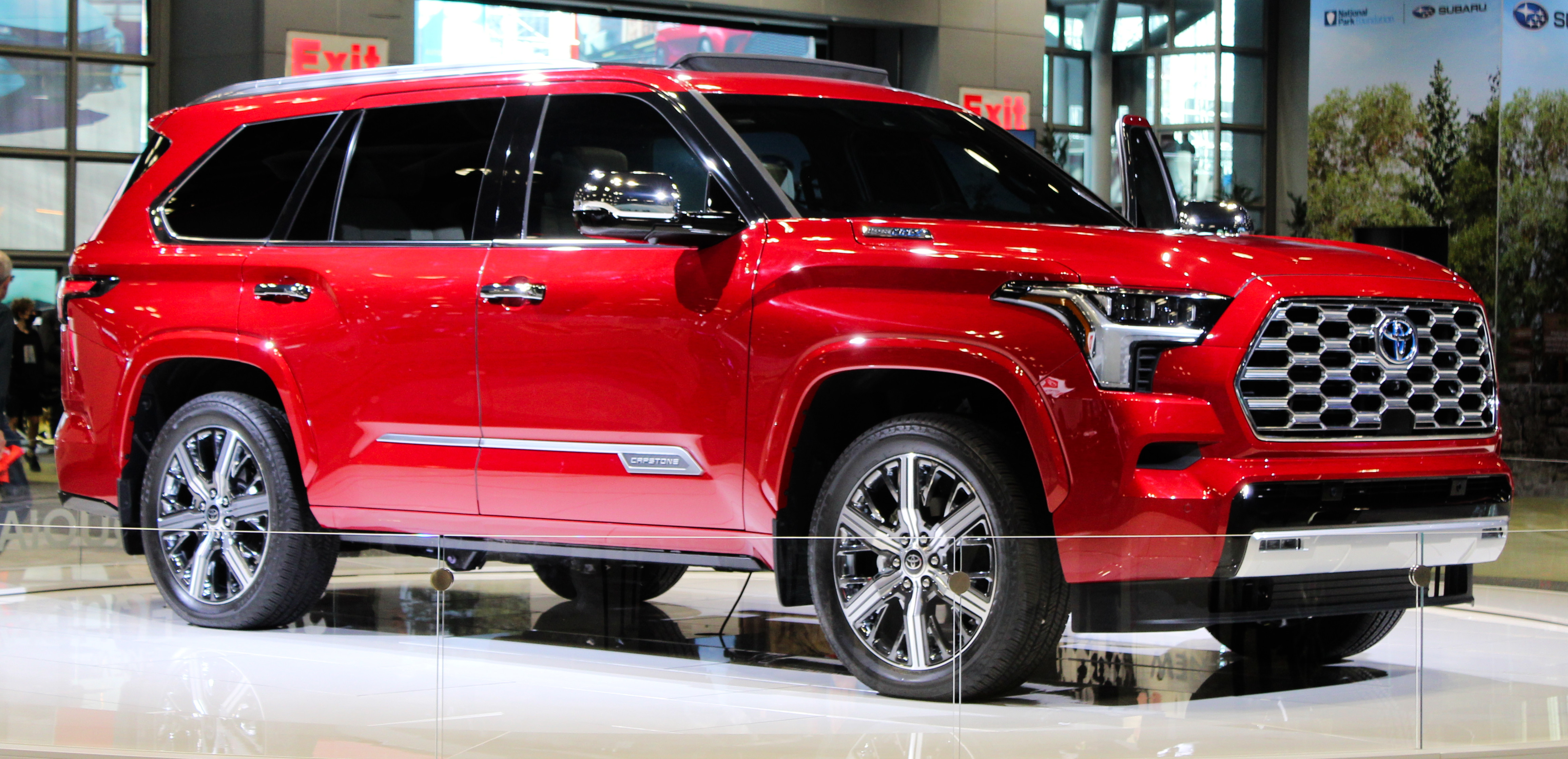
Sequoia Capstone front view

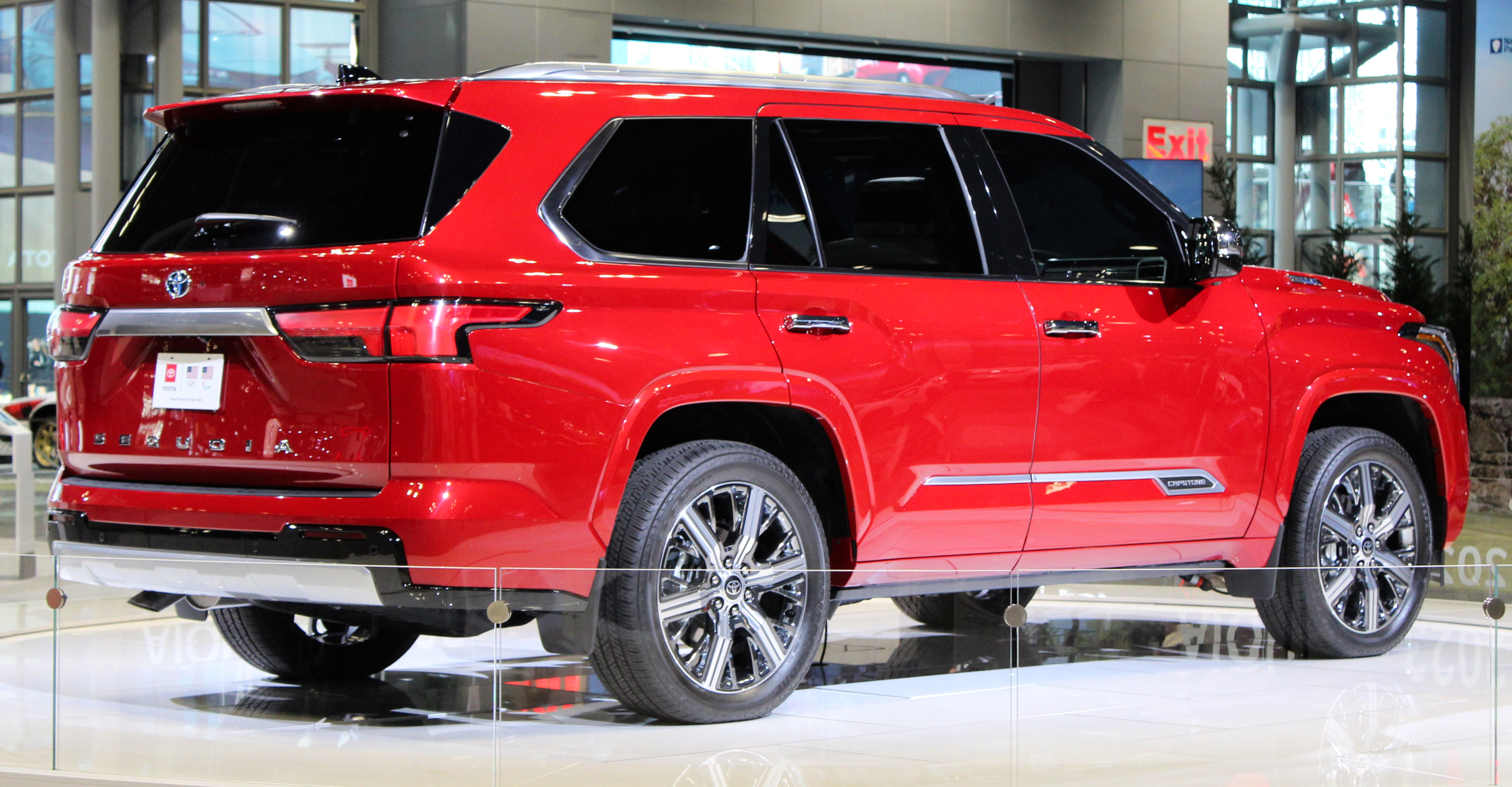
Sequoia Capstone rear view

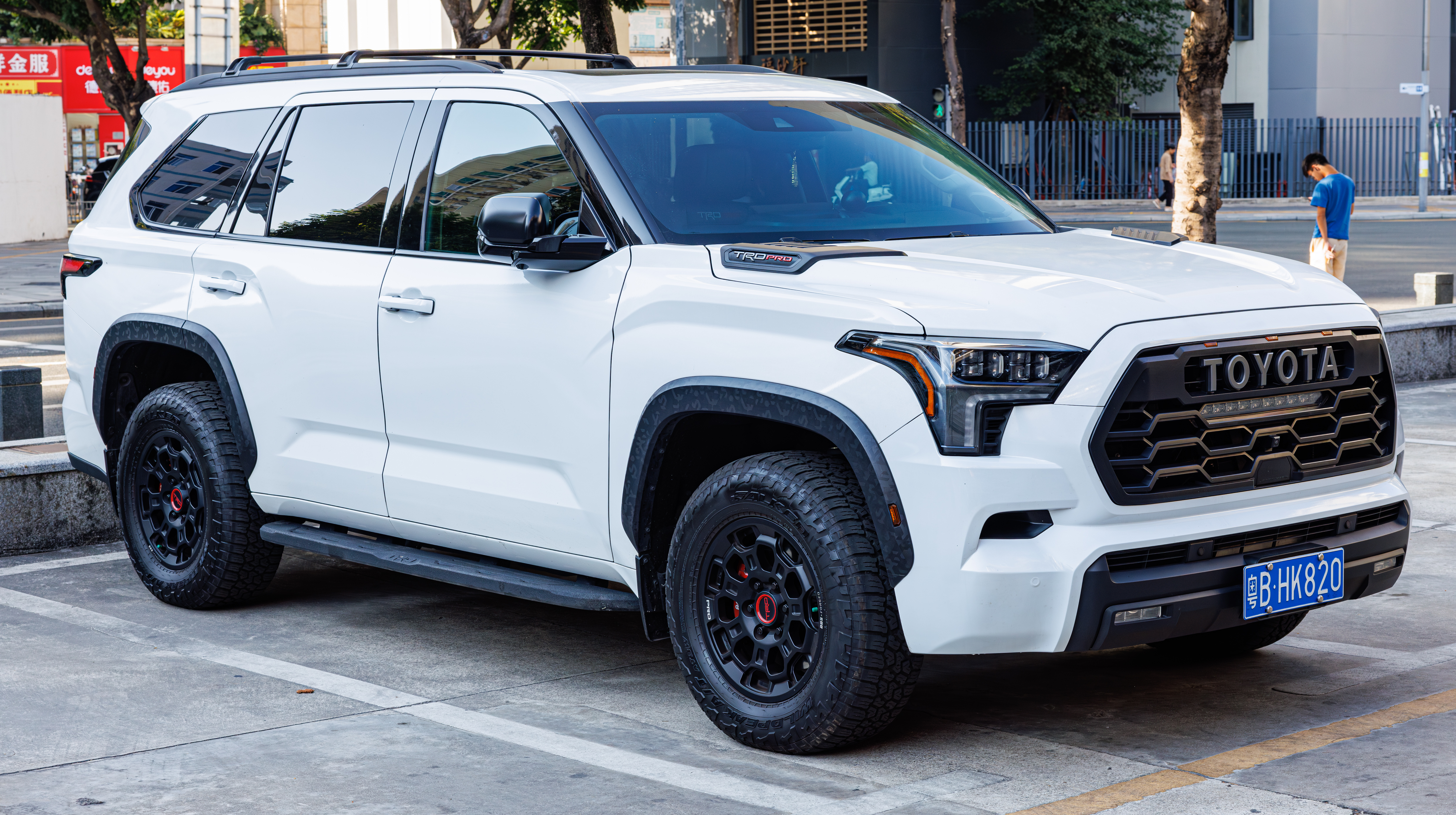
Sequoia TRD Pro

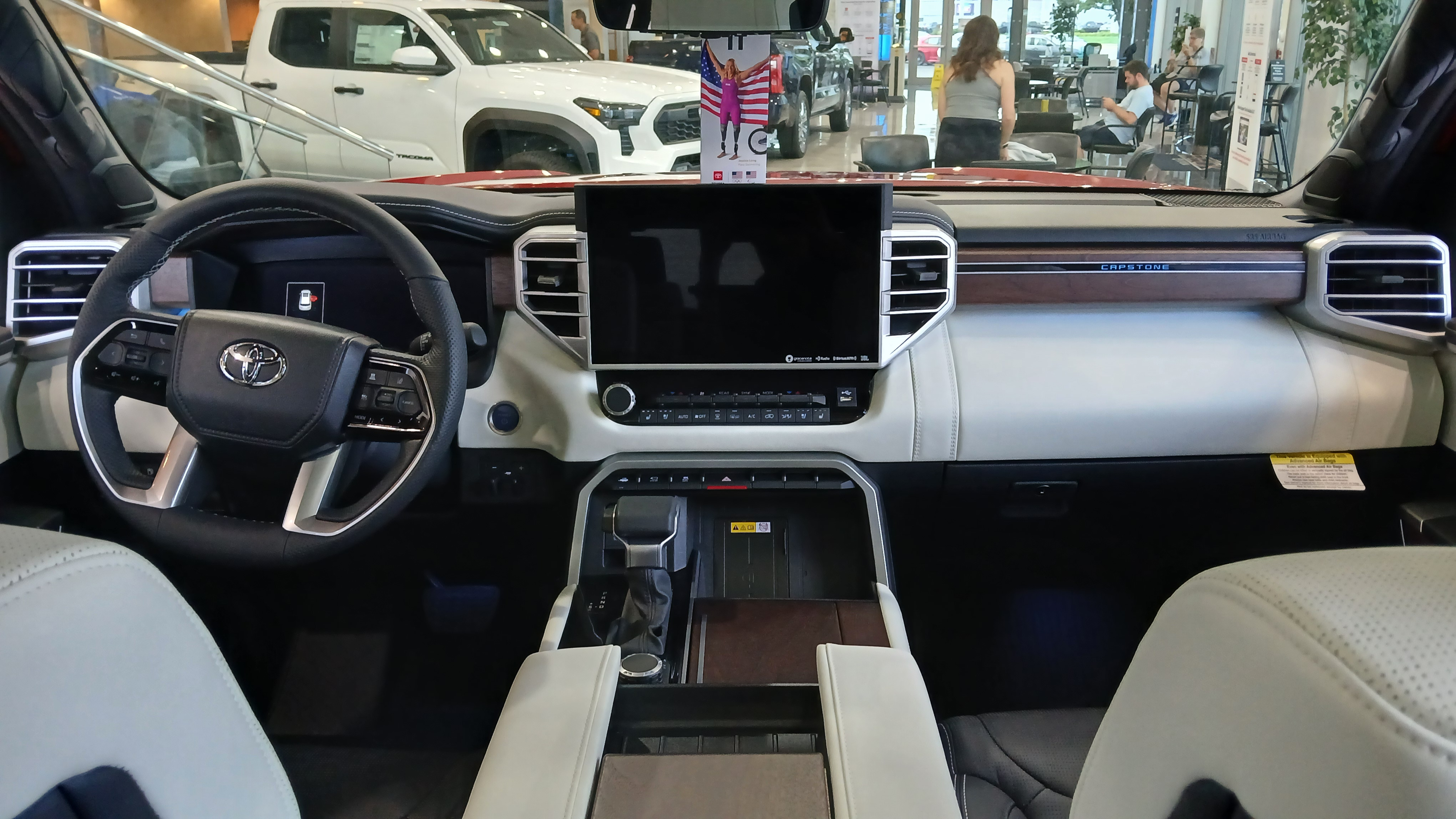
Interior

=== Model year changes ===
==== 2024 ====
- A new "Terra" color became available only for the TRD Pro trim.
- The Limited trim became available with the Nightshade package.
- The Platinum trim became available with the TRD Off-Road package.

==== 2025 ====
- A new "Mudbath" color was available only for the TRD Pro trim.
- A towing technology package was introduced as a standard feature on Platinum, 1794 Edition, TRD Pro, and Capstone and as an option on SR5 and Limited. This package includes a Trailer Backup Guide to assist in backing up with a trailer attached and Straight Path Assist to avoid the trailer from veering off direction while backing up. Also available is a wireless trailer camera system that can be attached to the back of a trailer and stream live footage to the digital rear view mirror.
- Massaging seats were added as a standard feature on the Platinum, 1794 Edition, and Capstone trims. The massagers can be controlled via the center touchscreen.
- The Western-oriented "1794 Edition" trim was added to the Sequoia lineup between the Platinum and Capstone trims. It is a tribute to the land the factory was built on, which was originally home to a ranch established in the year 1794. Standard features include American walnut interior trim with an open-pore finish, Saddle Tan leather seat trim, heated and ventilated front seats and second-row captain chairs, a panoramic sunroof, a towing technology package, and 20-inch alloy wheels.

==== 2027 ====
- Facelift.
- A "Trailhunter" package for SR5 trim was introduced.
- Standard 14-inch screen for Toyota Audio Multimedia System.
- Standard Toyota Safety Sense 4.0.

== Sales ==
Calendar year	US	Canada
2000	9,925	n/a
2001	68,574	n/a
2002	70,187	n/a
2003	67,067	n/a
2004	58,114	562
2005	45,904	477
2006	34,315	377
2007	23,273	195
2008	30,693	842
2009	16,387	800
2010	13,848	912
2011	13,022	733
2012	13,151	744
2013	13,811	744
2014	11,806	713
2015	12,583	633
2016	12,771	697
2017	12,156	755
2018	11,121	684
2019	10,289	543
2020	7,364	384
2021	8,070	418
2022	5,314	
2023	22,182	
2024	26,097	
2025	26,186	

== Recall history ==
=== First generation (2001–2007) ===
Early 2003 Sequoias were recalled to reprogram the Vehicle Stability Control system due to the possibility of poor acceleration at certain low speeds.

The 2002–2007 Sequoia model years had a defect in the front suspension lower ball joints. The lower ball joints may experience excessive wear due to inadequate hardness of the ball joint housing, which may result in catastrophic separation of the lower ball joint.

Recently, the Sequoia, along with the Tacoma and Tundra, have another recall due to the frame prematurely rusting. If there is a 10 mm perforation found on the frame, the vehicle frame will be replaced, if the service is done within 12 years of vehicle purchase or 1 year after recall became official. For those vehicles without 10 mm perforation and located in a cold weather state, Toyota will perform an undercoating service to prevent future rust from forming.

2002–2007 Sequoias were subject to the Takata Airbag recall. Affected owners can have their vehicle's airbags replaced for free by a Toyota dealership.

=== Second generation (2008–2022) ===
The 2008–2010 Sequoias were part of one of the 2009-2010 Toyota recalls that required the installation of a small shim to relieve unwanted friction and restore fluidity to the accelerator pedal.

=== Third generation (2023–present) ===
On October 1, 2025, Toyota issued a recall for certain 2023–2025 Sequoia models with faulty backup cameras. A software error may cause the center multimedia display to show a half-green, full-green, or full-black image (instead of the rearview camera feed) when the vehicle is placed in reverse. To correct the error, Toyota dealers will update the multimedia display software at no cost to the owner.
