= Toyota T100 =

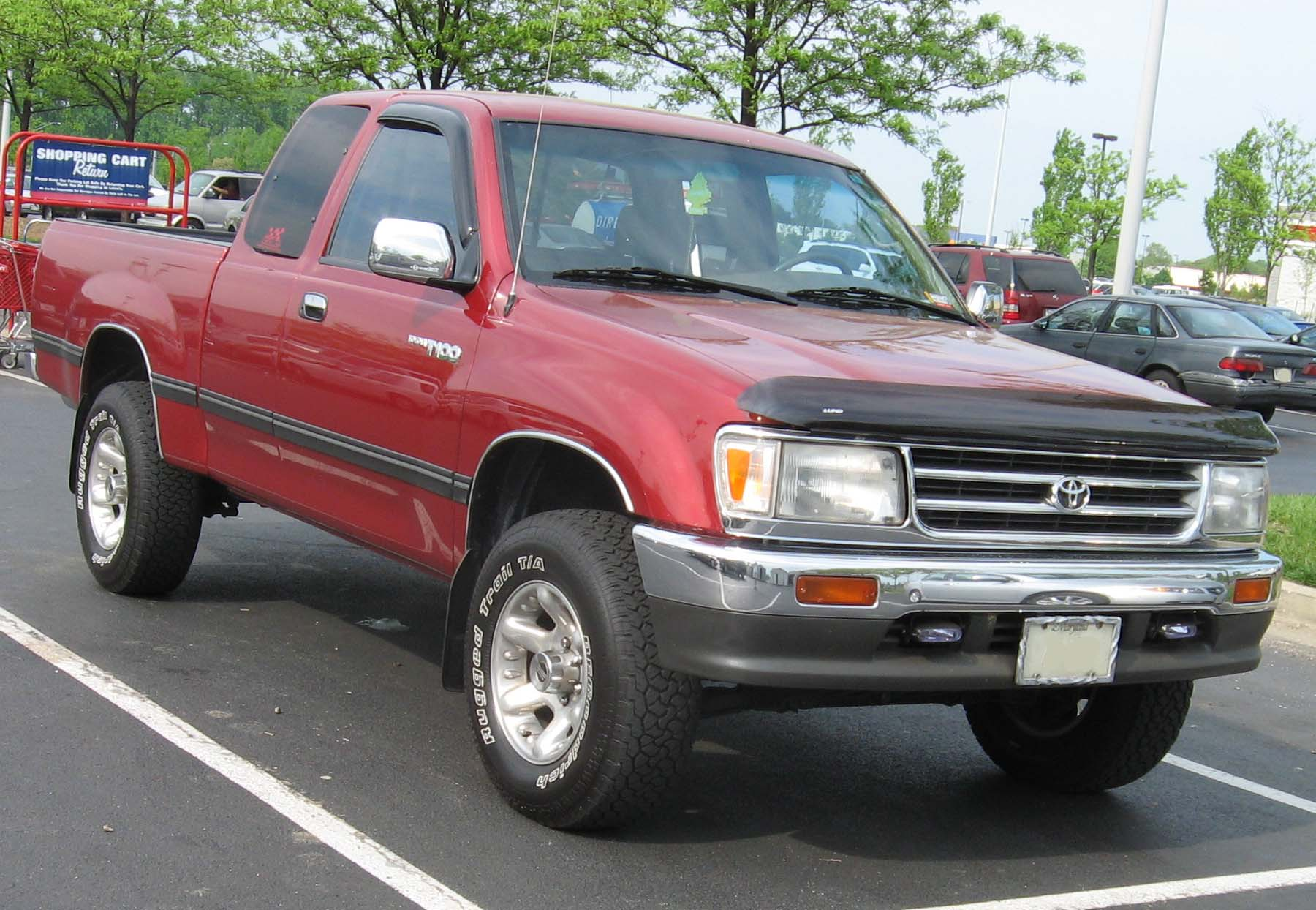
- Toyota T100 4WD Xtracab (XK20)

Overview
- Manufacturer: Toyota
- Model code: XK10 (2WD); XK20 (4WD)
- Also called: Toyota Grandlux (Middle East)
- Production: August 1992 – July 1998
- Model years: 1993–1998
- Assembly: Japan: Hamura, Tokyo (Hino)

Body and chassis
- Class: Full-size pickup truck
- Body style: 2-door regular cab; 2-door extended cab
- Layout: Front-engine, rear-wheel-drive; Front-engine, four-wheel-drive
- Related: Toyota Truck (N80/90/100/110); Toyota Hilux (N140/150/160/170); Toyota 4Runner/Hilux Surf (N120/130)

Powertrain
- Engine: Gasoline: 2.7 L 3RZ-F I4 DOHC (RCK10, Middle East); 2.7 L 3RZ-FE I4 DOHC (RCK10); 3.0 L 3VZ-E V6 SOHC (VCK10/20); 3.4 L 5VZ-FE V6 DOHC (VCK11/21)
- Power output: 141 hp (105 kW; 143 PS) (3RZ-F); 150 hp (112 kW; 152 PS) (3RZ-FE/3VZ-E); 190 hp (142 kW; 193 PS) (5VZ-FE)
- Transmission: 5-speed R150/R150F manual; 4-speed A340E/A340F automatic

Dimensions
- Wheelbase: 121.8 in (3,094 mm)
- Length: 209.1 in (5,311 mm)
- Width: 75.2 in (1,910 mm)
- Height: 66.7–68.6 in (1,694–1,742 mm) (2WD); 70.1–72.6 in (1,781–1,844 mm) (4WD)
- Curb weight: 3,350–3,580 lb (1,520–1,624 kg) (2WD); 3,845–4,110 lb (1,744–1,864 kg) (4WD)

Chronology
- Successor: Toyota Tundra

The Toyota T100 is a full-size pickup truck manufactured and marketed by Toyota for model years 1993–1998 for the United States and Canada over a single generation; it was intended and designed specifically for the North American market.

Other than in the United States and Canada, the T100 truck was also sold in the Middle East as the Toyota Grandlux between 1993 and 1996.

== History ==
As Toyota established itself in the North American compact pickup truck market in the 1980s through 1990s, the company offered a truck that was larger than the compact as an alternative to the traditional North American full-size pickup truck market. North American Toyota dealers had long been requesting a full-sized Toyota truck, especially in light of the high percentage of Truck owners who moved on to domestic full-sized trucks. The T100 reflected a philosophy of designing products specifically for localized international markets, where traditional products sold and made in Japan would not sell well. This approach is also demonstrated with the introduction of the mid-size Camry (XV10) which was larger than the compact Camry (V30) in 1991, and again in 1997 when the Sienna replaced the slow selling Previa.

Rumored for many years before, the 1993 Toyota T100 featured a full-size (8 ft) pickup bed, retaining the engine and suspension setup of its smaller and older sibling, the compact Truck. Although the T100 was a bit larger than the competitive mid-size Dodge Dakota, it was still slightly smaller than some full-size American pickup trucks of the time, thus occupying a niche in the truck market. Before introducing the T100, the company reflected on its history of commercial truck manufacture and products they offered in the past. Past products started with the G1, the FA, the BX, the Stout, the ToyoAce, and the Dyna, and its market successes with their Hino Division. Though economical, reliable, and practical, the T100 was slow to be accepted by traditional buyers of full-size competitors, while it was larger than both the Truck followed by the Tacoma compact trucks. Wary of the market pushback of competing directly with the Big Three, Toyota chose this somewhat smaller size (and limited lineup) so as not to risk blowback and import quotas.

Although sales were slow at the start, the T100 sales did reach into the mid 40,000 vehicles sold range (1996) in the United States. Sales of the Chevrolet C/K were roughly 700,000 per year, while sales of the Ford F-Series surged from 550,000 to nearly 850,000 and Dodge from 100,000 to 400,000 with the introduction of the new Dodge Ram in 1993. Sales of the T100 fell approximately 30 percent when the new Ram went on the market in October 1993, 11 months after the T100's launch in November 1992.

== Design ==
When it was introduced, the T100 had one cab configuration, a regular cab, and one available engine, a 3.0 L V6 engine with 150 hp (112 kW) and 180 lb⋅ft (244 N⋅m) of torque. In 1993, a 2.7 L inline-four engine with 150 hp (112 kW) - same as for the 3.0 L V6 - and 177 lb⋅ft (240 N⋅m) of torque was added in the hopes new buyers would be drawn in with promises of greater fuel economy and a lower price than on the initial offerings. The T100 was the first imported pickup truck that could carry a 4 by 8 feet plywood sheet between the wheelwells. The regular cab could seat three abreast in the front bench seat; this was split on the SR5 model. Automatics received a column shift while manuals were floor mounted, where the transfer case shifter was also located on 4WD models.

For the 1995 model year, Toyota made several significant upgrades to the T100. The biggest addition being the all-new 190 hp (142 kW) and 220 lb⋅ft (298 N⋅m) of torque 3.4 L 5VZ-FE V6. An Xtracab model came along several months into the 1995 model year as well, with Toyota announcing the launch on December 12, 1994. The XtraCab sits on the same 209.1 in (5,311 mm) wheelbase with a 6.25 ft (1.9 m) bed. This provided a boost in sales of 150 percent for 1995.. The Xtracab added 21.4 cu ft (606 L) of interior room, comparable in size to the Ford F-150.

The T100 received only minor changes throughout its run, aside from the engine changes and the Xtracab addition. A driver-side airbag was installed for MY 1994 (a passenger-side airbag never became available), and larger 16-inch wheels became the norm for most of the 4WD models starting in 1996. As early as September 11, 1995, Toyota announced they would begin producing the T100 in the United States at an all-new plant in Indiana beginning in late 1998 or early 1999 and that it would also include a V8 Engine. T100 test mules were spotted that were suspected to be testing the new V8 engine, which ultimately became the 2UZ-FE. The T100 name was expected to continue, but Toyota announced in August 1998 that their next generation Full-size Pickup Truck would be named the Toyota Tundra.

Toyota Racing Development (TRD) introduced a supercharger for the 3.4 L V6 engine in 1996 and it became available for the T100, the Tacoma and the 4Runner with the 3.4 L V6 (and later the Tundra). Horsepower jumped to the 260 hp (194 kW) range (depending on the generation of the supercharger) and 250 lb⋅ft (339 N⋅m) to 265 lb⋅ft (359 N⋅m) of torque. This power add on was available for 1997–1998 T100s only. Earlier 3.4 L V6 powered T100s have different computer and electrical layouts which do not support the TRD device.

The T100 was manufactured and partially engineered by Toyota-subsidiary Hino. Three trim lines were offered: the base model, the DX, and the top-of-the-line SR5. The maximum towing capacity was 5,200 lb (2,360 kg) and the truck had a payload limit of 2,450 lb (1,110 kg). Although most trucks fell within the 1/2 ton category, a 1-ton model was offered (in 2WD form) for several of its earlier years until finally being dropped because of a lack of interest.

All T100s were assembled in Tokyo, Japan and as a result were subject to a 25% import tariff on all imported light trucks in the United States. This tariff, along with limited plant capacity of 40,000 units per year, severely impacted Toyota's ability to compete in the Full-size Truck market and hampered sales. As a result, the T100 was the last Japanese-built Toyota pickup made for North America when production ceased in July 1998, sales being phased out in August and ending with the 1998 model year. The T100 was replaced by the larger V8-powered Tundra which debuted in 1999. Toyota had originally planned to continue the T100 naming system by calling the new truck the "Toyota T-150"; Ford made a successful claim that this was a trademark infringement of their F-150 and the name had to be changed.

The Middle Eastern market Toyota Grandlux (Standard and SR5) was offered only as a 2WD 1-ton standard cab model, powered by a carbureted 2.7 L inline-four engine and mated exclusively to a five-speed manual transmission.

=== Year-by-year changes ===
MY 1993

- Standard cab, long bed only
- 3.0 L V6 engine only (150 horsepower – 180 lb⋅ft (240 N⋅m) of torque)

MY 1994

- Driver's side airbag added
- DX trim level introduced, between the base Standard and SR5 trims.
- 2.7 L I4 3RZ-FE engine added to lineup (150 horsepower – 177 lb⋅ft (240 N⋅m) of torque)

MY 1995

- 3.4 L V6 5VZ-FE engine added to lineup (190 horsepower – 220 lb⋅ft (300 N⋅m) of torque)
- 3.0 L V6 3VZ-E discontinued
- Xtracab model added to lineup
- Last year for the regular cab 4WD model
- Last year for the regular cab V6.

MY 1996

- Color changes
- DX trim tailgate decal removes "DX" but trim level remains.
- Last year for Blue interior option.

MY 1997

- Larger 16-inch wheel added to lineup
- Blue interior discontinued.
- Medium Grey interior superseded to Moon Mist grey.
- New interior fabric patterns
- DX trim is no longer marketed, but functionally remains a mid-grade option but now includes packages to include power windows, mirrors, and locks.
- Bucket seats are now optional on SR5 trim.
- Color changes
- TRD introduces 3.4 L V6 supercharger (approx. 245 horsepower – 285 lb⋅ft (386 N⋅m) of torque)

MY 1998

- Last year for the T100
- Color changes

== Reception ==
On introduction, the T100's size and V6 engine became points of criticism, with limited appeal to buyers of full-size work trucks and noticebly lacking an optional extended cab or V8 engine. Its only available engine was a 3.0 L V6 shared with Toyota's compact truck and 4Runner models. Toyota said these factor were considered in the design, saying the smaller size offered a larger truck with a compact "feel", an Xtracab was on the horizon and the 3.0 liter V6 would provide far better fuel economy than its market rivals. Both the V6 engine and the somewhat smaller dimensions were influenced by relevant environmental concerns.

The T100 received J.D. Power and Associates Initial Quality Survey "Best Full-Size Pickup" award; the "Best of What's New" award by Popular Science magazine in its first year on the market; and was the first vehicle – car or truck – ever to receive an "Initial Quality Survey Award" in its first year of production. For 1994 (the truck's second model year) and 1995 (the third), the T100 was received the "Best Full-Size Pickup in Initial Quality" by J.D. Power and Associates. In 1997 the T100 received "Top Three Vehicles in Initial Quality – Full-Size Segment" by J.D. Power and Associates.

== Gallery ==
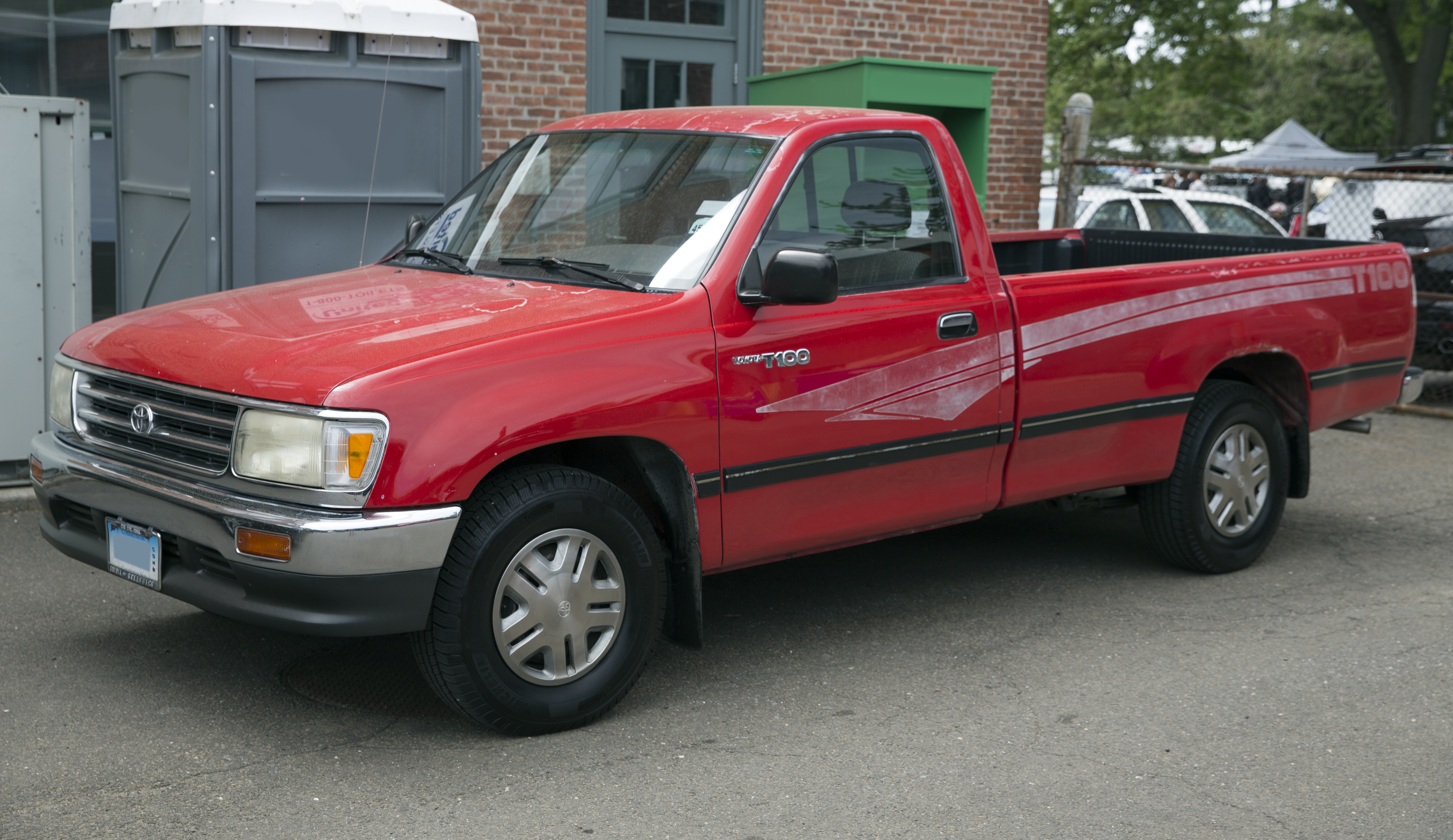
Toyota T100 DX 2WD standard cab (XK10)

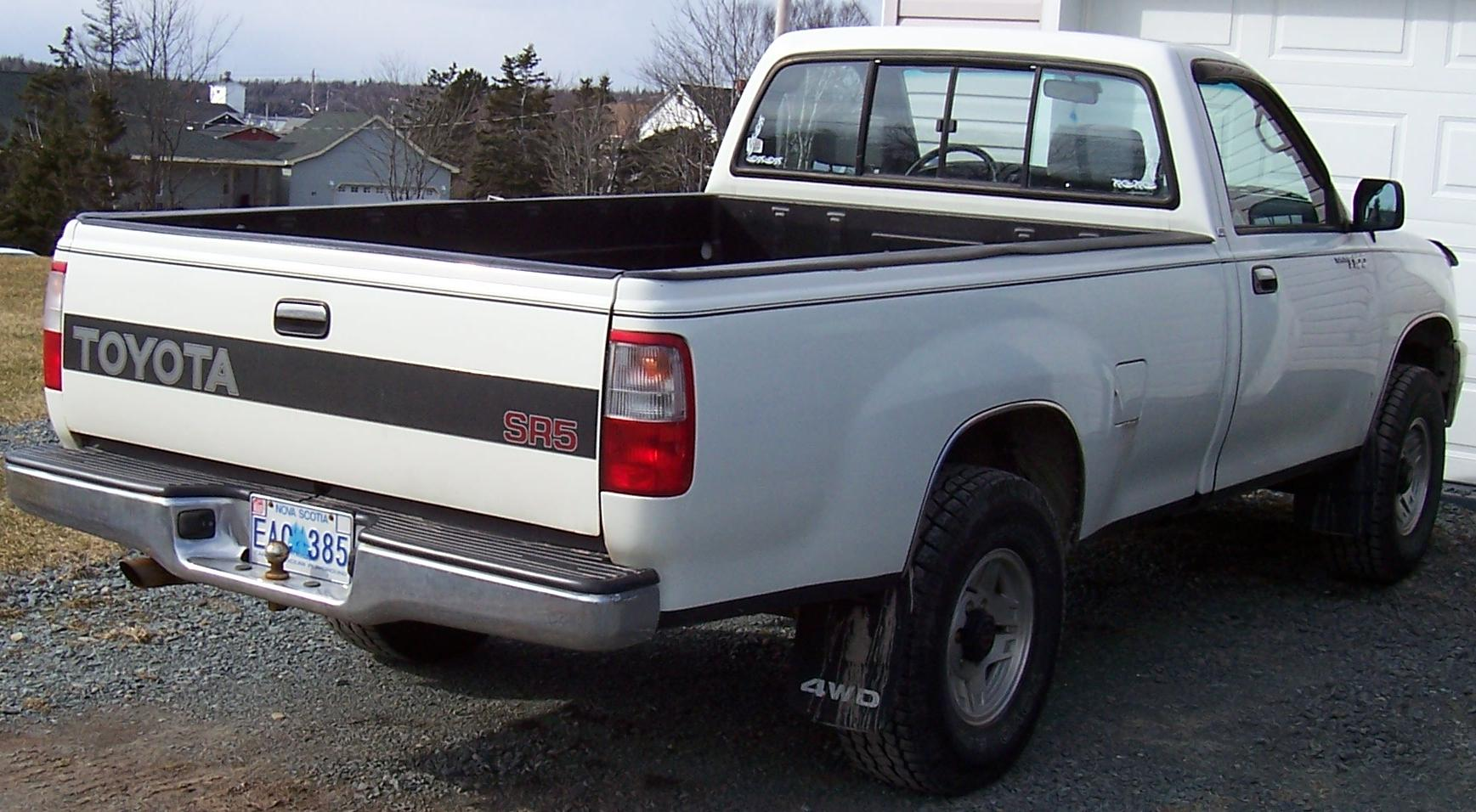
Toyota T100 SR5 4WD standard cab (XK20)

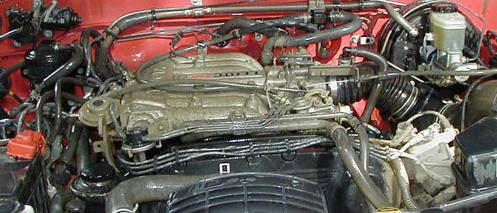
T100 3.0 L V6 engine – available from 1992 to 1994

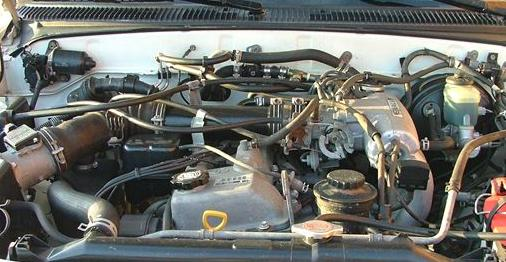
T100 2.7 L inline-four engine – available from 1993 to 1998

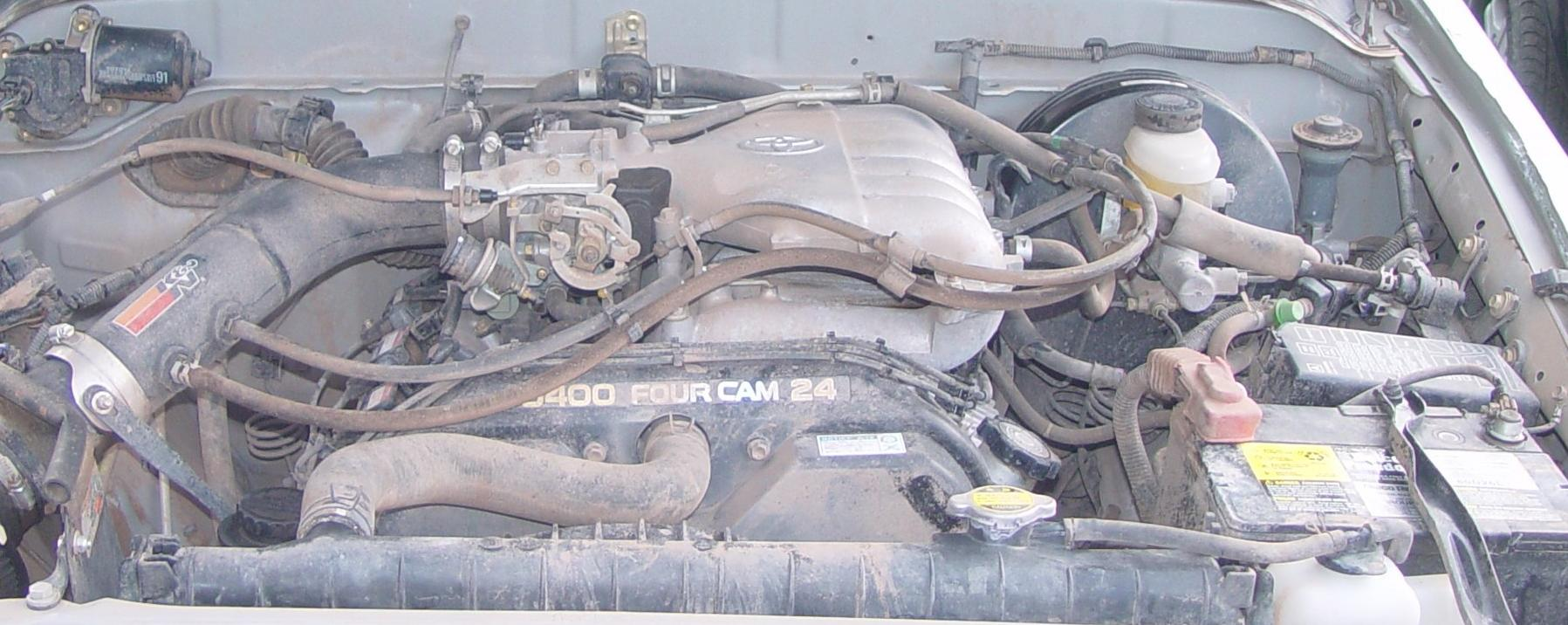
T100 3.4 L V6 engine – available from 1994 to 1998

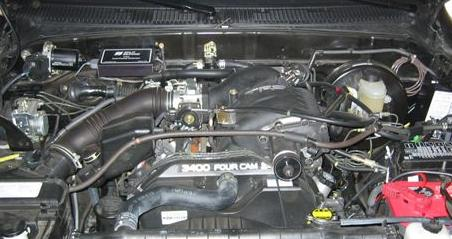
T100 supercharged 3.4 L V6 engine – available from 1996 to 1998

== See also ==
- List of Toyota vehicles
- List of Toyota engines
- List of Toyota transmissions
- List of Toyota factories
- List of Toyota model codes
