= Toyota Racing Development =

In-house tuning shop for Toyota-brand automobiles

- Type: Subsidiary
- Industry: Automotive
- Parent: Toyota

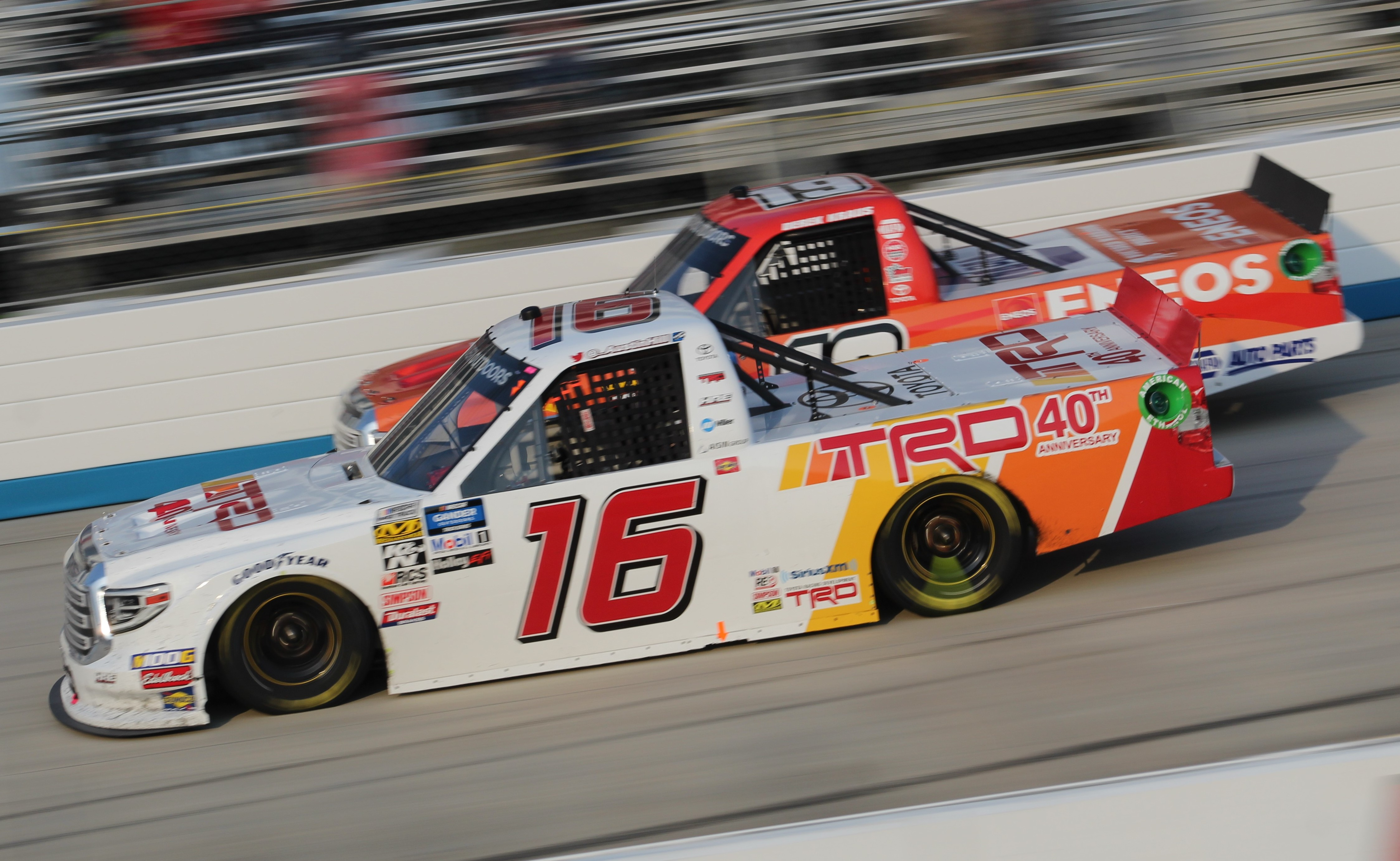
Austin Hill driving a Toyota Tundra at the 2019 JEGS 200.

Toyota Racing Development (also known by its abbreviation TRD) is the in-house tuning shop for all Toyota and Lexus (and formerly Scion) cars. TRD is responsible both for improving street cars for more performance and supporting Toyota's racing interests around the world. TRD produces various tuning products and accessories, including performance suspension components, superchargers, and wheels. TRD parts are available through Toyota dealers, and are also available as accessories on brand-new Toyotas and Scions. Performance parts for Lexus vehicles are now labeled as F-Sport and performance Lexus models are labeled F to distinguish Lexus's F division from TRD.

As of June 2013 there are two official branches of TRD: TRD Japan (a.k.a. Toyota Technocraft) and TRD USA. Each of these branches has both a performance tuning division and a race (or competition) division. In 2018, TRD Japan and Toyota Modellista merged to form Toyota Customizing & Development Co., Ltd (TCD).

TRD Japan's Race Division concentrates on the Super GT Series (JGTC), All-Japan Formula Three Championship Series, Esso Formula Toyota Series, and Netz Cup races (Vitz and 86/BRZ Race Series). Many of these activities has been rebranded under the Toyota Gazoo Racing brand, following the merger of TRD Japan into TCD banner.

TRD USA's Race Division, known as 'Toyota Gazoo Racing North America', competes in NASCAR, NHRA Top Fuel and Funny car, IMSA GT Daytona, Pirelli World Challenge TCA, Formula Drift, TORC, USAC, and Lucas Oil Off Road Racing Series. Former competitions include the Baja 1000, Grand-Am, CART/Champ Car and the Indy Racing League. In association with All American Racers, TRD USA was responsible for developing engines for the Eagle HF89/90 and Eagle MkIII Grand Touring Prototypes.

TRD is not to be confused with Toyota Motorsport GmbH (TMG), which is located in Cologne, Germany, and operates Toyota's FIA World Endurance Championship (WEC) factory team under the name Toyota Gazoo Racing. Within Toyota, TMG is a completely separate entity from, and therefore not under the control of, TRD. Former TMG activities include operating the Toyota Formula One Team (also known as Panasonic Toyota Racing), which competed in the FIA Formula One World Championship (F1). TMG also competed in the FIA World Rally Championship (WRC) as Toyota Team Europe with the famous Celica GT-Four and rally versions of the Corolla, and two attempts (in 1998 and 1999) at the 24 Hours of Le Mans with the GT-One.

Toyota Australia introduced a TRD division in August 2007, with the supercharged Aurion V6, followed by a high-performance variant of the 4WD Hilux in April 2008. Speculation suggested a third model was likely to be a RAV4. TRD was aimed to compete with local in-house tuning shops Holden Special Vehicles (HSV) and Ford Performance Vehicles (FPV). However, in December 2008 Toyota Australia announced it would be ceasing production of its TRD range. The decision took effect on 31 March 2009.

== TRD parts ==
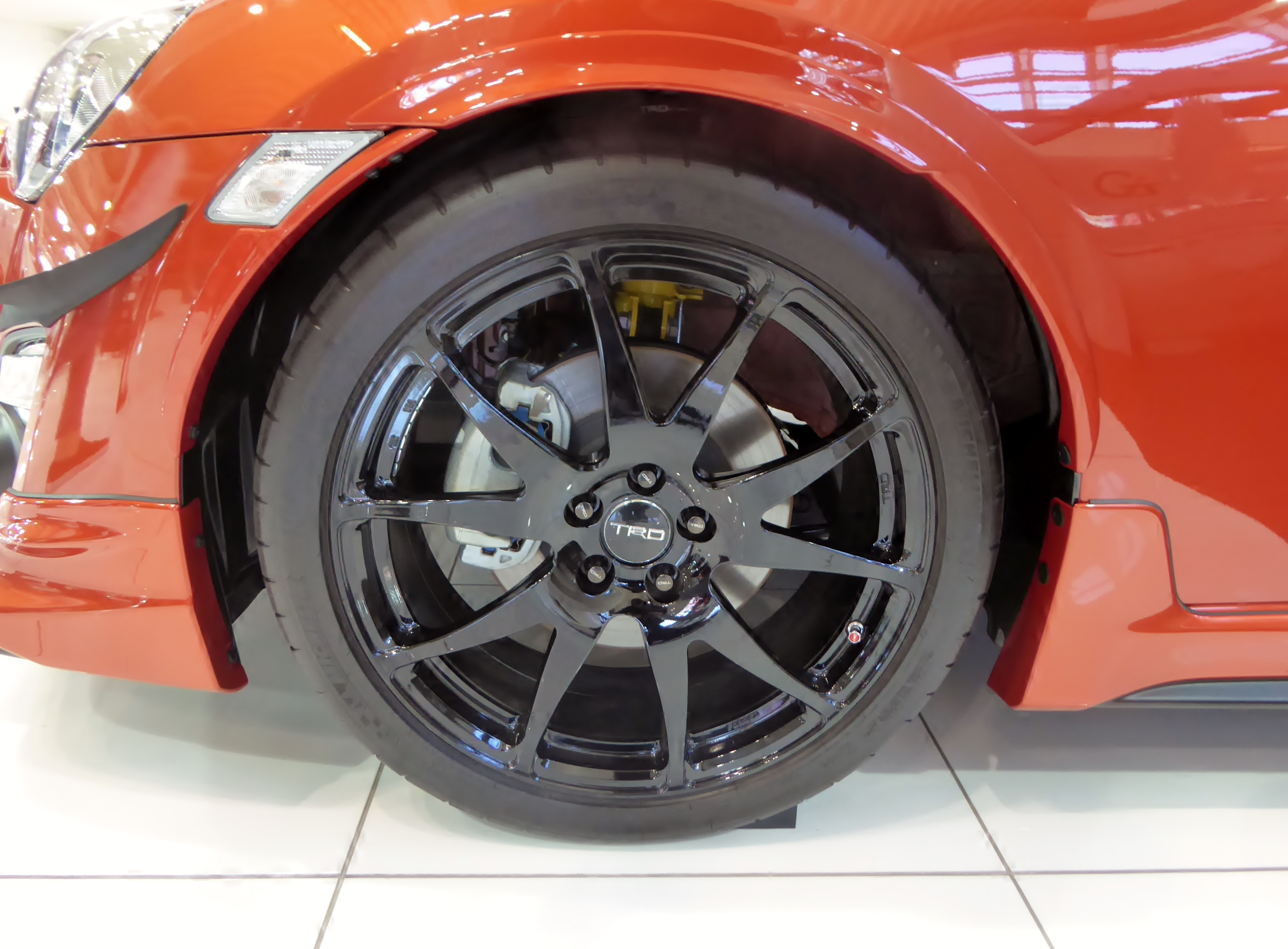
A wheel bearing the TRD logo on a Toyota 86.

TRD offers bolt-on headers, sport mufflers, and cat-back exhausts that are 50 state emission legal. Cold air intakes are also sold but not always emission legal. Suspension equipment includes coilovers, springs, dampers and struts, suspension tower braces, sway bars, and wheel upgrades as well. Braking hardware includes full brake kits including calipers, rotors and stainless steel braided brake lines. Separate performance brake pads are also sold. Oil and air filters are offered. Engine head gaskets and camshafts are sold as well. A number of cosmetic modifications are available among other performance equipment.

== TRD supercharged engine list ==
When install is performed by a Toyota dealer, the 3/36,000 mile warranty extends to the supercharger, otherwise the vehicle retains the factory warranties and the supercharger is covered by a 12 month/unlimited mileage warranty. As of 2015 all TRD Superchargers have been discontinued and ceased production, but all warranties will still be acknowledged.

- 4A-GZE 1.6 L I4 (Roots)
  - AE92 Corolla 1987–1991 (Japan only)
  - AE101 Corolla 1991–1995 (Japan only)
  - AW11 MR2 1986–1989 (Japan, 1988–1989 North America)
  - AE92 Sprinter 1987–1991 (Japan only)
  - AE101 Sprinter 1991–1995 (Japan only)
- 1ZZ-FE 1.8 L I4 (Roots)
  - 2003–04 Matrix
  - 2003–04 Corolla
  - 2003–04 Pontiac Vibe (factory warranty from GM rather than Toyota, but same rules apply)
- 2AZ-FE 2.4 L I4 (centrifugal)
  - 2005–2010 Scion tC
  - 2008–2009 Scion xB
- 1MZ-FE 3.0 L V6 (Roots)
  - 1994–96 Camry Requires minor modification. (discontinued)
  - 1997–00 Camry (discontinued)
  - 1998–00 Sienna (discontinued)
  - 1999–00 Solara (discontinued)
- 5VZ-FE 3.4 L V6 (Roots)
  - 1995–04 Tacoma
  - 1997–98 T100
  - 2000–03 Tundra
  - 1996–02 4Runner
- 2GR-FZE 3.5 L V6 (Roots)
  - 2008– TRD Aurion (factory installed, world's first Eaton TVS supercharged production car)
- 1GR-FE 4.0 L V6 (Roots)
  - 2005–2015 Tacoma
  - 2007–09 FJ Cruiser
  - 2003-09 4Runner
- 1FZ-FE 4.5 L I6
  - 1995–97 Landcruiser
- 2UZ-FE 4.7 L V8
  - 2000–09 Tundra
  - 2001–09 Sequoia
  - 2003 GX 470
  - 2003–09 4Runner
- 3UR-FE 5.7 L V8 (Roots, Eaton TVS, air to liquid intercooler)
  - 2007–2021 Tundra
  - 2008–2022 Sequoia

== Models ==
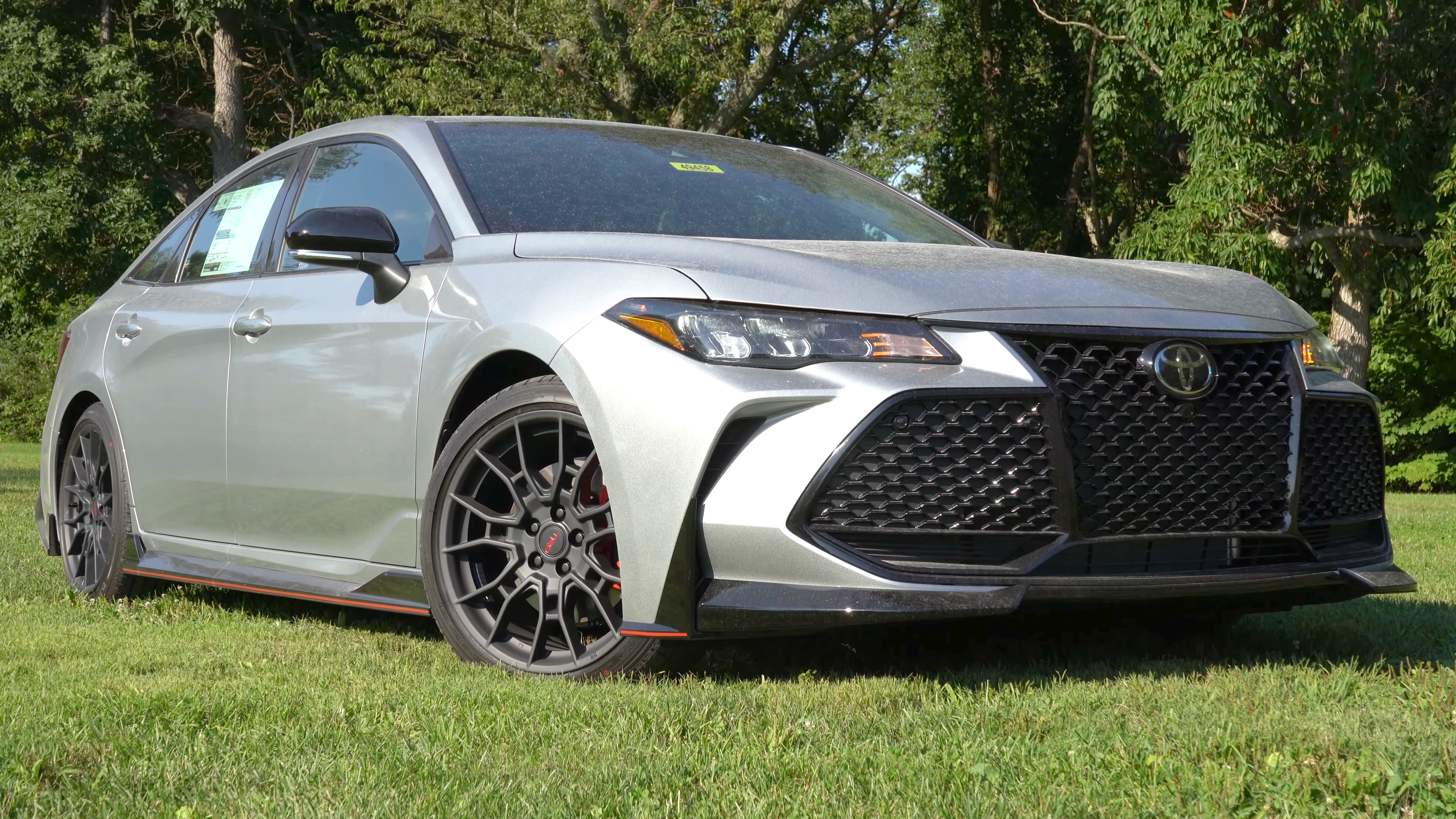
2020 Toyota Avalon TRD

- Toyota 4Runner TRD Pro
- Toyota 4Runner TRD Off-Road
- Toyota 4Runner TRD Off-Road Premium
- Toyota 4Runner TRD Sport
- Toyota Tacoma TRD Sport
- Toyota Tacoma TRD Off-Road
- Toyota Tacoma TRD Pro
- Toyota Hilux TRD
- Toyota Fortuner TRD
- Toyota Tundra SR5, Limited, Platinum, or 1794 Edition with TRD Sport package
- Toyota Tundra SR5, Limited, Platinum, or 1794 Edition with TRD Off-Road package
- Toyota Tundra TRD Pro (USA and Canada only)
- Toyota Sequoia TRD Sport
- Toyota Sequoia TRD Pro
- Toyota RAV4 TRD Off-Road
- Toyota Camry TRD
- Toyota Avalon TRD
- TRD Aurion

== TD2 ==
Through the TRD brand Toyota since the early-2010's has had a driver development program called TD2 which offers training to develop drivers so they can succeed at the top level of motorsports. Drivers currently in the program as of 2022 consist of Chandler Smith, Christian Eckes, Corey Heim, Gracie Trotter, Sammy Smith, Kaylee Bryson, Cannon McIntosh, Presley Truedson, and Daison Pursley. Drivers such as Erik Jones, Christopher Bell, and Harrison Burton have "graduated" from the program and made it to the NASCAR Cup Series which the program preps its drivers for.

Most drivers in the program can be marked by the TD2 logo often seen on the back towards the collar or "neck" of their fire suits and/or the back center of their helmets.

== See also ==
- Lexus F division
- Toyota in motorsports
- Toyota Gazoo Racing
- Toyota Racing
- Toyota G Sports
