= Toyota MZ engine =

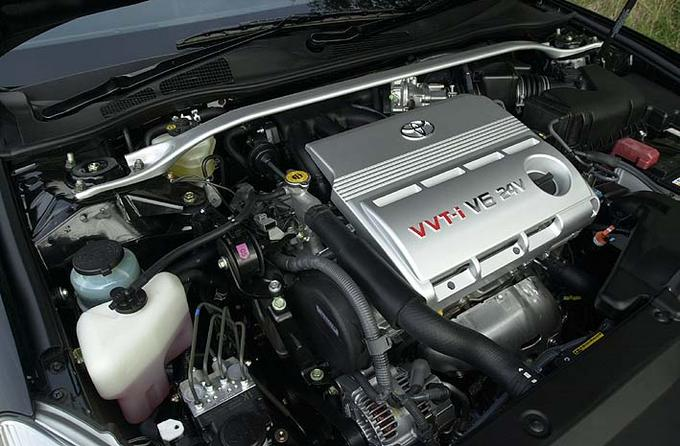
- 1MZ-FE engine in a Toyota Windom

Overview
- Manufacturer: Toyota Motor Corporation
- Production: 1993–2014

Layout
- Configuration: V6
- Displacement: 2.5 L (2,496 cc); 3.0 L (2,994 cc); 3.3 L (3,310 cc)
- Cylinder bore: 87.5 mm (3.44 in); 92 mm (3.62 in)
- Piston stroke: 83 mm (3.27 in); 69.2 mm (2.72 in)
- Cylinder block material: Aluminium alloy
- Cylinder head material: Aluminium alloy
- Valvetrain: DOHC 4 valves x cyl.

Combustion
- Supercharger: TRD (some versions)
- Fuel system: Multi-port fuel injection
- Fuel type: Gasoline
- Cooling system: Water cooled

Output
- Power output: 194–242 hp (145–180 kW; 197–245 PS)
- Torque output: 180–242 lb⋅ft (244–328 N⋅m)

Chronology
- Predecessor: Toyota VZ engine
- Successor: Toyota GR engine

The Toyota MZ engine family is a piston V6 engine series. It was the successor to the previous VZ engine family, and was Toyota's second V6 engine series. It is a lightweight V6 engine of an all-aluminium design, using more lightweight parts than the previous heavy-duty VZ block engines in an effort to lower production costs and decrease engine and reciprocating weight without sacrificing reliability.

Toyota sought to enhance the drivability pattern of the engine (over the 3VZ-FE) at exactly 3000 rpm, since that was the typical engine speed for motors cruising on the highway. The result was less cylinder distortion coupled with the decreased weight of rotating assemblies, smoother operation at that engine speed, and increased engine efficiency.

The MZ series has an aluminium engine block and aluminium alloy DOHC cylinder heads. The cylinders are lined with cast iron, and is of a closed deck design (no open space between the bores). The engine is a 60 degree V6 design. It uses sequential multi-port fuel injection (SFI/MFI), four valves per cylinder, a one-piece cast camshaft and a cast aluminium (Cable-Driven throttle variant) or plastic (ETCS-i/Drive-by-Wire variant) intake manifold.

This engine has been phased out in most markets, replaced by variants of the then-new GR series.

== 1MZ-FE ==
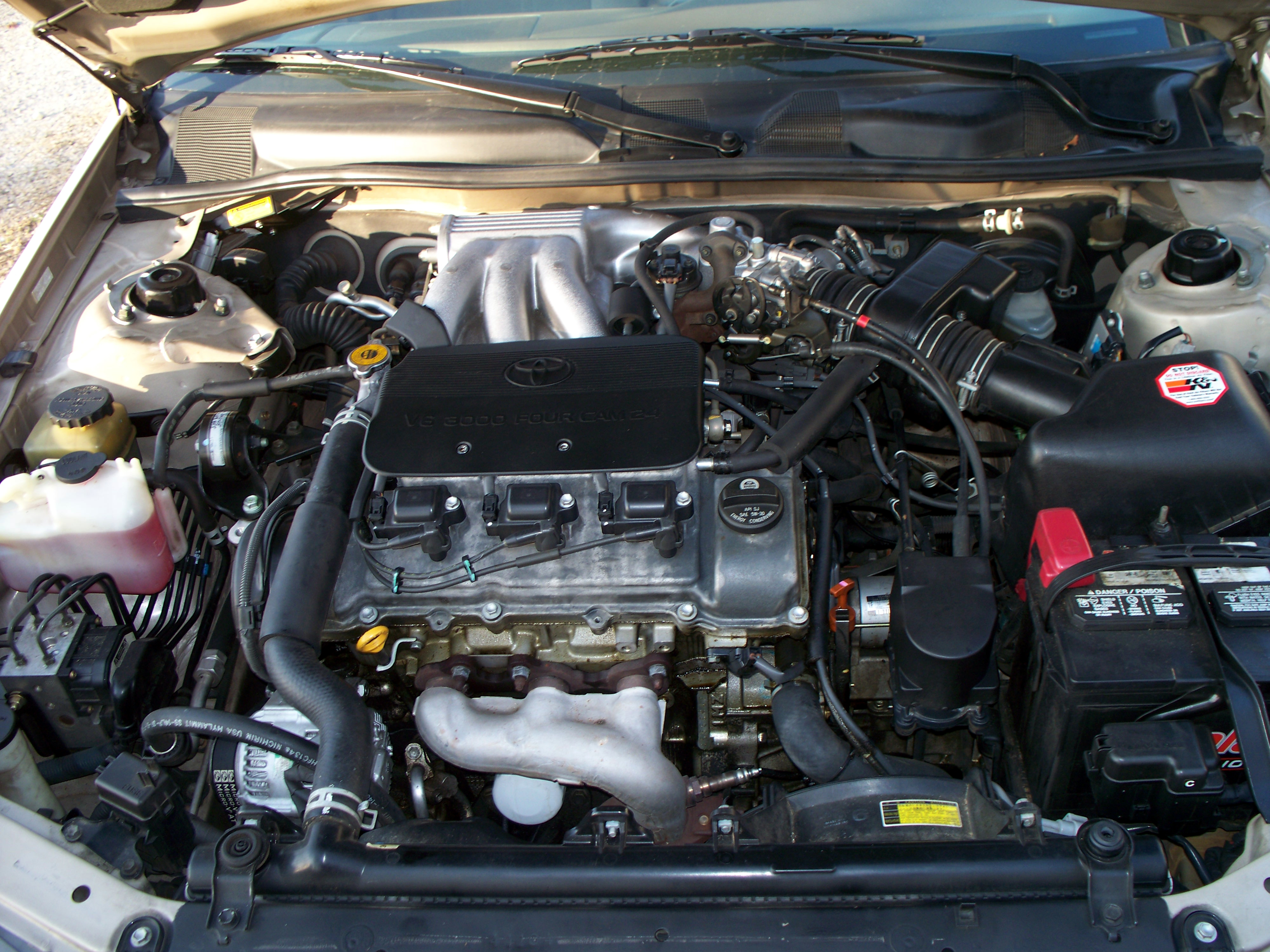
Toyota 1MZ-FE engine without VVT-i

The 1MZ-FE is a 3.0 L (2,994 cc) dual overhead cam (DOHC) V6 engine, replacing the 3VZ-FE as the standard 3.0 L V6 engine in North America and later worldwide. Bore and stroke is 87.5 mm × 83 mm (3.44 in × 3.27 in). Output is 194–201 hp (145–150 kW; 197–204 PS) at 5,200–5,400 rpm with 183–209 lb⋅ft (248–283 N⋅m) of torque at 4,400 rpm. Horsepower ratings dropped after the Society of Automotive Engineers (SAE) implemented a new power measurement system for vehicle engines; Toyota engines rated on 87 octane dropped the most, compared to the same engines used by Lexus rated on 91 octane. It has bucket tappets and was designed for good fuel economy of 19 mpg_{‑US} (12 L/100 km; 23 mpg_{‑imp}) city and 25 mpg_{‑US} (9.4 L/100 km; 30 mpg_{‑imp}) highway without an overall performance trade-off.

Toyota Racing Development offered a factory supported bolt-on supercharger kit for the MY1997–2000 Camry, MY1998–2000 Sienna and MY1999–2000 Solara in North America. Power output was bumped to 242 hp (180 kW; 245 PS) and 242 lb⋅ft (328 N⋅m) of torque.

The 1MZ-FE was on Ward's 10 Best Engines list for 1996.

Applications:

- 1994–2002 Toyota Camry (V6)
- 2002–2006 Toyota Camry (MCV36R) (Australian/New Zealand domestic market)
- 1994–2003 Lexus ES 300 and Toyota Windom (Japanese domestic market)
- 1994–2004 Toyota Avalon and 2000 Toyota Pronard (Avalon for Japanese domestic market)
- 1997-2003 Toyota Harrier (non-US markets)
- 1997–2002 Toyota Sienna
- 1997–2001 Toyota Mark II Wagon (Japanese domestic market)
- 1998–2003 Toyota Camry Solara (V6)
- 2000–2005 Toyota Estima/Toyota Tarago/Toyota Previa

Beginning in 1998, VVT-i was added. This increased the output to 210 hp (157 kW; 213 PS) at 5800 rpm and 222 lb⋅ft (301 N⋅m) of torque at 4400 rpm. It was used on later models of the Avalon, Sienna and Camry. When installed in the Highlander and RX300, power was 220 hp (164 kW; 223 PS); torque and engine speeds did not change. Early versions of the 1MZ-FE with VVT-i used a dual throttle body while later versions used a drive by wire system (or electronic throttle control). It also contains an EGR block off plate on the exhaust manifolds.

Applications:

- 1997–2003 Lexus ES 300
- 1998–2003 Lexus RX 300 (US market)
- 2000–2004 Toyota Avalon
- 2000–2003 Toyota Highlander/Kluger
- 2001–2003 Toyota Sienna
- 2002–2008 Toyota Alphard (Japanese domestic market)
- 2003–2006 Toyota Camry (V6) (ETCS-i variant)

== 2MZ-FE ==
Toyota 2MZ-FE engine

The 2MZ-FE is a 2.5 L (2,496 cc) V6 engine, replacing the 4VZ-FE as the worldwide 2.5 L V6 engine. Bore and stroke is 87.5 mm × 69.2 mm (3.44 in × 2.72 in). Output is 197 hp (147 kW; 200 PS) at 6000 rpm with torque of 180 lb⋅ft (244 N⋅m) at 4600 rpm.

Applications:

- 1996–2001 Toyota Camry (Japanese, NZ and some other Non-US markets)
- 1996–2001 Toyota Windom (Japanese domestic market)
- 1997–2001 Toyota Mark II Qualis (Japanese domestic market)

== 3MZ-FE ==
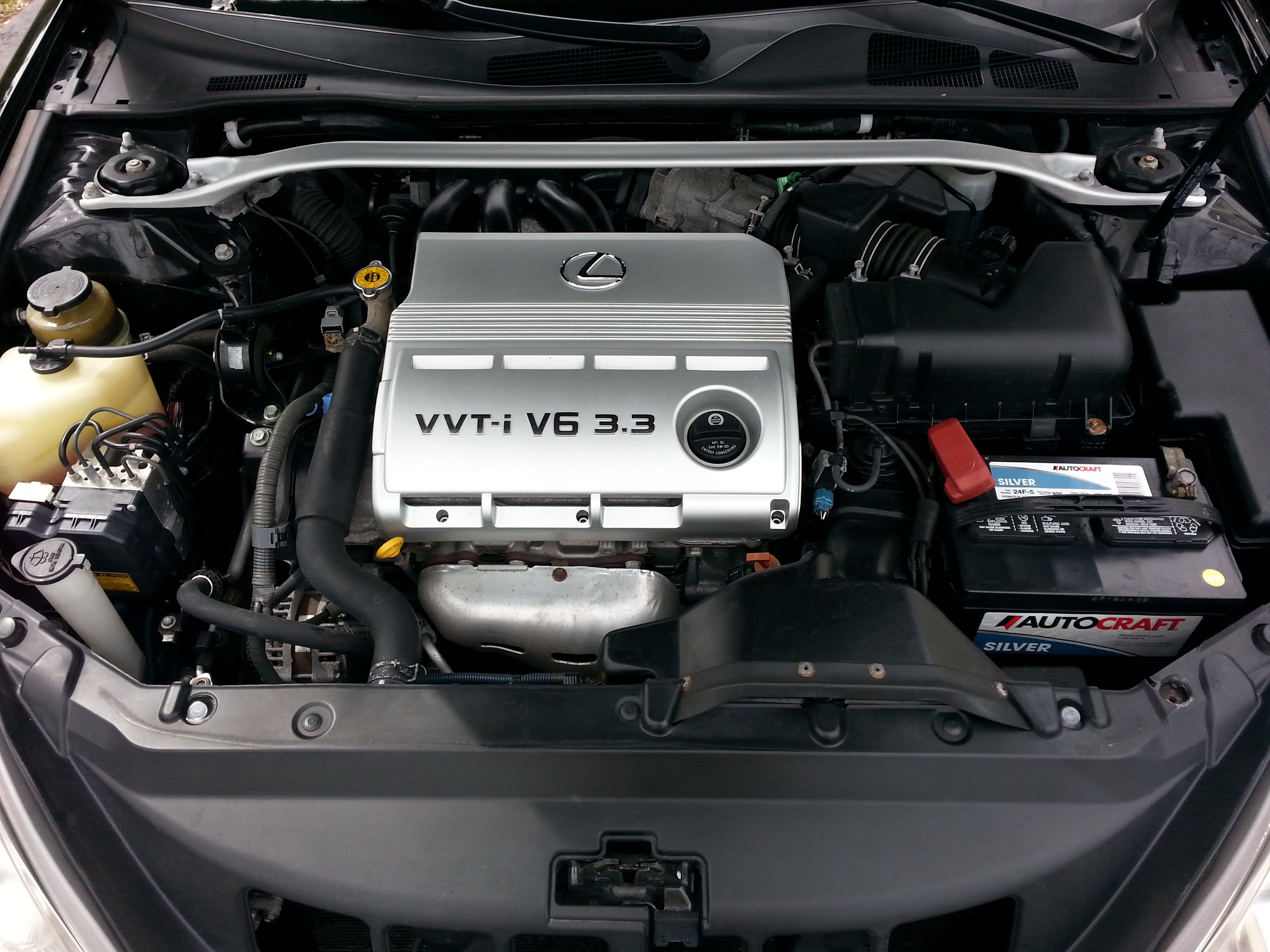
3MZ-FE in a 2004 Lexus ES330

The 3MZ-FE is a 3.3 L (3,310 cc) version. Bore and stroke is 92 mm × 83 mm (3.62 in × 3.27 in). Output is 225 hp (168 kW; 228 PS) with 240 lb⋅ft (325 N⋅m) of torque in the Camry and 230 hp (172 kW; 233 PS) with 242 lb⋅ft (328 N⋅m) of torque in the Sienna and Highlander. For hybrid applications (Highlander Hybrid/RX 400h), power output is reduced and rated at 208 hp (155 kW; 211 PS) hp and 212 lb⋅ft (287 N⋅m) of torque. It also features VVT-i, ETCS-i (Electronic Throttle Control System — intelligent/DBW), PA6 plastic intake, and increased throttle body diameter over the 1MZ. The 3MZ uses a new flat-type knock sensor, which is a departure from the typical resonator type knock sensor used on the previous MZs. Previous MZs had poor knock control, or perhaps oversensitivity when detecting knock, and power loss up to 20 hp (15 kW) may be realized due to erratic ignition timing when using an octane lower than 91. The new flat-type knock sensor is a completely different design and detects more frequencies than the traditional resonator type. This provides the ECU with more accurate data. A bolt goes through the center of the knock sensor, which then mates the sensor to the block on each bank.

Applications:

- 2004-2007 Toyota Highlander
- 2004–2008 Toyota Camry Solara (V6)
- 2004–2006 Toyota Sienna
- 2004–2006 Toyota Camry (XV30) (SE V6)
- 2005–2010 Toyota Highlander Hybrid (reduced power output)
- 2004–2006 Lexus RX 330
- 2006–2008 Lexus RX 400h (reduced power output)
- 2004–2006 Lexus ES 330
- 2006–2014 Mitsuoka Orochi

== Excessive oil consumption issues ==
The MZ engines are notorious for excess oil consumption, otherwise known as "oil gelling" or "engine sludge". This is caused by several factors, including problems with the engine's PCV system, worn-out parts, or a bad or leaking valve cover gasket. This allowed oil to leak into the engine bay, with symptoms ranging from blue-grey smoke, bad spark plugs and sludge buildup in cylinder bank 2, to low compression on the second cylinder. This issue is widespread in many MZ engines produced, especially in later models, and as such affected many vehicles that used this engine in their configurations. It is very important to the life of these engines that oil changes should be done on a regular basis. A class action lawsuit was filed because of this problem. This particular issue remains a significant concern for MZ engines of that era.

== See also ==
- List of Toyota engines
- List of Toyota transmissions
