= Toyota Tacoma =

Mid-size pickup truck

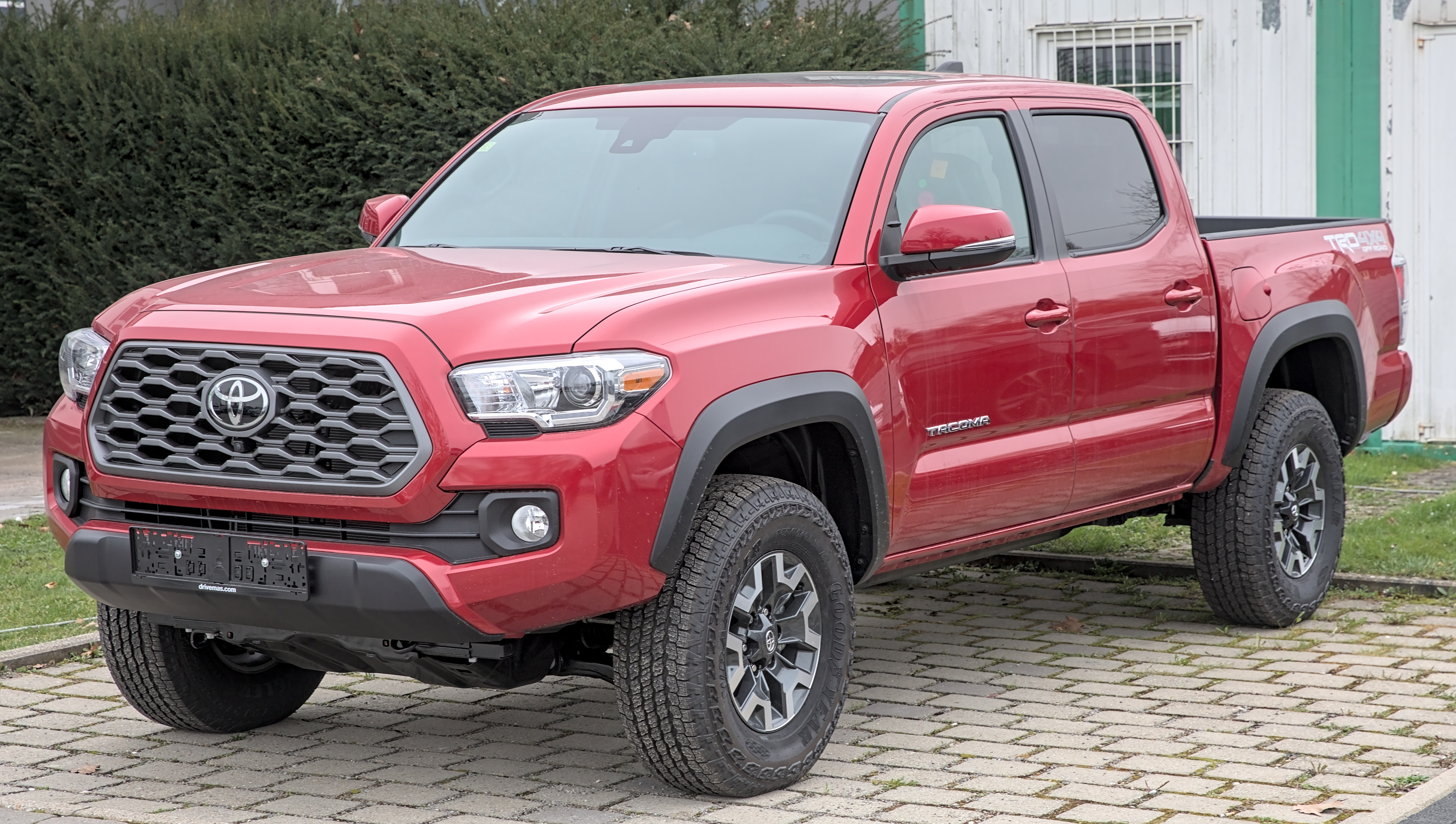
- 2020 Toyota Tacoma TRD Off-Road (N300)

Overview
- Manufacturer: Toyota
- Production: January 1995 – present
- Model years: 1995–present

Body and chassis
- Class: Compact pickup truck (1995–2004); Mid-size pickup truck (2004–present)
- Layout: Front-engine, rear-wheel drive/four-wheel drive

Chronology
- Predecessor: Toyota Truck (1995)

The Toyota Tacoma is a pickup truck manufactured by Japanese automobile manufacturer Toyota since 1995. The first-generation Tacoma (model years 1995 through 2004) was classified as a compact pickup truck; subsequent models are classified as mid-size pickup trucks. The Tacoma was Motor Trend's Truck of the Year for 2005.

As of 2015, the Tacoma was sold in the United States, Canada, Mexico, Costa Rica, Bolivia, Bermuda, and the French overseas collectivity of New Caledonia. Most markets across the world receive the Toyota Hilux in lieu of the Tacoma.

The name "Tacoma" was derived from the Coast Salish peoples' name for Mount Rainier in the U.S. state of Washington.

== First generation (N140/N150/N160/N170/N190; 1995) ==
First generation
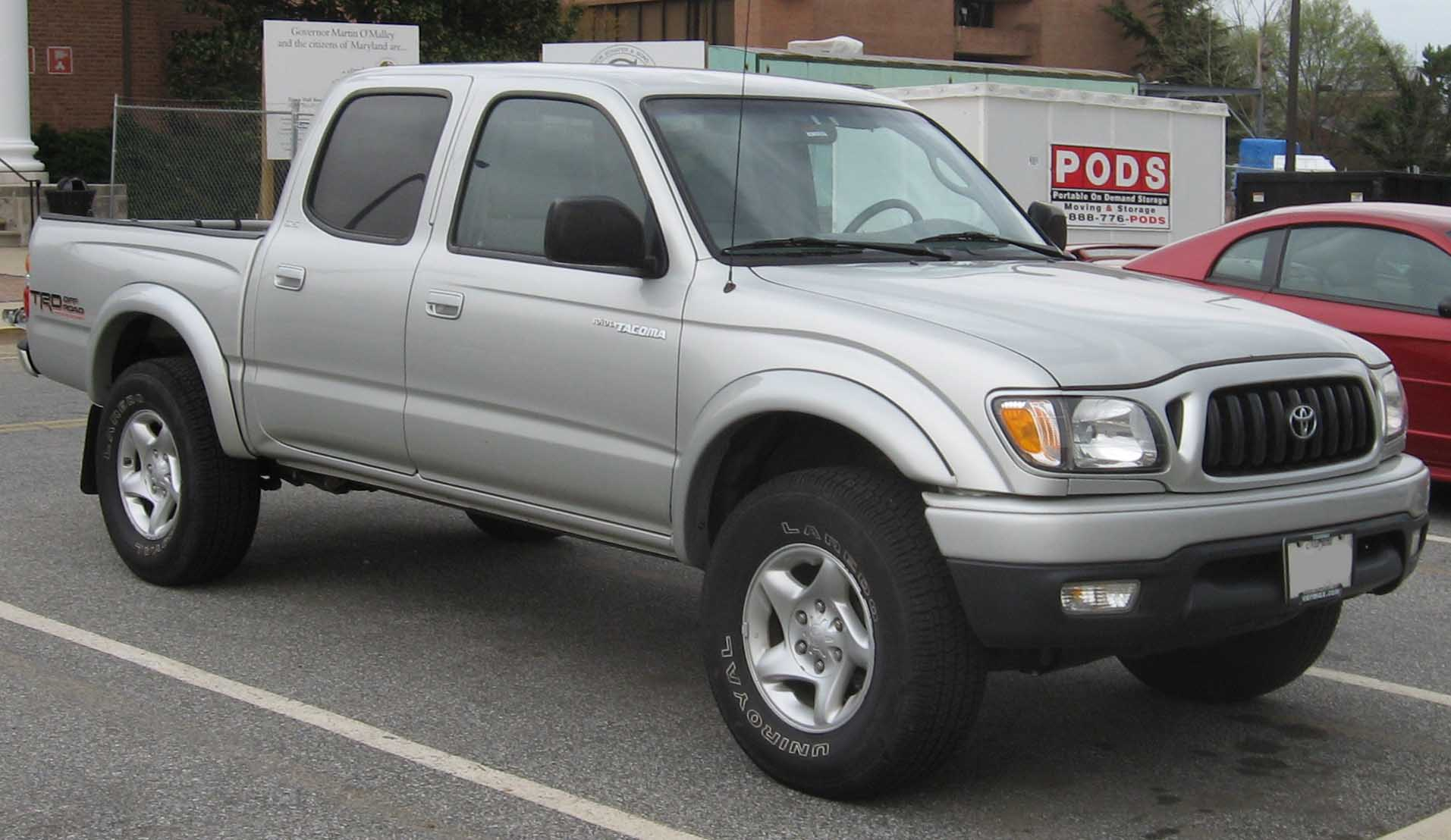

Overview
- Model code: N140; N150; N160; N170; N190
- Production: January 1995 — August 2004
- Model years: 1995–2004
- Assembly: United States: Fremont, California (NUMMI)
- Designer: Kevin Hunter (1991, 1992); Yusuke Fukushima (second facelift: 1998)

Body and chassis
- Body style: 2-door regular cab; 2-door extended cab; 4-door crew cab
- Related: Toyota Hilux (N140/N150/N160/N170); Toyota 4Runner/Hilux Surf (N180); Toyota T100

Powertrain
- Engine: Gasoline: 2.4 L 2RZ-FE I4; 2.7 L 3RZ-FE I4; 3.4 L 5VZ-FE V6
- Transmission: 4-speed A340 automatic; 5-speed manual

Dimensions
- Wheelbase: Regular Cab: 103.3 in (2,624 mm); Xtracab/Double Cab: 121.9 in (3,096 mm)
- Length: 174.8–203.1 in (4,440–5,159 mm)
- Width: 66.5 in (1,689 mm); Between wheel well: 40 in (1,016 mm); 2001–02 Crew Cab: 70.1 in (1,781 mm); 2003–04 Crew Cab: 70.3 in (1,786 mm)
- Height: 2WD: 61.0–64.1 in (1,549–1,628 mm); 4WD: 66.3–67.7 in (1,684–1,720 mm)
- Curb weight: 2WD: 3,155 lb (1,431 kg); 4WD: 3,877 lb (1,759 kg)

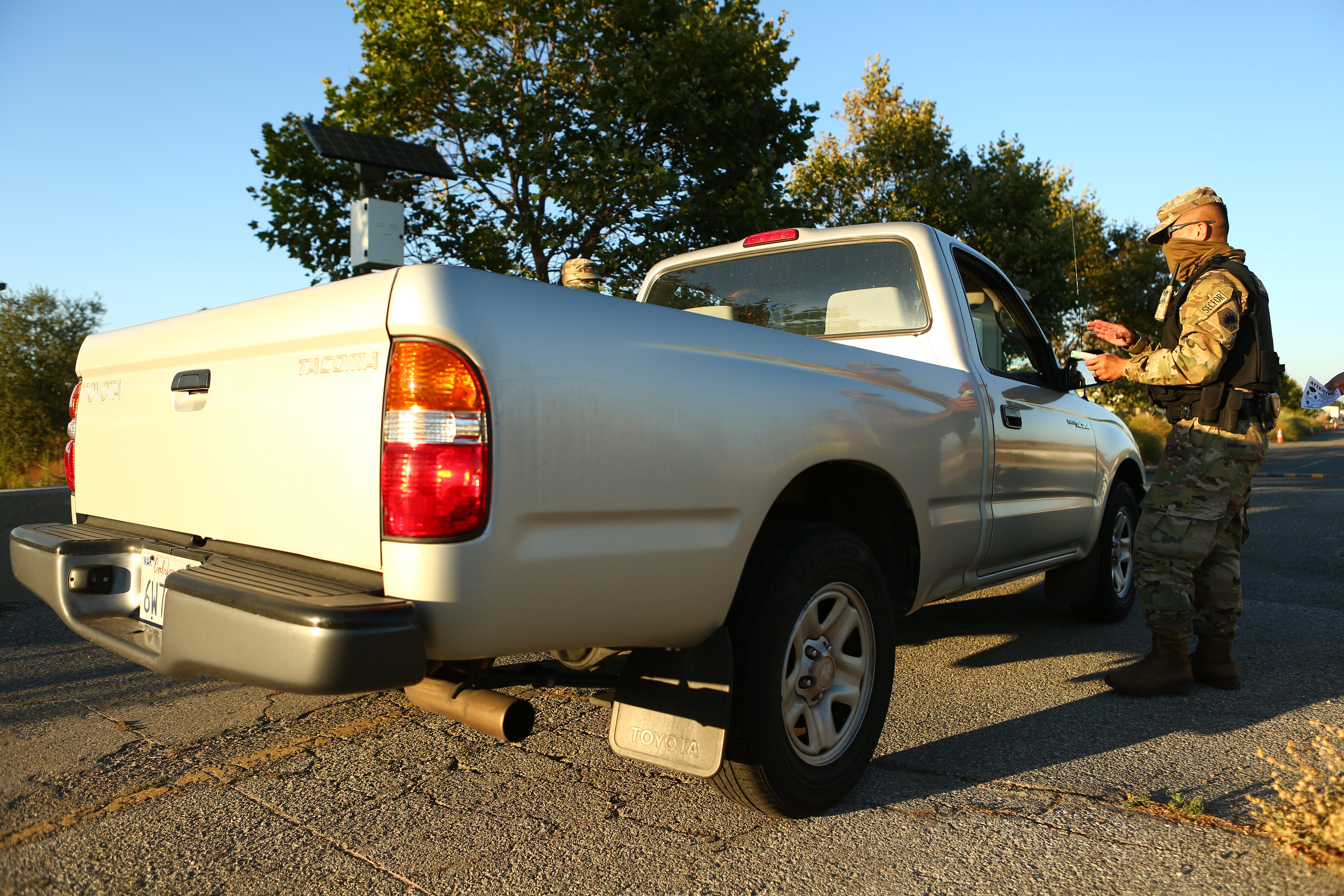
Rear view

The Tacoma was introduced in the US in February 1995 (with a market launch in March 1995) as a replacement for the Toyota Truck (which was the name used for the Hilux in the North American market since 1984). When comparing with the Hilux, the Tacoma receives engineering with greater priority on ride quality, handling, comfort, and safety over ruggedness and payload capacity. The design intends to better suit the needs of the US and Canadian market, where pickup trucks are used as personal vehicles rather than for commercial, agricultural, and off-road purposes.

=== Development ===
Development began in 1989, following the launch of the fifth-generation Toyota Truck in late 1988 and concluded in 1994. Design work was done at Calty Design Research in California from 1990 to 1992, when Kevin Hunter's exterior design proposal was chosen in the autumn of 1991 and in final form, frozen for production in 1992. Patents for the production design were filed in Japan in April 1993 and October 28, 1993, in the United States.

=== Technical ===
Three engines were available for the Tacoma:

Engine	Model	Type	Power	Torque	2WD	4WD	Consumption
2.4 L	2RZ-FE	I4	142 hp 144 PS; 106 kW	160 lb⋅ft 217 N⋅m	Yes	No	26 mpg_{‑US} 9.0 L/100 km (Note: EPA Highway cycle, 2WD)
2.7 L	3RZ-FE	I4	150 hp 152 PS; 112 kW	177 lb⋅ft 240 N⋅m	Yes	Yes	20 mpg_{‑US} 12 L/100 km; 24 mpg_{‑imp} (Note: EPA Highway cycle, 4WD)
3.4 L	5VZ-FE	V6	190 hp 193 PS; 142 kW	220 lb⋅ft 298 N⋅m	Yes	Yes	21 mpg_{‑US} 11 L/100 km; 25 mpg_{‑imp}

Notes

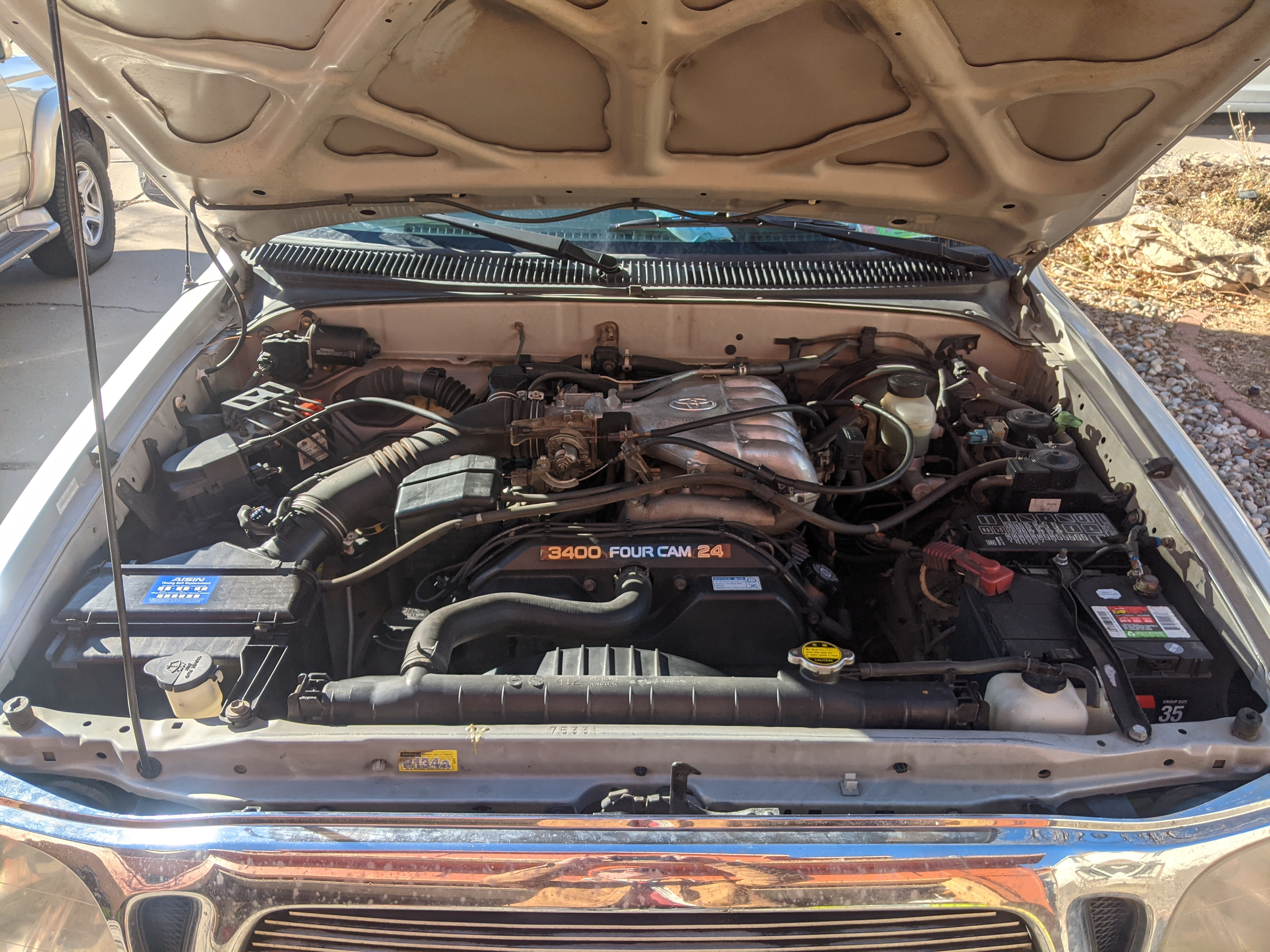
5VZ-FE 3.4 L V6

Two-wheel drive (2WD) Tacomas (excluding PreRunner models) had five-stud wheel-lug patterns and either the 2.4- or 3.4-liter engine. Four-wheel drive (4WD) and PreRunner Tacomas had six-stud wheel-lug patterns and were available with either the 2.7-L or 3.4-L engine. Initially, the 2.4 L was limited to the 2WD models (both regular and Xtracab), while the 2.7-liter the standard engine for 4WD models, and the 3.4-liter V6, shared with the larger T100 truck, was an option for the 2WD (Xtracab only) and 4WD (regular and Xtracab). The top-of-the-line SR5 trim was available for the 4WD Xtracab V6. From 1997 on, the 3.4 L V6 was dropped as an option for the regular cab models, which were available only with a 2.4-L or a 2.7-L four-cylinder engine.

An aftermarket Toyota Racing Development (TRD) supercharger kit was available for the 3.4-liter V6, raising output to 254 hp (258 PS; 189 kW) and 270 lb⋅ft (366 N⋅m). The V6 supercharger kit was specified for model years 1997 and later, as the earlier engine control units (ECUs) had limitations. A kit to add a 7th fuel injector was available, including a replacement ECU, boosting performance further to 262 hp (195 kW) and 279 lb⋅ft (378 N⋅m). In addition, TRD supercharger kits were available for the 4-cylinder engines (2.4 L and 2.7 L) as well.

A five-speed manual transmission was standard for all models initially, with a four-speed automatic transmission available as an option except for the 4WD V6 regular cab. The PreRunner (MY98–04) and Double Cab (01–04) models were available only with an automatic transmission for the first generation. The 3.4 L V6 was paired with the R150F manual transmission or the A340F (4WD) or A340E (2WD) Aisin automatic transmission; the A340F code is 30-40LE.

The first-generation Tacoma has a fully-boxed frame (meaning the main frame rails have a closed rectangular cross-section) until immediately after the rear leaf spring mounting bracket, where the frame transitions into a C-shaped cross-section. The TRD Off-Road package was introduced in 1998. This package added a locking rear differential and was only available to PreRunner and four-wheel drive models that were equipped with the 3.4-L V6. Anti-lock brakes were made standard across the Tacoma line for the 2003 model year.

=== Updates ===
The first-generation Tacoma underwent its first minor update in October 1996, switching from recessed sealed beam headlamps to a flush design on 2WD models. There were two more cosmetic facelifts: the first in July 1997 and the second in October 2000. The most visible changes were in the modified front grilles (both facelifts, for model years 1998 and 2001) and tailgate badging and emblems (first facelift, MY1998). The MY1998 facelift included distinct grilles for the 2WD and 4WD models; 2WD models featured a prominent horizontal bar splitting the grille. A StepSide bed was added as an option for MY2000.

Cosmetic updates, 1995–2004
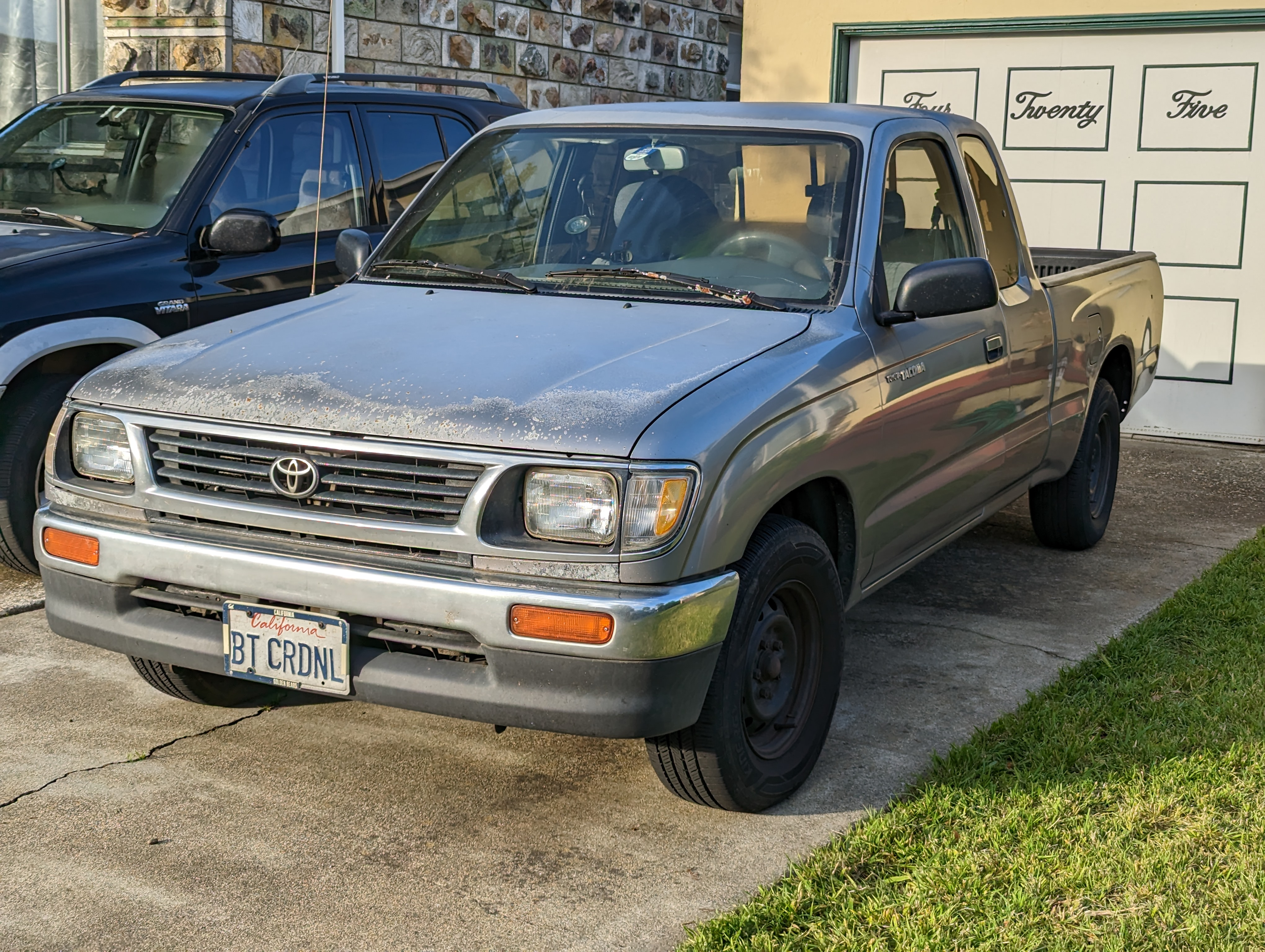
1995–1997 Tacoma Xtracab 2WD
(sealed beam headlamps)

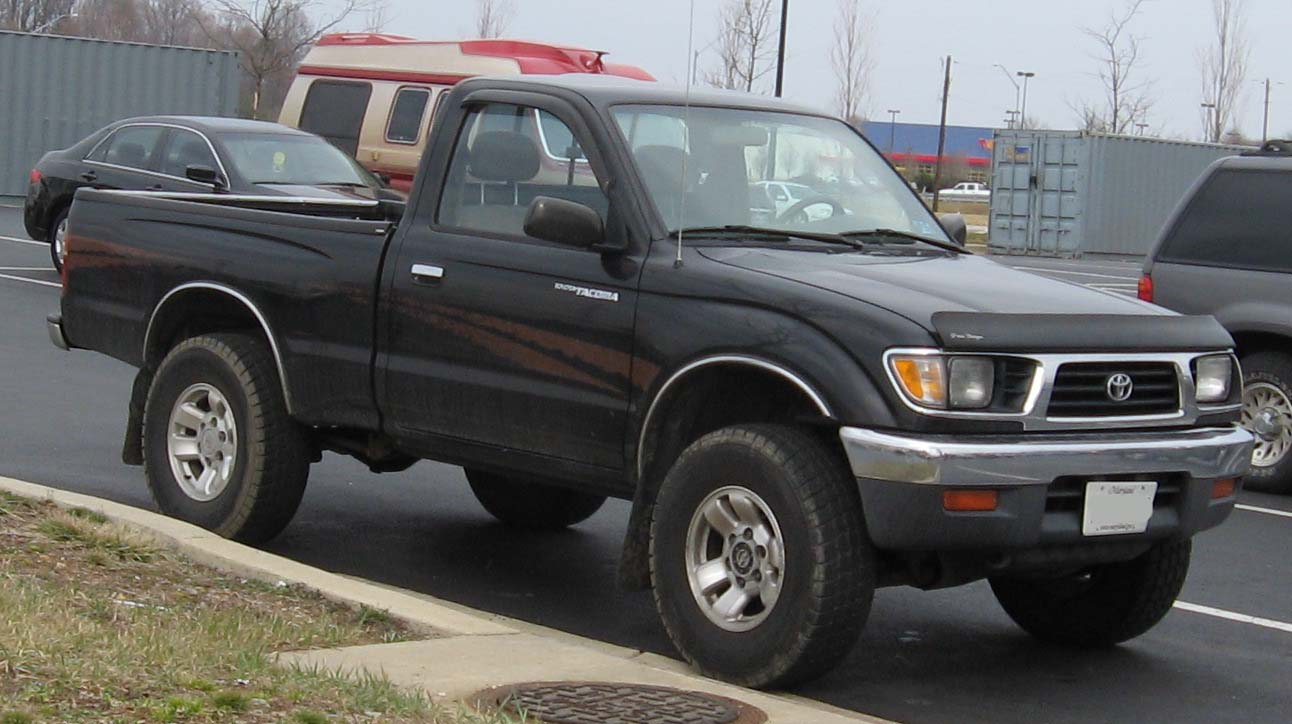
1995–1997 Tacoma 4WD
(sealed beam headlamps)

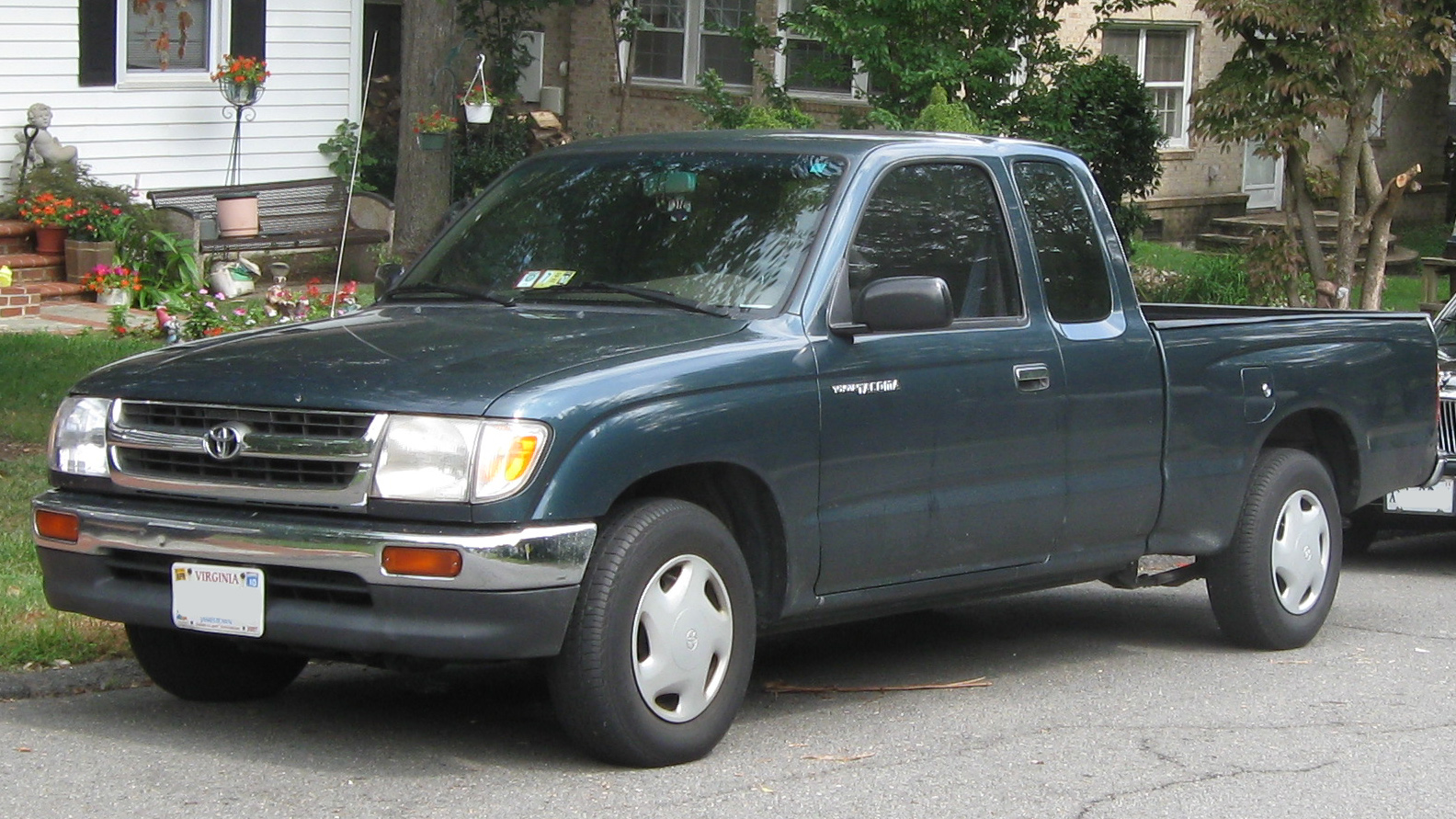
1998–2000 Tacoma Xtracab 2WD
(flush headlamps, first updated grille)

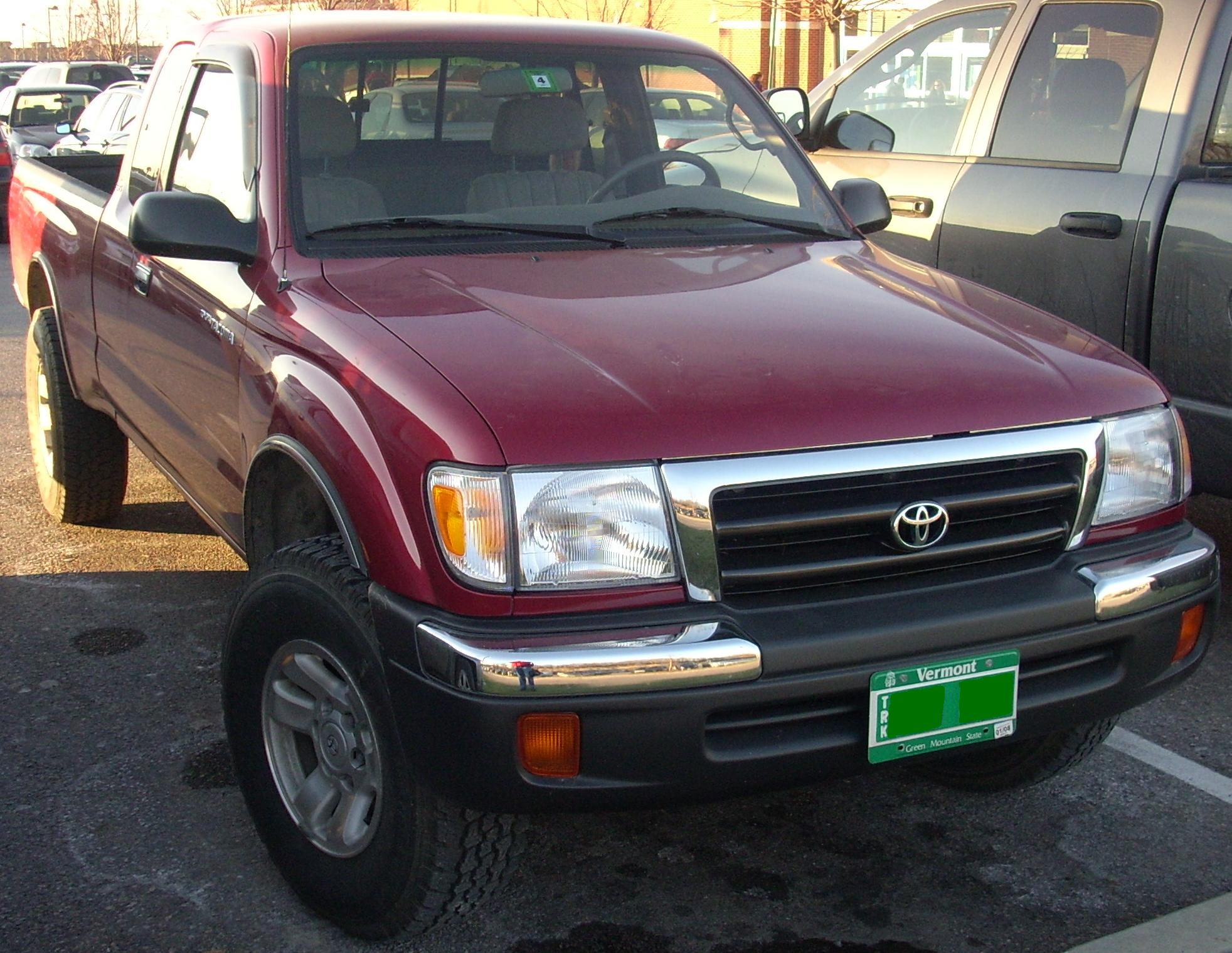
1998–2000 Tacoma Xtracab 4WD
(flush headlamps, first updated grille)

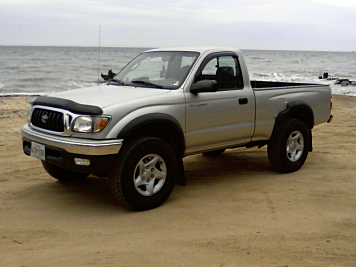
2001–2004 Tacoma Regular Cab
(second updated grille, textured tail light lenses)

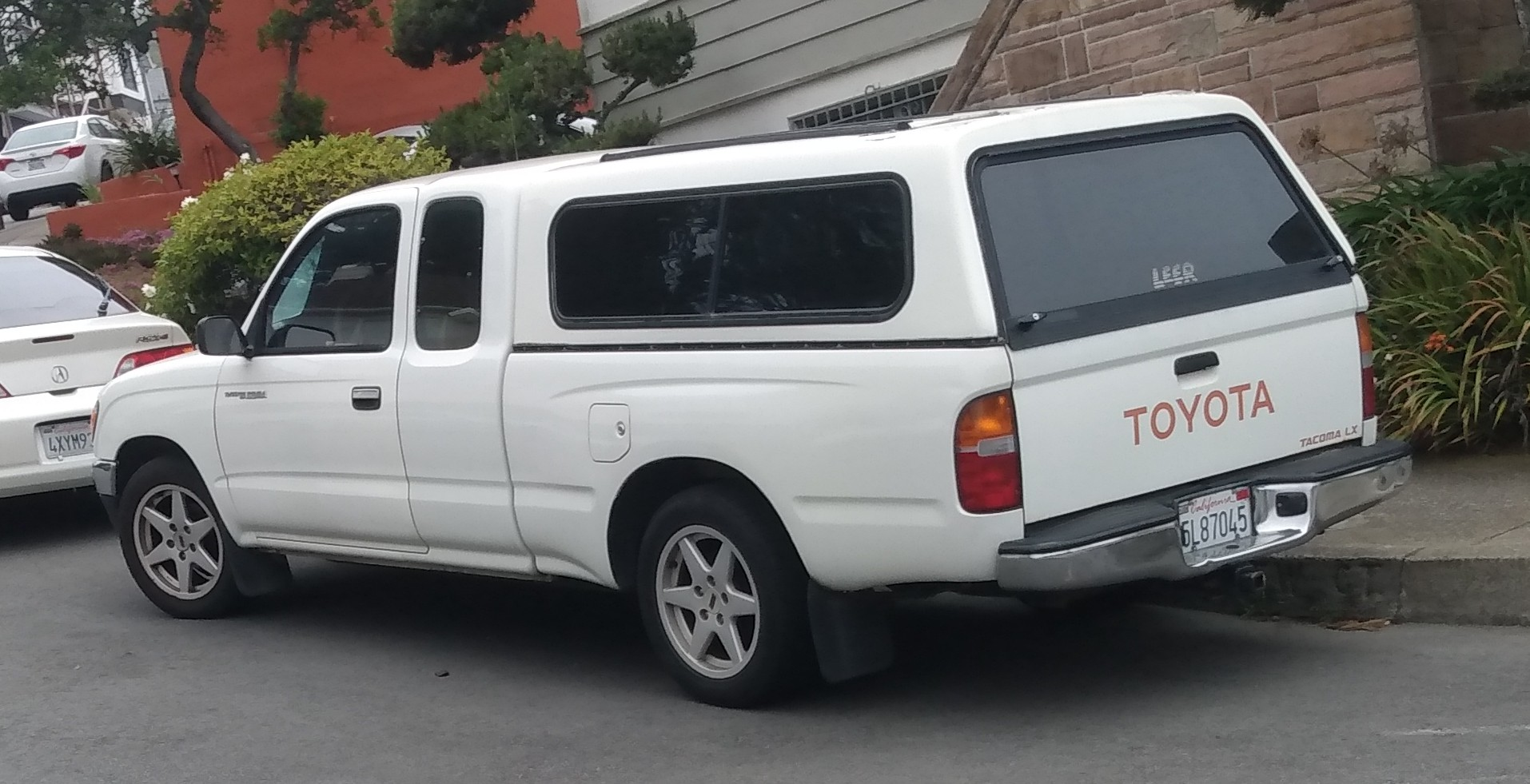
1995–1997 Tacoma rear
(large, centered "TOYOTA" on tailgate)

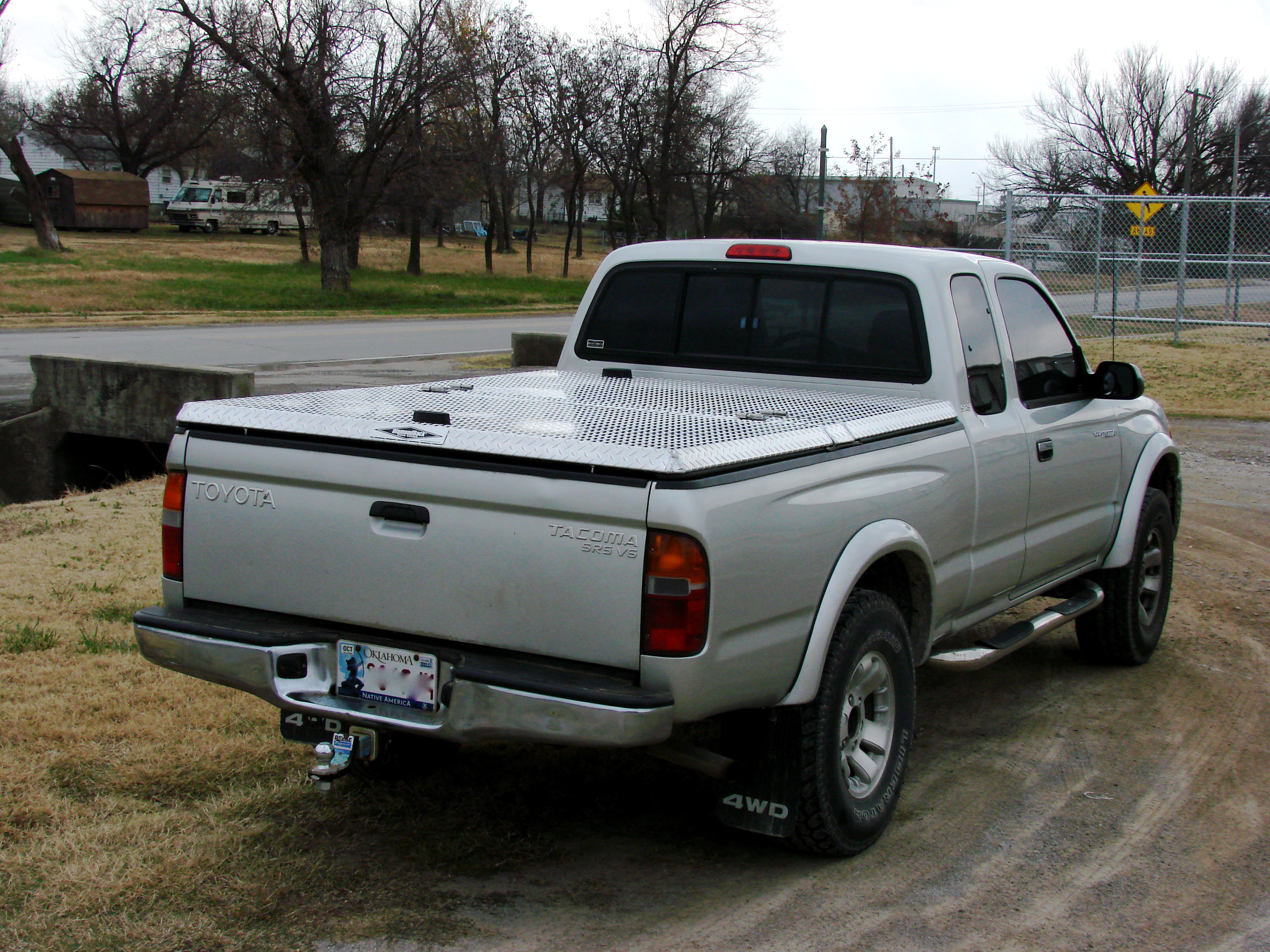
1998–2000 Tacoma rear
(small "TOYOTA" in upper left corner with smooth tail light lenses)

=== Variants ===
At its introduction as a model year 1995 1/2, Tacoma 4WD and 2WD models could be distinguished externally by the front grilles. The 4WD model had two heavy chrome bars flanking a trapezoidal opening, tapering toward the top, while the 2WD model had thinner bars (optionally chrome) with a trapezoidal shape tapering toward the bottom. Both the regular cab and extended Xtracab share the same bed, which has an interior length of 74.5 in (1,890 mm); the wheelbase and overall length of the Xtracab is extended by approximately 18.5 in (470 mm) compared to the regular cab.

The PreRunner model was introduced for the 1998 model year. The PreRunner is a 2WD that shares the same taller suspension, six-lug wheel bolt pattern, and 2.7 L base engine as the four-wheel drive. Along with the four-wheel drive model, it was also available with the TRD Off-Road Package that included a locking rear differential, also introduced in 1998. A Regular Cab PreRunner was introduced in 1999.

Designed through 1998 (by Yusuke Fukushima) as part of the MY2001 facelift (patented on September 22, 1998, at Japan Patent Office under #0890798) was a new crew cab (four-door) model added to the lineup in October 2000. The crew cab, officially dubbed as the Double Cab model, featured four doors and Tokico gas shocks, while the extended cabs still opened with two doors and used Bilstein shocks. The extended cab featured a 6 ft (1.8 m) bed, while the crew cab featured a 5-foot-5-inch (1.65 m) bed. Many customers were upset with small crew cab beds, but most competitors shared this shortcoming.

In October 2000, along with the front facelift, Toyota also unveiled the S-Runner trim package for the 2WD Xtracab that was available exclusively with the 3.4-liter V6 engine coupled to a five-speed manual transmission. The final drive ratio is 3.15:1. Visually, the S-Runner carried a monochrome finish, with a grille and other trim pieces colored to match the exterior in either Black Sand Pearl or Radiant Red. The overall height is reduced by approximately 1 in (25 mm) through the use of low-profile P235/55R16 tires on 16-inch (410 mm) alloy wheels; additional suspension tuning features include Tokico gas shocks and front and rear anti-sway bars. Only 800 were produced each month from September 2000 to August 2004.

Cab and trim variants
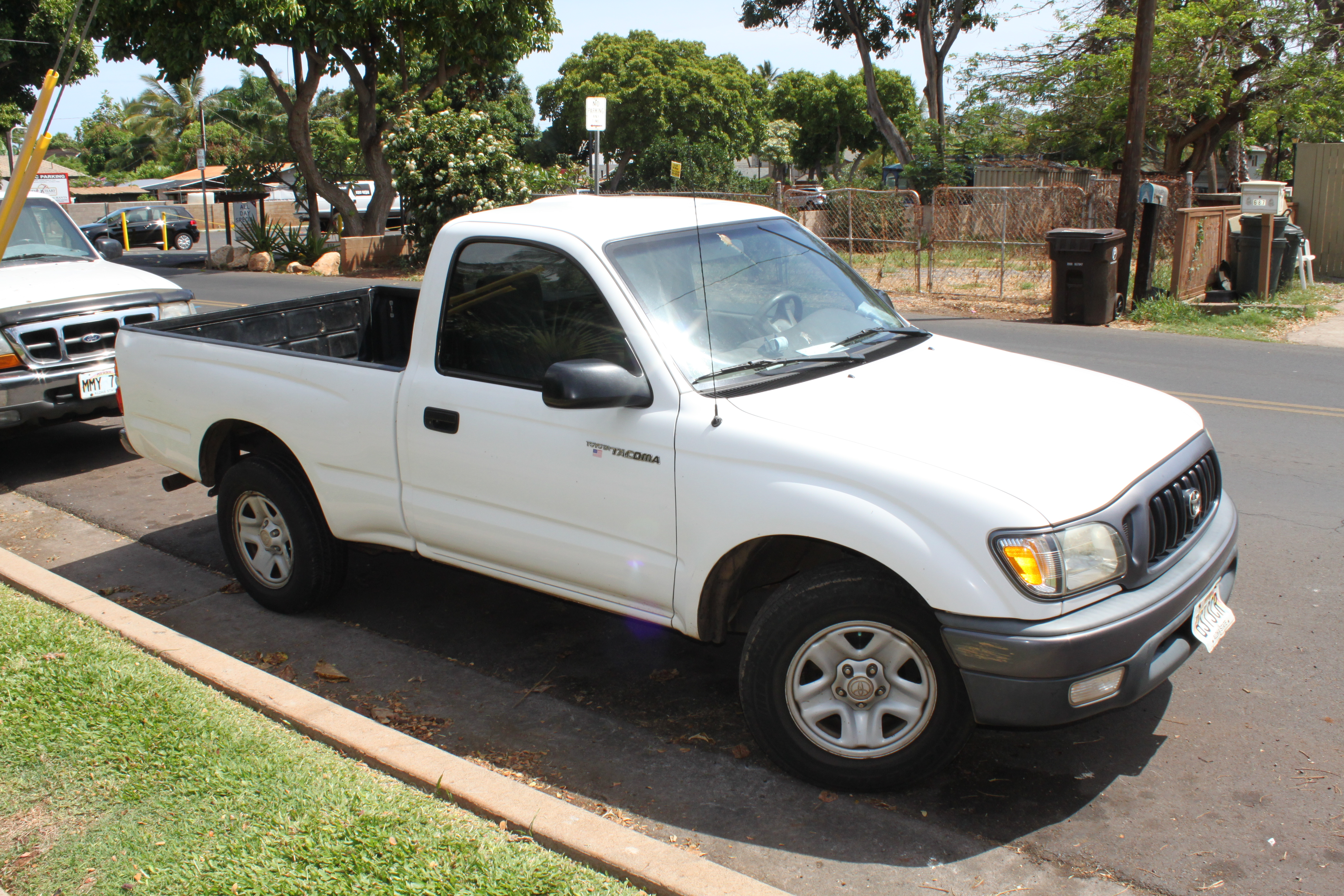
Regular Cab, 2WD

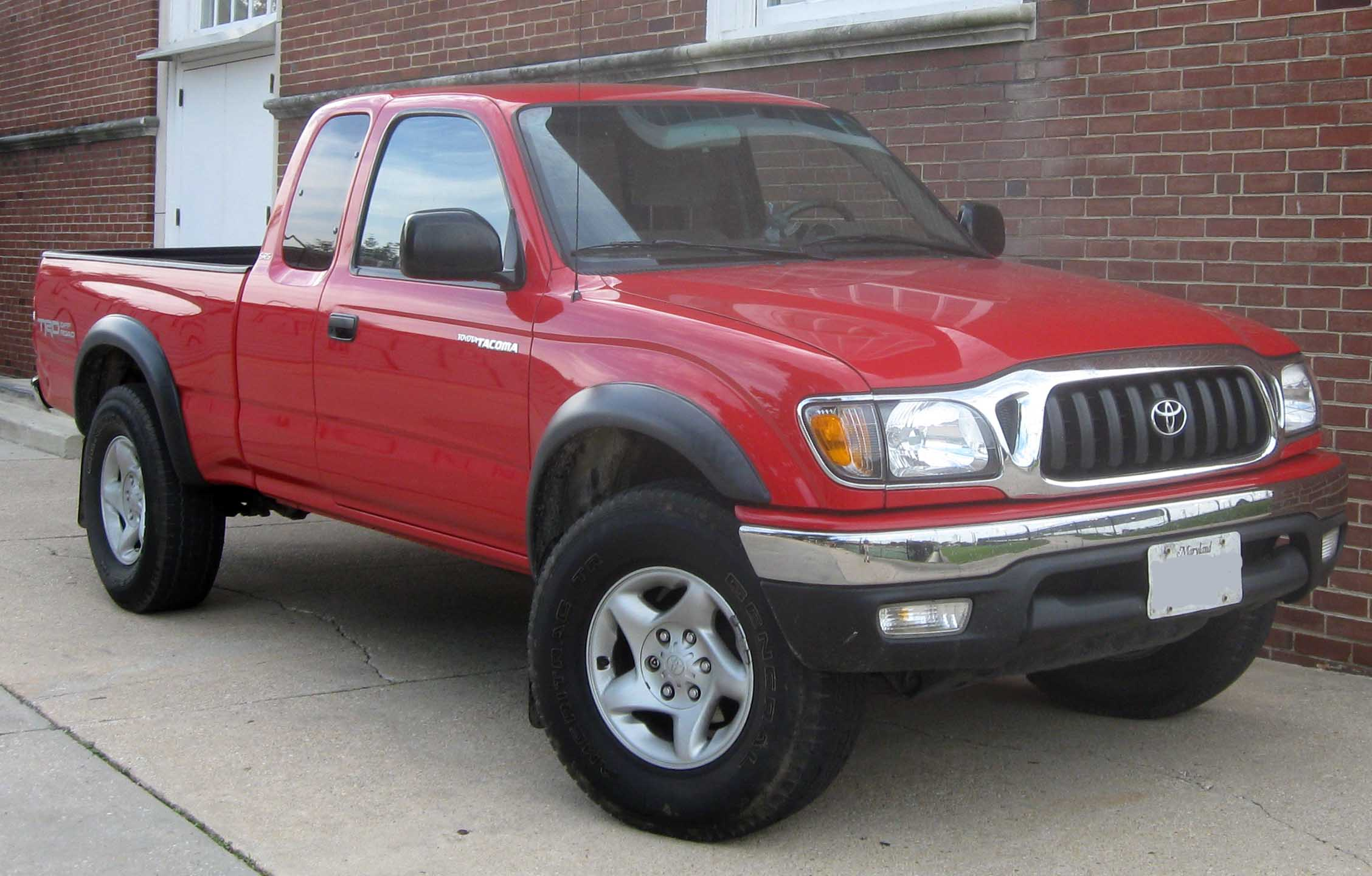
Xtracab SR5 with TRD off-road package

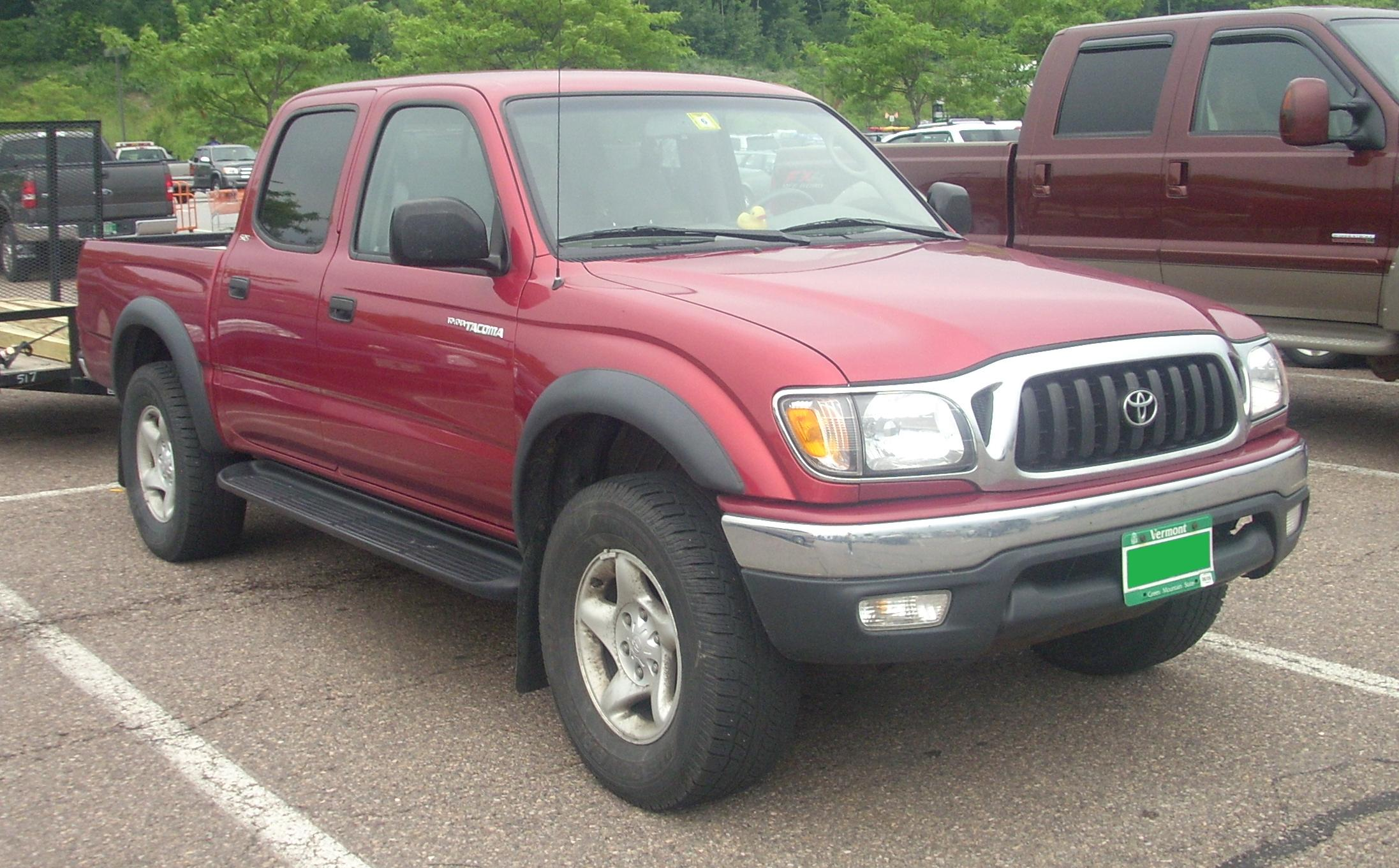
Double Cab SR5

Toyota Tacoma (1st generation) exterior color availability
Production Colors	Model years									
Production Colors	1990s					2000s				
Production Colors	95	96	97	98	99	00	01	02	03	04
Black Metallic (204)	No	Yes	Yes	Yes	Yes	No	No	No	No	No
Black Sand Pearl (209)	No	No	No	No	No	Yes	Yes	Yes	Yes	Yes
Cardinal Red (3H7)	Yes	Yes	Yes	No	Yes	Yes	No	No	No	No
Cobalt Blue Pearl (8K6)	Yes	Yes	Yes	No	No	No	No	No	No	No
Cool Steel Metallic (926)	No	No	No	Yes	No	No	No	No	No	No
Copper Canyon Mica (3M1)	No	No	No	Yes	No	No	No	No	No	No
Evergreen Pearl (751)	Yes	Yes	Yes	Yes	No	No	No	No	No	No
Horizon Blue Metallic (8N1)	No	No	No	No	Yes	Yes	No	No	No	No
Imperial Jade Mica (6Q7)	No	No	No	No	Yes	Yes	Yes	Yes	Yes	Yes
Impulse Red Pearl (3P1)	No	No	No	No	No	No	Yes	Yes	Yes	Yes
Lavender Steel Metallic (926)	No	No	Yes	No	No	No	No	No	No	No
Lunar Mist Metallic (1C8)	No	No	No	No	No	Yes	Yes	Yes	Yes	Yes
Mystic Bronze (M10)	No	No	No	No	No	No	Yes	Yes	Yes	Yes
Mystic Gold Metallic (4P7)	No	No	No	No	No	No	Yes	Yes	Yes	Yes
Mystic Purple Mica (938)	No	No	No	Yes	Yes	No	No	No	No	No
Natural White (056)	No	No	No	No	Yes	Yes	No	No	No	No
Paradise Blue Metallic (754)	Yes	Yes	Yes	No	No	No	No	No	No	No
Pewter Pearl (196)	Yes	Yes	No	No	No	No	No	No	No	No
Radiant Red (3L5)	No	No	No	No	No	No	Yes	Yes	Yes	Yes
Satin Black Metallic (205)	Yes	No	No	No	No	No	No	No	No	No
Sierra Beige Metallic (4M4)	Yes	Yes	Yes	Yes	Yes	No	No	No	No	No
Sunfire Red Pearl (3K4)	Yes	Yes	Yes	Yes	Yes	No	No	No	No	No
Super White (040)	No	No	No	No	No	No	Yes	Yes	Yes	Yes
Surfside Green Mica (6P4)	No	No	No	Yes	Yes	No	No	No	No	No
White/Super White (045)	Yes	Yes	Yes	Yes	No	No	No	No	No	No

=== Recalls ===
In 2008, Toyota proactively announced a 15-year, unlimited-mileage corrosion warranty for 1995–2000 model years due to inadequate rustproofing and frame corrosion issues affecting over 800,000 Tacomas. Toyota will either repair the frame or buy back the truck for 1.5 times its KBB retail value. This was later extended to include 2001–2004 model years, but in these cases when a frame was found to be rusty to the point of perforation, the frame is replaced with a new one instead of a buy back. It is suspected that inadequate drainage in the fully boxed frame may have trapped moisture, leading to corrosion. The second-generation Tacoma moved to a frame with open C-section rails instead.

On November 21, 2012, Toyota recalled about 150,000 Tacoma midsize pickup trucks from the model years 2001 to 2004 that were sold primarily in 20 cold-weather U.S. states. The recall involves the spare tire and how it could fall off.

== Second generation (N220/N240/N250/N260/N270; 2004) ==
Second generation
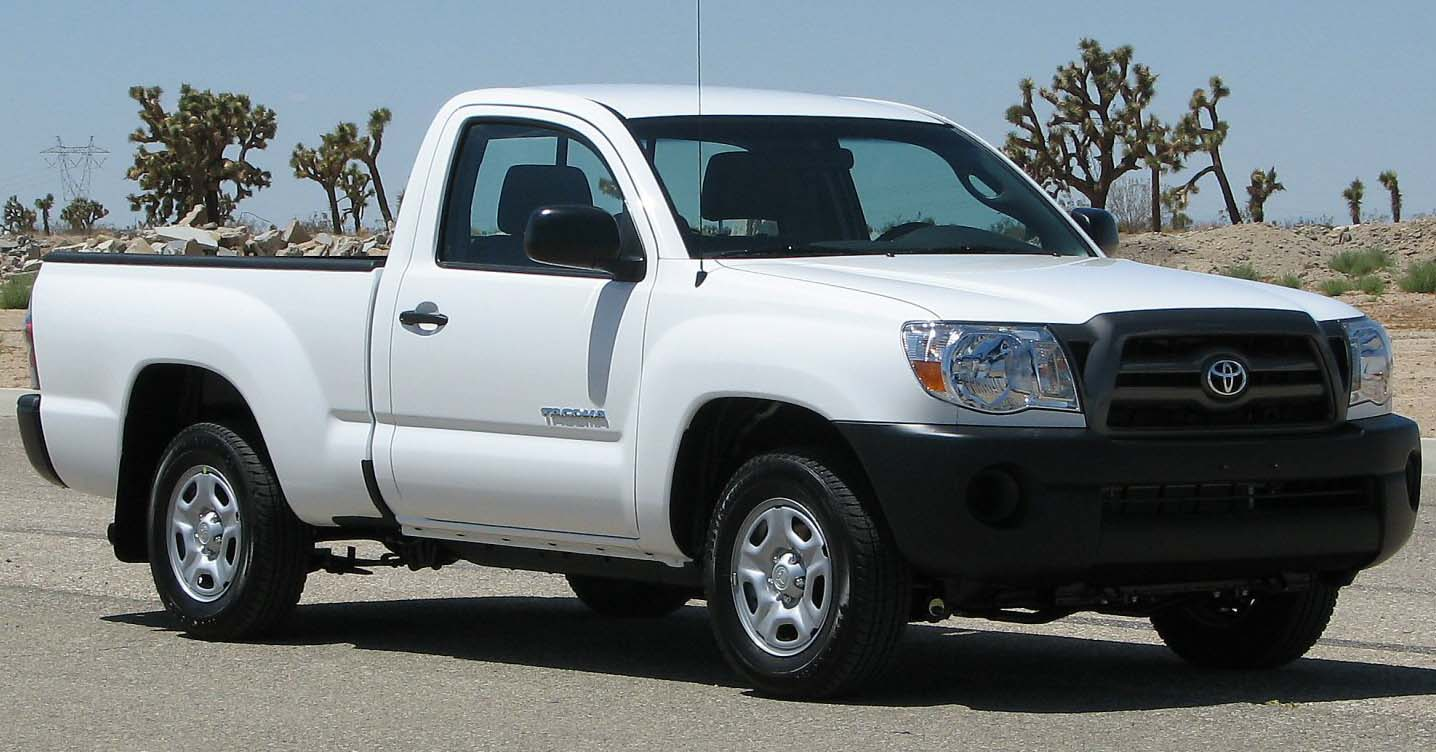

Overview
- Model code: N220; N240; N250; N260; N270
- Production: August 2004 – August 2015
- Model years: 2005–2015
- Assembly: United States: Fremont, California (NUMMI, 2005–2010); San Antonio, Texas (TMMTX, 2010–2015); Mexico: Tijuana (TMMBC)
- Designer: Shigeya Hattori, Hideo Karikomi (2001, 2002); Akira Yamaguchi, Jinichi Sato (facelift: 2010)

Body and chassis
- Body style: 2-door regular cab; 4-door extended cab; 4-door crew cab
- Platform: Toyota F2
- Related: Toyota 4Runner/Hilux Surf (N210); Toyota FJ Cruiser

Powertrain
- Engine: Gasoline: 2.7 L 2TR-FE I4; 4.0 L 1GR-FE V6
- Power output: 159 hp (161 PS; 119 kW) (2TR-FE); 236 hp (239 PS; 176 kW) (1GR-FE)
- Transmission: 4-speed A340 automatic; 5-speed automatic; 5-speed manual; 6-speed manual

Dimensions
- Wheelbase: Regular Cab 2WD: 109.4 in (2,779 mm); Regular Cab 4WD & PreRunner: 110.0 in (2,794 mm); Access Cab: 127.8 in (3,246 mm)/127.2 in (3,231 mm); Double Cab Long Bed: 140.9 in (3,579 mm)
- Length: Regular Cab: 190.4 in (4,836 mm); Access Cab: 208.1 in (5,286 mm); Double Cab Short Bed: 208.1 in (5,286 mm); Double Cab Long Bed: 221.3 in (5,621 mm)
- Width: 2WD Extended: 74.6 in (1,895 mm); 2WD Regular: 72.2 in (1,834 mm); 4WD: 74.7 in (1,897 mm); X-Runner: 74.0 in (1,880 mm)
- Height: Extended Cab & 4WD Regular: 69.9 in (1,775 mm); Double Cab: 70.1 in (1,781 mm); Regular Cab 2WD: 65.7 in (1,669 mm); 2005–06 X-Runner: 65.2 in (1,656 mm); 2007–15 X-Runner: 72.2 in (1,834 mm)
- Curb weight: 3,550–4,220 lb (1,610–1,914 kg)

In 2000, Toyota began development of the second generation Tacoma under chief engineer Chikuo Kubota. The majority of development work was handled by Hino in Japan. Designers Shigeya Hattori and Hideo Karikomi of Hino won the internal design competition in 2001. Final designs were frozen for production in 2002 and patents filed on July 3, 2003, with test mules being tested from early 2003. Prototypes were built later in 2003, with development ending in the second quarter of 2004.

On February 4, 2004, at the Chicago Auto Show, Toyota unveiled a bigger and more powerful Tacoma. Launched on October 18, 2004, as a 2005 model, this new Tacoma was available in eighteen different combinations of three cab configurations, four transmissions, two engines, and two bed lengths.

=== Updates ===
The 2006 model Tacoma had only minor changes from the 2005 model, with some options now standard. Toyota added two new interior colors for the 2007 model year; 2008 models carried over.

A minor facelift came for 2009, including a slightly revised grille on some models, new LED taillamps, and on the X-Runner, TRD off-road and TRD Sport models includes a smoked headlamp trim. Auxiliary audio input now comes standard. The Access/Double Cab trucks have two new ceiling mounted speakers and an available backup monitor. Four new exterior colors are also added to the Tacoma. Safety features were added, and the mechanical limited-slip differential was no longer available. TRD off-road models continue to come equipped with a locking rear differential.

The 2012 model year refresh featured a restyled front bumper, headlights, grille, hood, new interior and a shark fin antenna for the SiriusXM satellite radio. The 2013 model year comes with a touch screen audio system and removes the shark fin antenna and SiriusXM radio capability unless the optional Entune package is installed. 2014 models came with a new SR trim and for 2015 models the regular cab model was discontinued.

In November 2016, Toyota USA settled a class action suit over frame rust, agreeing to inspect and if necessary replace rusted frames on 2005–2010 model year Tacomas, 2007–2008 MY Tundras, and 2005–2008 MY Sequoias in the US and its territories.

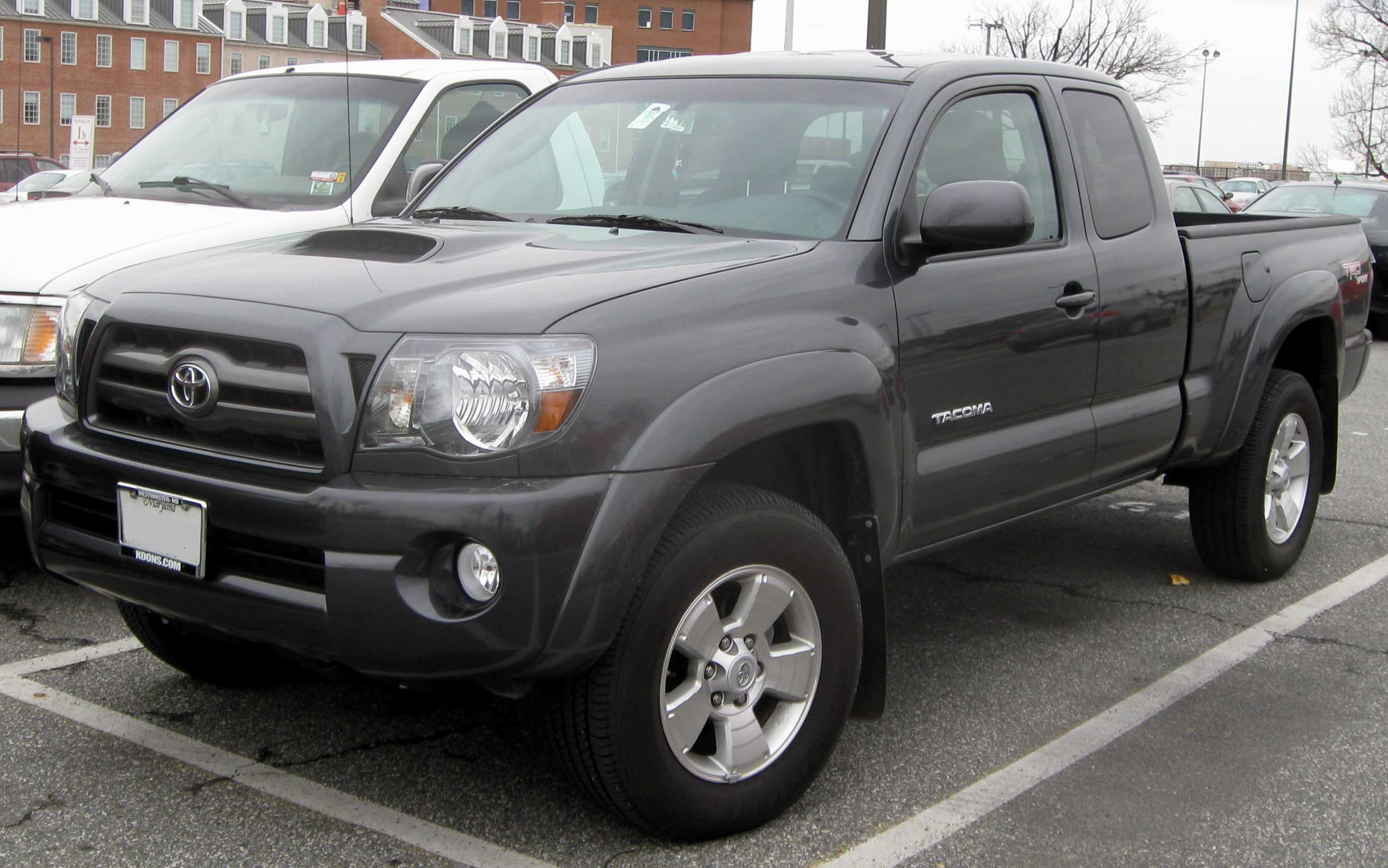
2009 model year Tacoma extended cab (US)

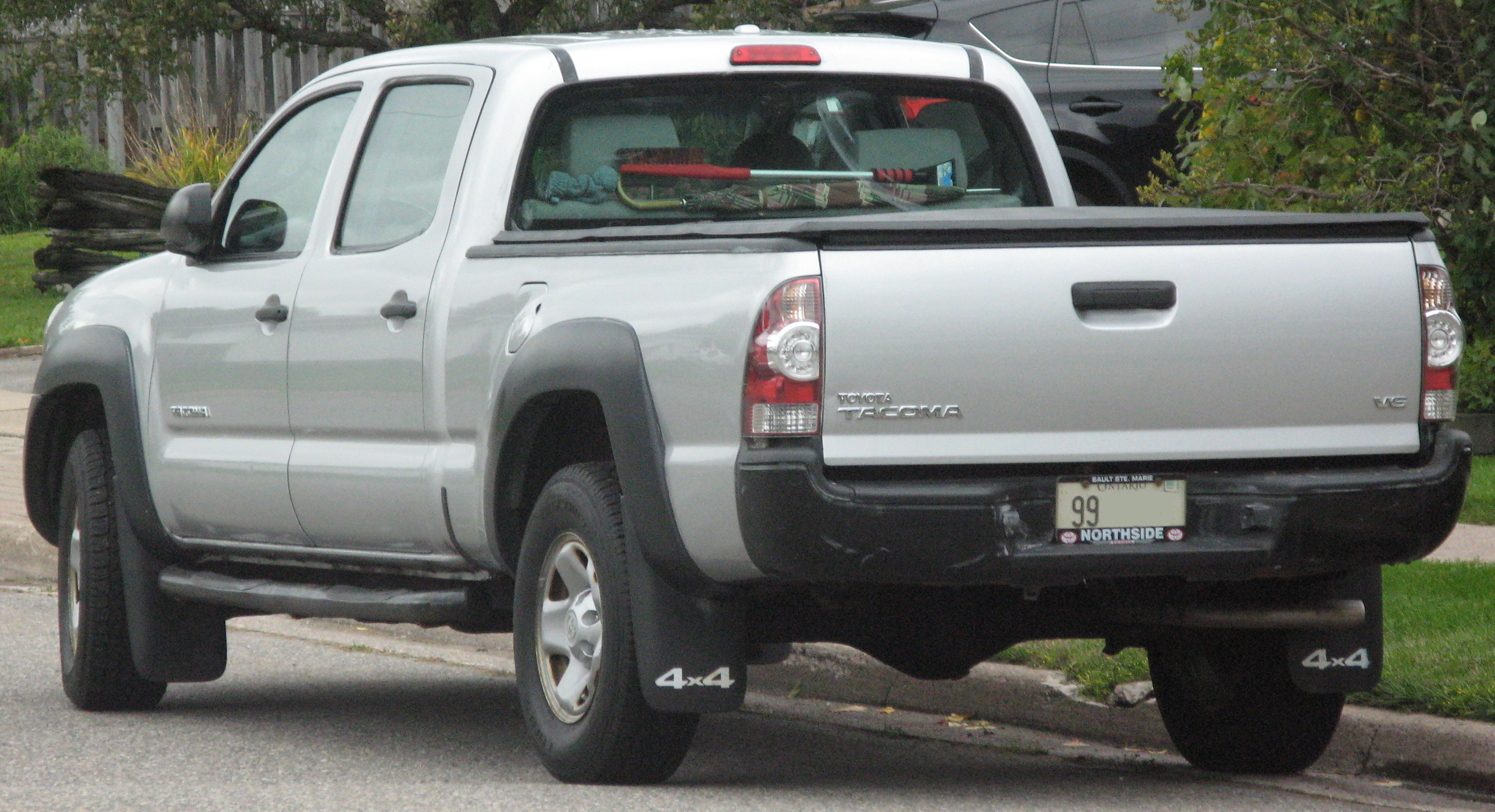
2010 model year Tacoma double cab long bed V6 (US)

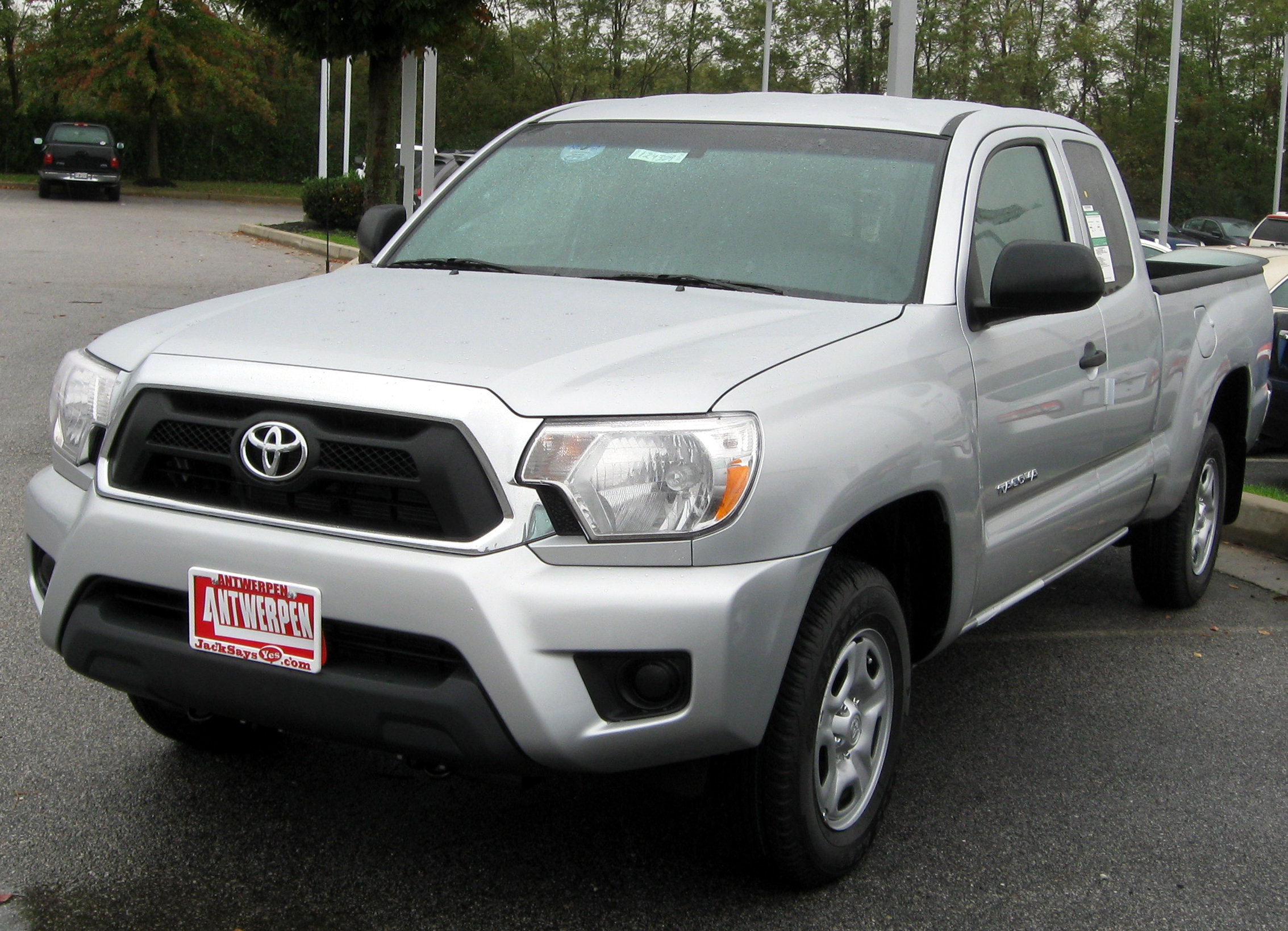
2012 model year Tacoma extended cab 4-cylinder (US)

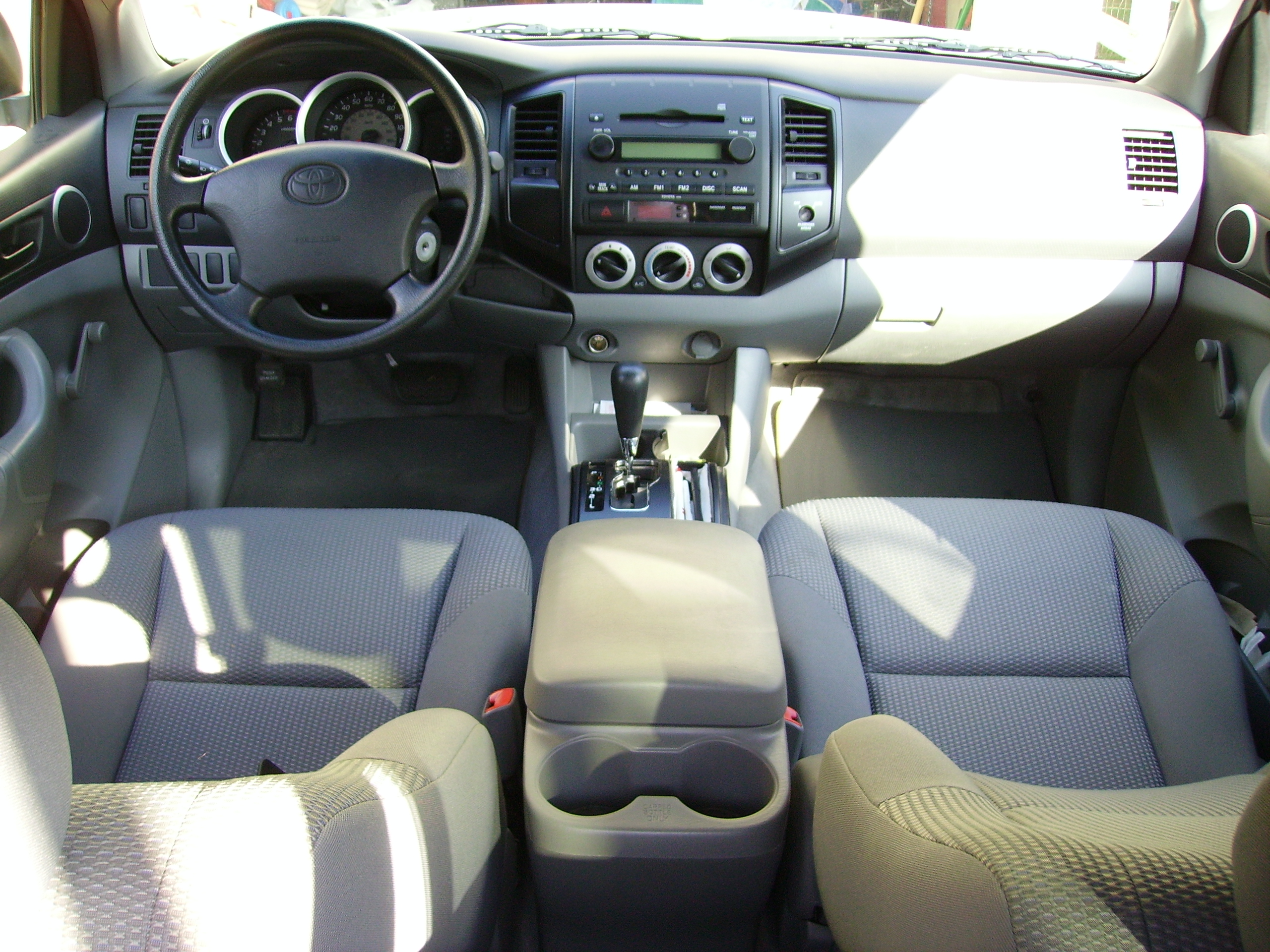
2006 model year Tacoma Interior

=== Technical ===
The three cab configurations consist of regular cab, access cab, and double cab. The transmissions come in 4-speed automatic, 5-speed automatic, 5-speed manual, and 6-speed manual. The Double Cab model is available with either the short bed, 60.3 in (5.0 ft; 1.5 m), or the long bed, 73.5 in (6.1 ft; 1.9 m); other models exclusively use the long bed.

The Tacoma's 4.0-liter 1GR-FE V6 took the place of the original 3.4-liter 5VZ-FE V6. The new V6 had many enhancements, such as a tow rating of 6,500 lb (2,948 kg), and a payload capacity of 1,650 lb (748 kg). The smaller, but all-new 2.7-liter 2TR-FE four-cylinder alternative in less expensive models is not as powerful, but also consumes fuel at a lower rate.

Toyota Tacoma (N2x0) drivetrain
Engine		Type	Maximum		Transmission				Fuel consumption (EPA)	
Engine		Type	Power	Torque	5-sp man	6-sp man	4-sp auto	5-sp auto	City	Hwy
2.7 L	2TR-FE	I4	164 hp (166 PS; 122 kW) @ 5200	183 lb⋅ft (248 N⋅m) @ 3800	Yes	No	Yes	No	20 mpg_{‑US} (11.8 L/100 km; 24.0 mpg_{‑imp})	27 mpg_{‑US} (8.7 L/100 km; 32.4 mpg_{‑imp}) (Note: 2WD with 5M transmission)
4.0 L	1GR-FE	V6	245 hp (248 PS; 183 kW) @ 5200	282 lb⋅ft (382 N⋅m) @ 3800	No	Yes	No	Yes	16 mpg_{‑US} (14.7 L/100 km; 19.2 mpg_{‑imp})	20 mpg_{‑US} (11.8 L/100 km; 24.0 mpg_{‑imp}) (Note: 4WD with 6M transmission)

=== Models and trims ===
Toyota also introduced an X-Runner trim, which replaces the slow selling S-Runner trim from the previous generation. The X-Runner features the 1GR-FE paired to a six-speed manual transmission, 18 in (457 mm) alloy wheels, is lowered two inches from the factory and included an X-Brace suspension package.

Toyota also included a Down-Hill Assist Control (DAC) and Hill-Start Assist Control (HAC), with models that were equipped with the optional TRD Off-Road package. DAC automatically applies braking during downhill descents while HAC prevents the vehicle from rolling backwards on hills. A rear locking differential, or limited-slip differential were also some optional features.

Every Tacoma was manufactured with a composite inner bed that includes a deck rail system with four tie down cleats, hook-pins, and storage boxes. TRD package equipped Tacomas also feature an in-bed 115 V/400 W AC power outlet. The tie down cleats are rated to hold up to 220 lb (100 kg).

==== TRD packages ====
The second generation Tacoma was offered in two TRD packages: Sport and Off-Road. The Sport was targeted more towards improved on-road performance, while the Off-Road was more geared towards the off-road enthusiast. Both were available in 2WD or 4WD, with rear electronic locking differential available only in the Off-Road model. Both variants came with TRD-specific seats, and 400-w AC power inverters mounted in the bed. A TRD supercharger for the 1GR-FE was a dealer-installed option. TRD offered a cold-air intake and cat-back exhaust system through Toyota dealerships. Also available were TRD cosmetic accessories such as aluminum front skid plate, along with shift knobs (A/T and M/T), radiator cap, oil filler cap, and exhaust tip. TRD also sold seat covers for these Tacomas, but these only fit the 2005–08 models (09-15 have airbags in the seats, 2005–08 do not).

The TRD Sport package sold in two levels. The first had a color-matched grille, color-matched front/rear bumpers/door handles/mirrors, and hood with nonfunctional scoop, Bilstein shocks/struts, stainless steel exhaust tip, and aluminum 17-in wheels with 265/65R17 tires. The second level also added a towing package (oil and transmission coolers, fan clutch) and heavy-duty high output alternator and battery. The 2005–08 model years came with a mechanical limited-slip differential. The 2009–15 model years have an open differential with a brake-assisted "automatic limited slip" rear differential, similar to a VSC system.

The basic TRD Off-Road package includes none of the color-matched body parts (black door handles/mirrors, chrome bumper/grille). Different from the off-road package, the Technology Package has color-matched body parts, aluminum 16-in wheels, Bilstein shocks, skid plates, and electronic locking rear differential but does not include the hood scoop from the Sport models. The off-road package included certain features that are useful for off-roading, while the Technology Package features include A-TRAC (2009–15), Hill Descent assist (automatic transmission only) and Hill Start assist (manual transmission only). Progressive-rate springs and smaller-diameter sway bars compared to the Sport package were included, giving the Off-Road more wheel articulation and a smoother ride, but allowing for more body roll. The towing package upgrades the battery, alternator, and fan clutch, and includes oil & transmission coolers (same as the Sport). All-terrain tires (265/70R16) and a heavy duty front tow hook complete the package.

===== TRD Extreme and T/X Baja =====
From model years 2011 to 2014, the 1500 Tacomas were offered in the T/X Baja package. This includes an upgraded, lifted suspension with Eibach springs and TRD Bilstein coil-overs at the front and TRD Bilstein reservoir shocks at the rear with an additional leaf spring. The bead-lock style wheels were wrapped in BF Goodrich All-terrain tires. The Baja model also includes a stainless steel TRD exhaust. The iconic Baja shift knob is also available for the six-speed manual transmission models.

===== TRD Pro =====
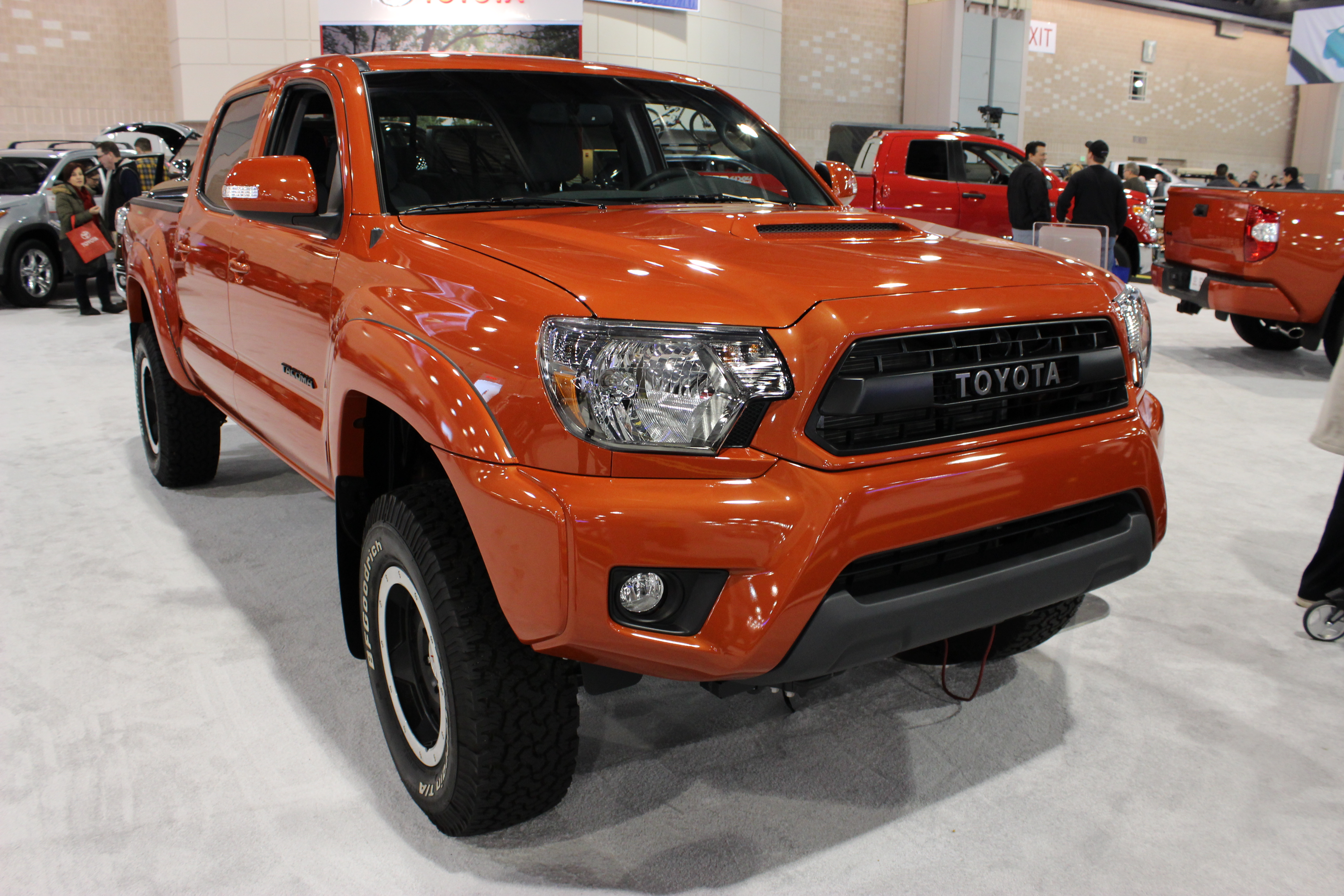
2015 TRD Pro Double Cab

The TRD Pro package was offered for 2015 models. Based on the TRD Off Road, the Pro package added a 2" front lift with Bilstein 2.5-inch front shocks and 2-inch rear shocks with remote reservoirs for extra wheel travel, BFGoodrich all-terrain tires on 16-inch black and silver bead-lock-style wheels, and TRD cat-back exhaust system. Cosmetic upgrades included the scooped Sport hood, black badges, blackout lighting elements, a TRD Pro matte-black grille with TOYOTA lettering, and various TRD-badged interior parts. About 1200 TRD Pro Tacomas were made.

===== Ironman edition =====
In 2008, an "Ironman" edition was released, named after Ivan "Ironman" Stewart. The engine output was increased to 304 hp (308 PS; 227 kW) and 334 ft⋅lb (453 N⋅m) with the addition of the TRD Supercharger and Magnaflow exhaust.

==== X-Runner ====
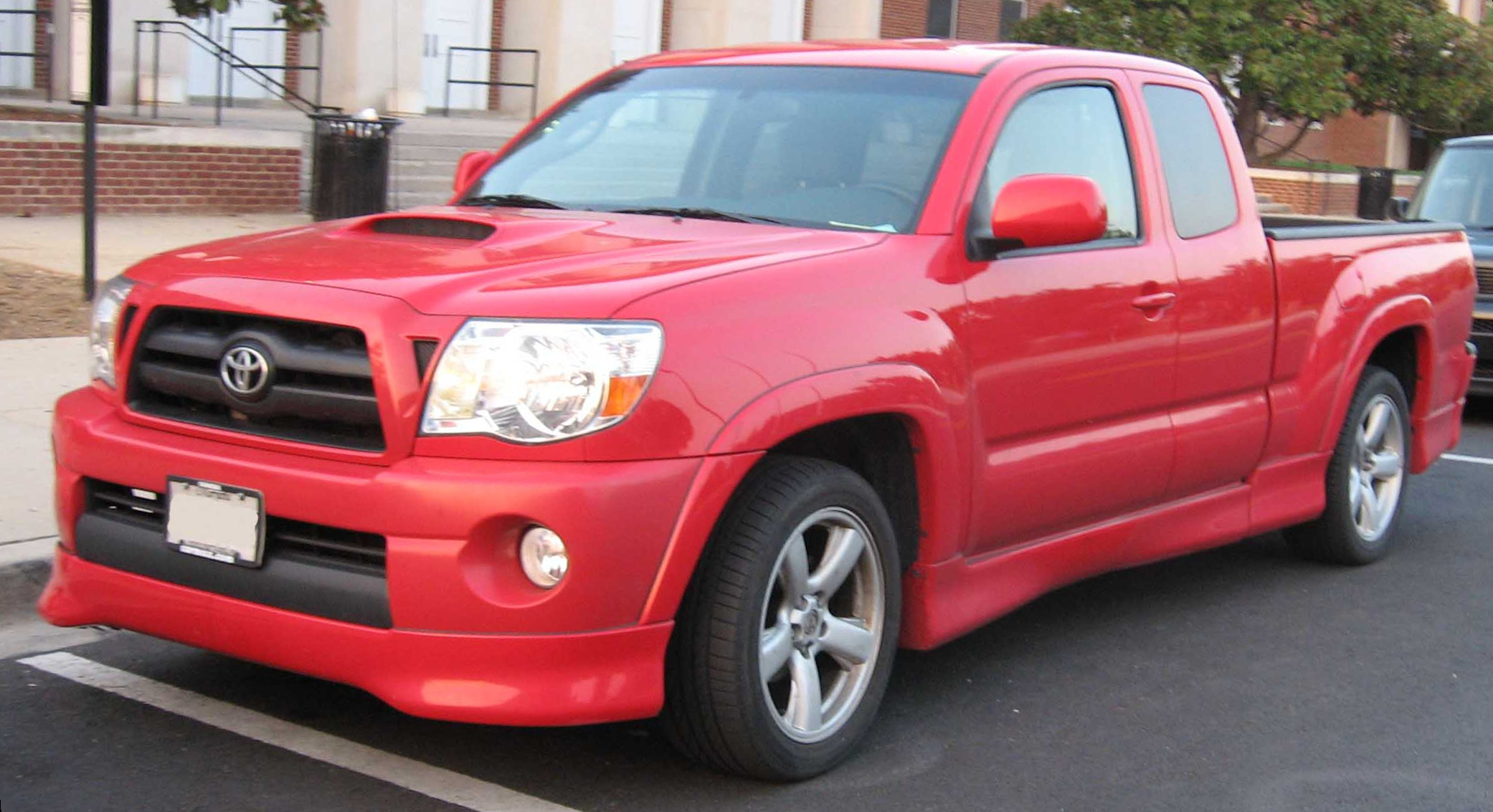
2005–2008 model year Tacoma X-Runner Access cab

The Toyota X-Runner was a limited production sport model. Although it utilizes the standard 4.0L and 6-speed manual from other Tacomas, the X-runner uses lowered double-wishbone suspension, Bilstein shocks and frame x-bracing.

The X-Runner is only available in three colors per year, and only five colors total. For the 2005 to 2008 model years, the X-Runner was available in Speedway Blue, Radiant Red and Black Sand Pearl. 2009 exchanged Radiant Red for Barcelona Red Metallic and Black Sand Pearl for Black. For the 2012 model year facelift, Speedway Blue became Nautical Blue Metallic and then Blue Ribbon Metallic for 2014/2015. The X-Runner was discontinued in the mainland US after the 2013 model year. The X-Runner was last offered in Canada for the 2014 model year and in Hawaii (USA) for the 2014/2015 model years.

Key differences between the X-Runner and the other packages include tweaks to the suspension, hood scoop, ground effects kit, driving lights, sports wheel and tires, and a 3.15 final drive ratio (3.73 for V6 PreRunner and 4X4). Toyota added a rear-mounted X-Brace to stiffen up the rear end (hence the name X-Runner). The chassis was further stiffened by adding two more support braces to the frame. An optional big brake kit by TRD is also available on the X-Runner; which consists of a 332 mm slotted rotor and 4 piston caliper. The BBK (big brake kit) was designed by StopTech. To further its track and sport appeal, TRD also offered a dealer-installed and warrantied roots-style supercharger which raised the power from 236 to 300 hp (239 to 304 PS; 176 to 224 kW) and the torque was raised from 266 to 345 lbf⋅ft (361 to 468 N⋅m). A factory TRD composite spoiler was also an option but originals are rare. The X-Runner comes only with an Aisin RA60 6-speed manual transmission.

Production numbers are unknown but it is believed roughly 3,000 X-runners were made each model year.

=== Production ===
The second generation Tacomas were assembled in Tijuana, Mexico and Fremont, California while the plastic/composite beds were all built in Mexico. After the bankruptcy of GM, GM ended its joint venture with Toyota. Toyota, needing additional production volume at its Texas and Mississippi plants, ended Corolla and Tacoma production at the Fremont plant. In 2010 U.S. production was moved to Toyota's Texas plant in San Antonio alongside the Tundra. This brought a total of approximately 1,000 new jobs to San Antonio.

=== Safety and structural integrity ===
The Tacoma comes standard with anti-lock brakes, brake assist, and electronic brakeforce distribution. For 2008, a rollover sensor was added which would deploy the side curtain airbags in the event of rollover in Tacomas equipped with the optional side airbags. Beginning with the 2009 model year, all Tacomas feature Toyota's Star Safety System which added Vehicle Stability Control and traction control. Front row side torso airbags and side curtain airbags for both rows also become standard as well as active head restraints.

Given the smaller size of pickup trucks in the Tacoma's category, crash testing for these sized trucks lags with how well most full size trucks perform. However, in an Insurance Institute for Highway Safety (IIHS) test of the Tacoma and other small trucks, only the side airbag equipped Tacoma received the highest overall rating of "Good" in the side impact test. The Tacoma also is rated "Good" in the frontal offset crash test. In 2009 with the active head restraints the Tacoma is given the IIHS's Top Safety Pick award.

NHTSA crash test ratings (2006):
Frontal Driver	5/5 stars
Frontal Passenger	5/5 stars
Side Driver	5/5 stars
Side Rear Passenger	5/5 stars
Rollover	4/5 stars

== Third generation (N240/N260/N300/N310/N320/N330; 2015) ==
Third generation
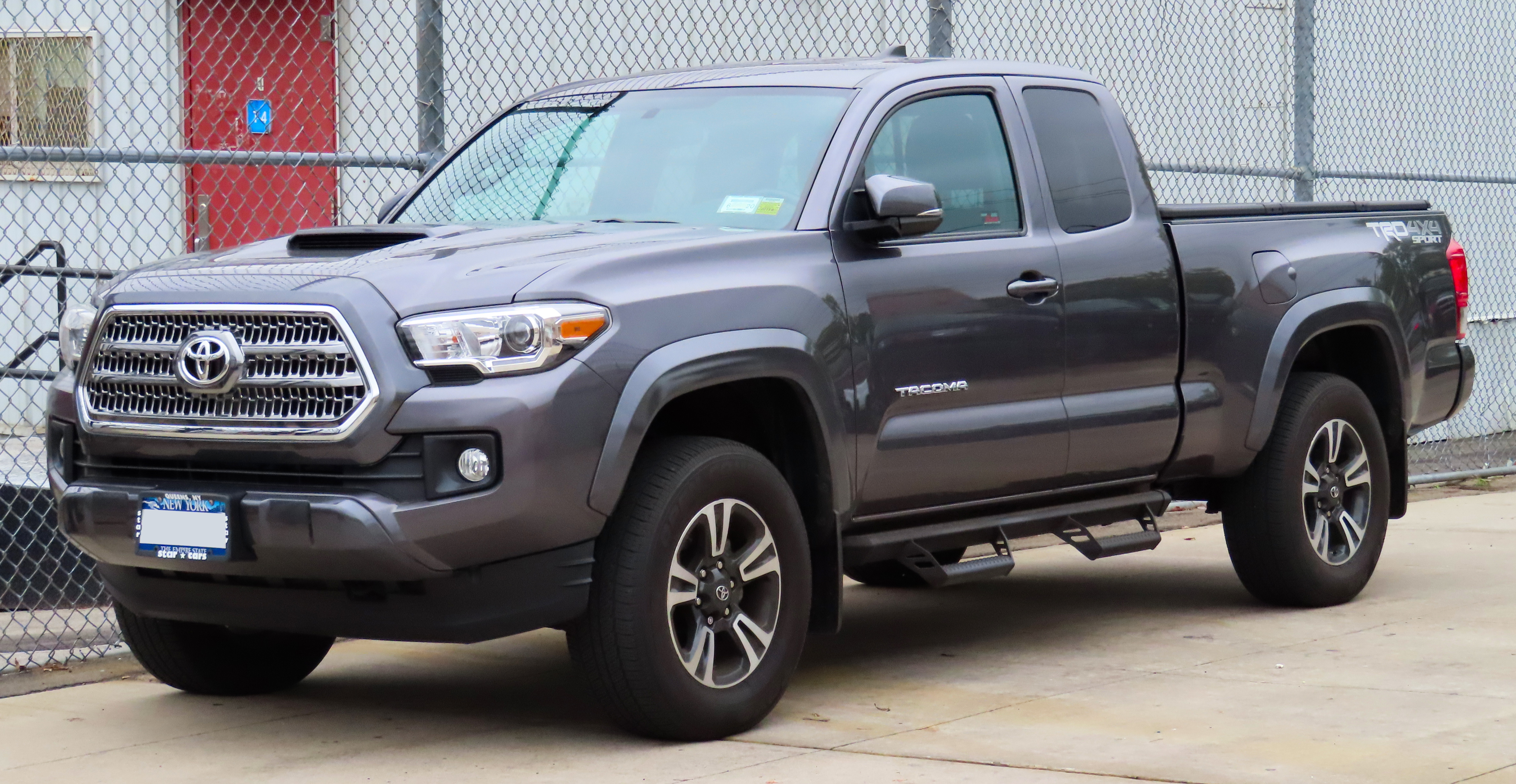
- 2016 Toyota Tacoma TRD Sport Access Cab (pre-facelift)

Overview
- Model code: N240; N260; N300; N310; N320; N330
- Production: August 2015–2023
- Model years: 2016–2023
- Assembly: Mexico: Apaseo el Grande (TMMGT, 2020–2023); Tijuana (TMMBC); United States: San Antonio, Texas (TMMTX, 2015–2021)
- Designer: Kevin Hunter (2011)

Body and chassis
- Body style: 4-door extended cab; 4-door crew cab
- Platform: Toyota F2
- Related: Toyota 4Runner (N280)

Powertrain
- Engine: Gasoline: 2.7 L 2TR-FE I4; 3.5 L 2GR-FKS V6
- Power output: 159 hp (161 PS; 119 kW) (2TR-FE); 278 hp (282 PS; 207 kW) (2GR-FKS)
- Transmission: 5-speed manual (R156, 2016–2017 2.7 L); 6-speed automatic (AC60E/F); 6-speed manual (RC62F)

Dimensions
- Wheelbase: Access Cab: 127.4 in (3,236 mm); Double Cab, Short Bed: 127.4 in (3,236 mm); Double Cab, Long Bed: 140.6 in (3,571 mm)
- Length: Access Cab: 212.3 in (5,392 mm); Double Cab, Short Bed: 212.3 in (5,392 mm); Double Cab, Long Bed: 225.5 in (5,728 mm)
- Width: 74.4–75.2 in (1,890–1,910 mm)
- Height: 70.6 in (1,793 mm)
- Curb weight: 4,425–4,480 lb (2,007–2,032 kg)

The new Tacoma was officially unveiled at the January 2015 North American International Auto Show, with sales in the United States beginning on September 10, 2015. Dimensionally and mechanically, the third generation Tacoma is similar to the preceding generation. While the four-cylinder models retained their N240/260 series codes, the V6 variants were reassigned to the new N300 series.

=== Styling ===
The truck features a revised exterior design inspired by the 2014 model year 4Runner SUV and Tundra pickup. Changes include a larger grille, new projector-beam headlamps, and a redesigned tailgate and bed with an integrated spoiler and debossed Tacoma logo.

The N300 Tacoma is available in Access Cab and Double Cab configurations, offering long or short bed sizes. The Regular Cab model was discontinued for the new generation. The Access Cab comes with a single bed option measuring 73.7 inches (187 cm), while the Double Cab has a standard bed length of 60.5 inches (154 cm), with the 73.7-inch (187 cm) bed available as an option.

For the interior of the Tacoma, Toyota incorporated a handlebar theme and introduced a larger touchscreen display and a new instrument panel. The previous generation's hard plastics were replaced with soft-touch materials, and a leather option was introduced. Toyota improved sound insulation with an acoustic windshield, better insulated doors, and additional weather stripping to reduce road and wind noise. Dual climate control was introduced for the first time in the Tacoma.

Unlike the second-generation models, the 2016 and 2017 Tacoma steering wheel controls had reduced functionality, limiting convenience when browsing phone contacts or selecting songs. The steering wheel D-pad controls were no longer linked to the Entune system for browsing and selecting contacts or scrolling through music lists. Instead, drivers had to rely on voice controls or use the center console display's capacitive touchscreen. These limitations were removed starting with the 2018 model year.

==== 2020 facelift ====
In the 2020 model year, the Tacoma received a facelift, which included exterior updates.

Inside, new technologies were introduced, including wired Apple CarPlay, Android Auto, and Amazon Alexa capability. The SR5 model and higher trims featured a power-adjustable driver's seat, while the Tacoma Limited Double Cab offered a new Panoramic View Monitor providing a 360-degree bird's-eye view of the truck's surroundings.

=== Technical ===
Toyota offered a 2.7-liter 2TR-FE I4 engine paired with a 5-speed manual (MY2016-17) or 6-speed automatic transmission, and a 3.5-liter 2GR-FKS V6 engine paired with a 6-speed manual or 6-speed automatic transmission. The 3.5-liter V6 can run on a simulated Atkinson cycle using VVT-iW, and feature Toyota's D-4S system which allows it to switch from port injection to direct injection based on driving conditions.

Toyota Tacoma (N300) drivetrain
Engine		Type	Maximum		Transmission			Fuel consumption (EPA)		
Engine		Type	Power	Torque	5-sp man	6-sp man	6-sp auto	City	Highway	Combined
2.7 L	2TR-FE	I4	159 hp (161 PS; 119 kW) @ 5,200 rpm	180 lb⋅ft (244 N⋅m) @ 3800	Yes	No	Yes	20 mpg_{‑US} (11.8 L/100 km; 24.0 mpg_{‑imp})	23 mpg_{‑US} (10.2 L/100 km; 27.6 mpg_{‑imp})	21 mpg_{‑US} (11.2 L/100 km; 25.2 mpg_{‑imp}) (Note: 2WD with 6A transmission)
3.5 L	2GR-FKS	V6	278 hp (207 kW) @ 6,000 rpm	265 lb⋅ft (359 N⋅m) @ 4600	No	Yes	Yes	17 mpg_{‑US} (13.8 L/100 km; 20.4 mpg_{‑imp})	21 mpg_{‑US} (11.2 L/100 km; 25.2 mpg_{‑imp})	18 mpg_{‑US} (13.1 L/100 km; 21.6 mpg_{‑imp}) (Note: 4WD with 6M transmission)

Notes

Based on the SAE J2807 tow guidelines the Tacoma can tow up to 6,800 lb (3,100 kg) with the added tow package.

Similar wheelbase lengths of 127.4 in (3,240 mm) (Access Cab and Double Cab with short bed) and 140.6 in (3,570 mm) (Double Cab with long bed) were carried over from the preceding generation. In addition, Toyota updated the truck's frame by adding more high-strength steel in order to increase the truck's rigidity and to drop weight. The body was also constructed using ultra-high-strength steel integrated using a new hot stamping process that reduces weight. Toyota also updated the suspensions, rear differentials, and rear axle to improve the truck's road manners while still keeping it off-road capable. 2WD and 4WD models share the same suspension height and ground clearance.

==== TRD Lift Kit ====
In January 2021, the Tacoma TRD Lift Kit was made available as a dealer-installed option for 2020 and newer Tacoma models. The kit included Bilstein shocks fitted with TRD red dust boots and "Tuned by TRD" graphics. Total frame ground clearance increases by 1.7 inches (43.2 mm) with the suspension lift kit.

=== Trims ===
The truck is available in 6 trim levels: base SR, mid-level SR5, TRD Off-Road, TRD Sport, Limited, and range-topping TRD Pro.

The TRD Off-Road trim models feature an all-new terrain select mode which allows the driver to choose between different types of terrain such as: loose rock, mud, and sand. Toyota also announced a new Crawl mode that will allow the driver to steer the truck in tough terrain while the truck manages braking and acceleration by itself. In addition to this the truck also features a moonroof, keyless entry, Qi Wireless phone charging capability, easy lower tailgate, blind-spot monitoring system, backup camera (standard) and a mounted GoPro holder (standard).

Toyota also introduced a TRD Pro version in late 2016 for the 2017 model year, which comes with FOX-patented Internal Bypass shocks, TRD Pro catback exhaust, TRD Pro skid plate, Rigid Industries LED fog lights, and heritage inspired 'TOYOTA' grille. The 2017 model year TRD Pro was only available in the double cab short bed configuration, with either a manual or automatic gearbox in Barcelona Red Metallic, Super White, or Cement. Black leather with red accents and stitching is the only available interior option. For the 2018 model year TRD Pro, Midnight Black Metallic and Cavalry Blue are new available exterior colors, with Barcelona Red Metallic and Cement discontinued. In 2021, for the 2022 model year, the 'Trail' special edition was introduced in Army Green, with Lunar Rock color following in 2022. Heritage-inspired bronze color wheels and grille pay homage to earlier 4WD Toyota pickups.

=== Production ===
The Tacoma's transition to its third generation took place while the segment was growing. In 2014, the San Antonio plant built 105,796 Tacomas and the Baja plant built 71,399 for a total of 177,195. In 2015, the San Antonio plant built 110,911 and Baja built 82,328 for a total of 193,239 built. In 2016, 191,673 Tacomas were sold in the US and Canada (along with 115,489 Tundras also built in San Antonio) and, with the mid size segment up overall, the San Antonio plant was running costlier extra Saturday shifts to keep up with demand, running at 125 percent of projected plant capacity. The 2016 and 2017 model year double-cab short-bed Tacomas were made in Tijuana (VINs starting in 3) and all other configurations were made in San Antonio (VINs starting in 5). In 2016, Toyota USA announced it intended to increase 2018 production at the Tijuana plant from about 100,000 to 160,000.

=== Gallery ===
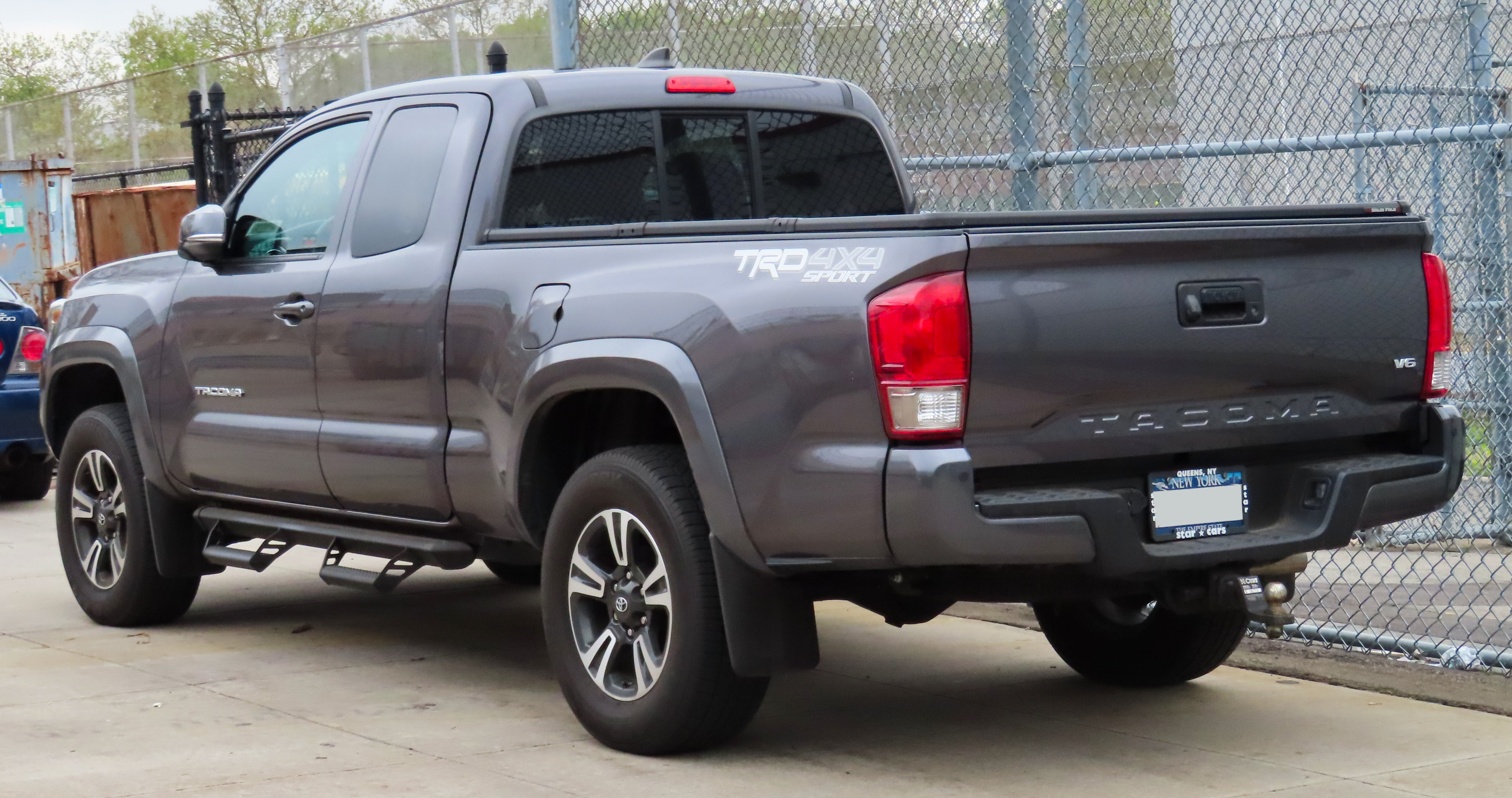
Rear view (pre-facelift)

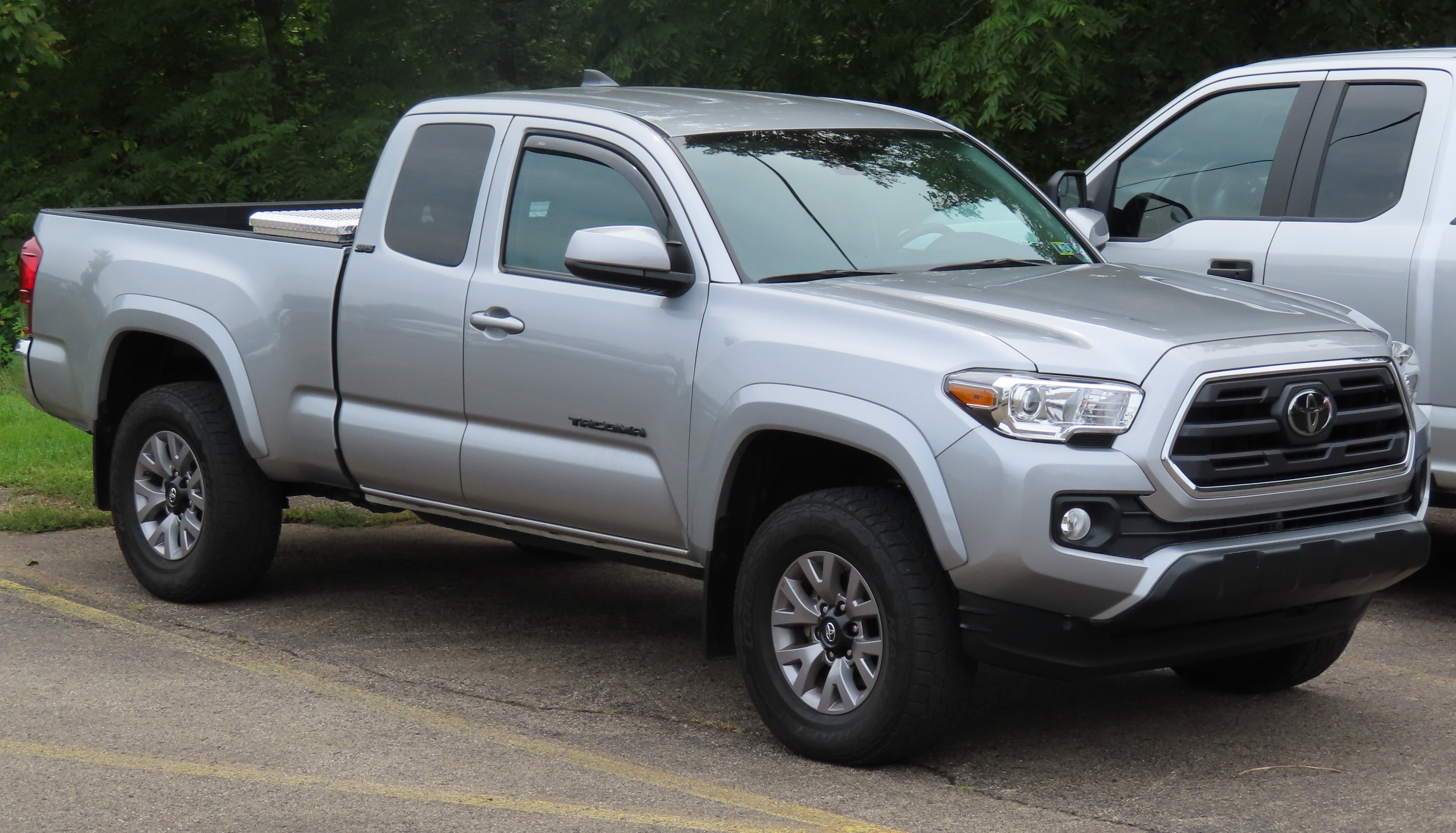
2019 Toyota Tacoma SR5 4WD Access Cab (pre-facelift)

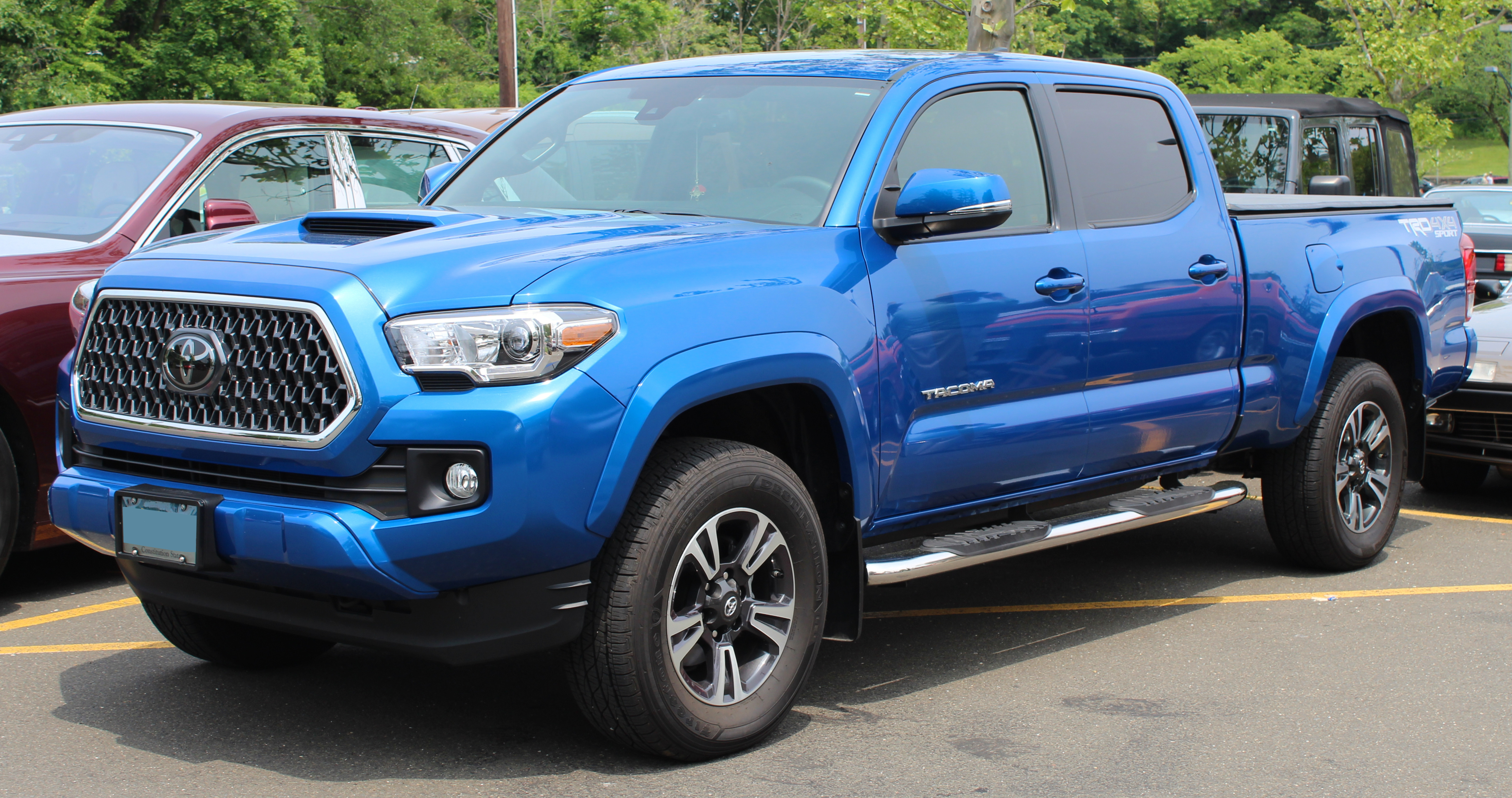
2018 Toyota Tacoma TRD Sport Double Cab Long Bed (2018 minor update)

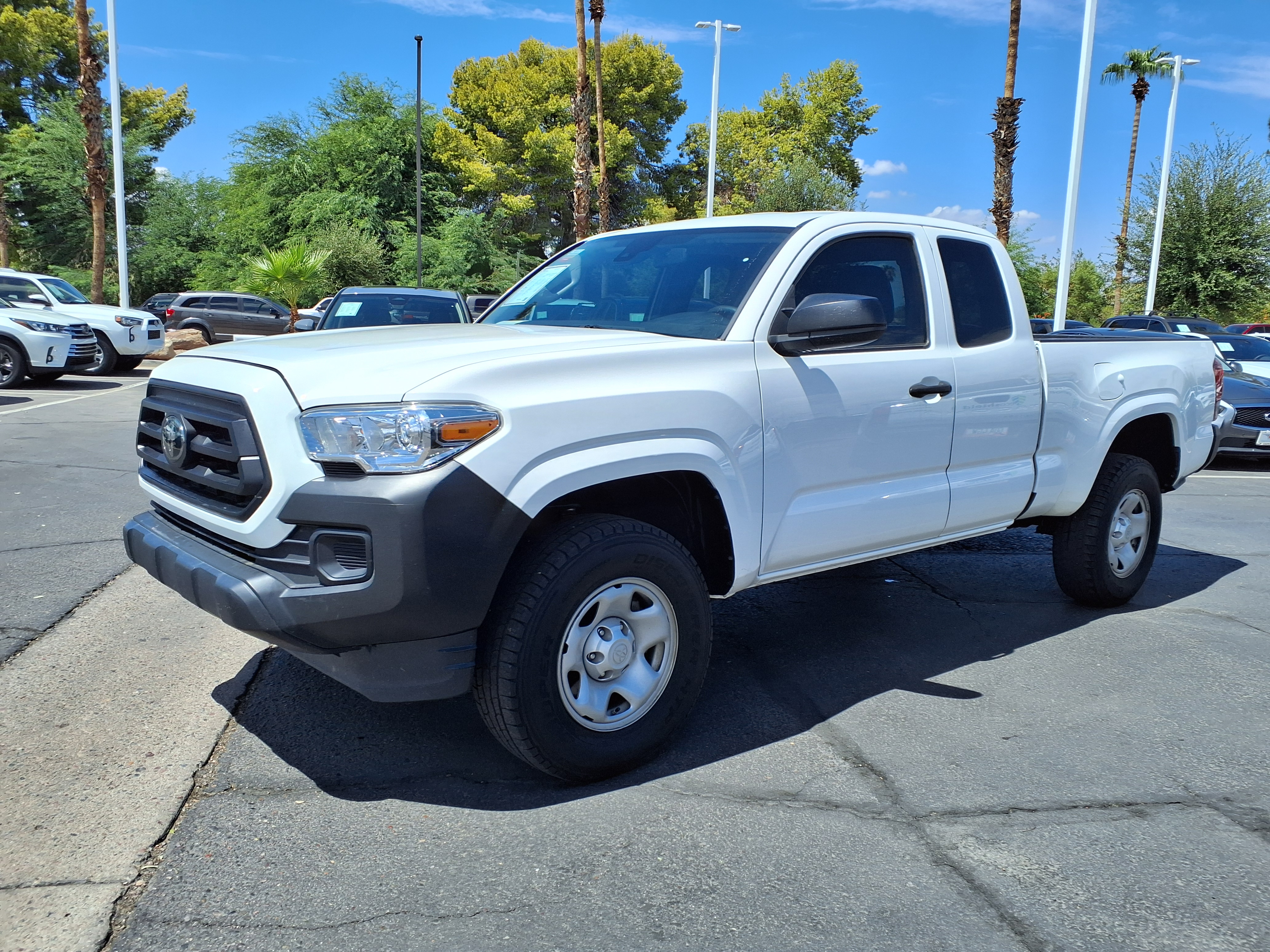
2022 Toyota Tacoma SR Access Cab (facelift)

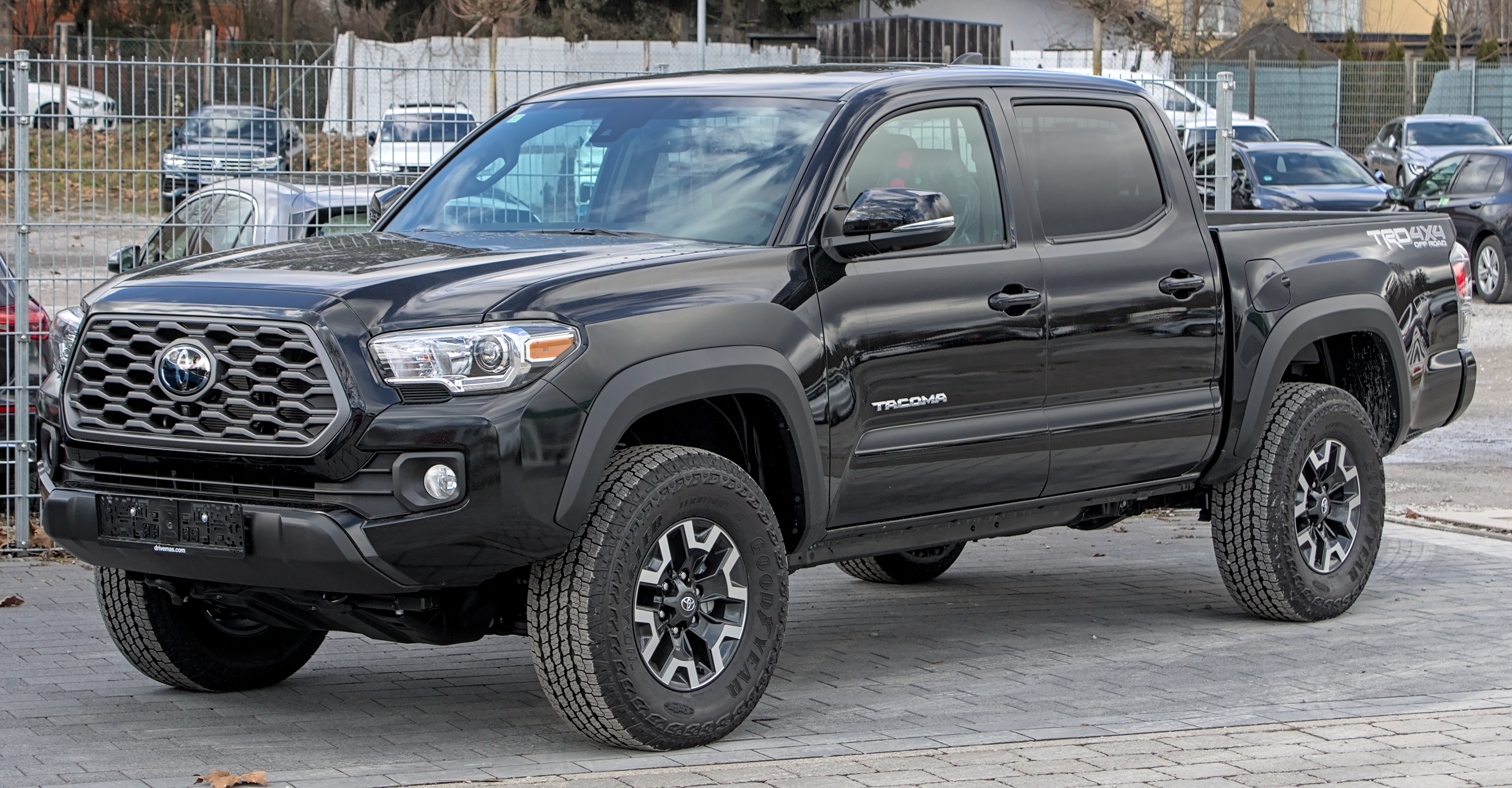
Toyota Tacoma TRD Off-Road Double Cab Short Bed (facelift)

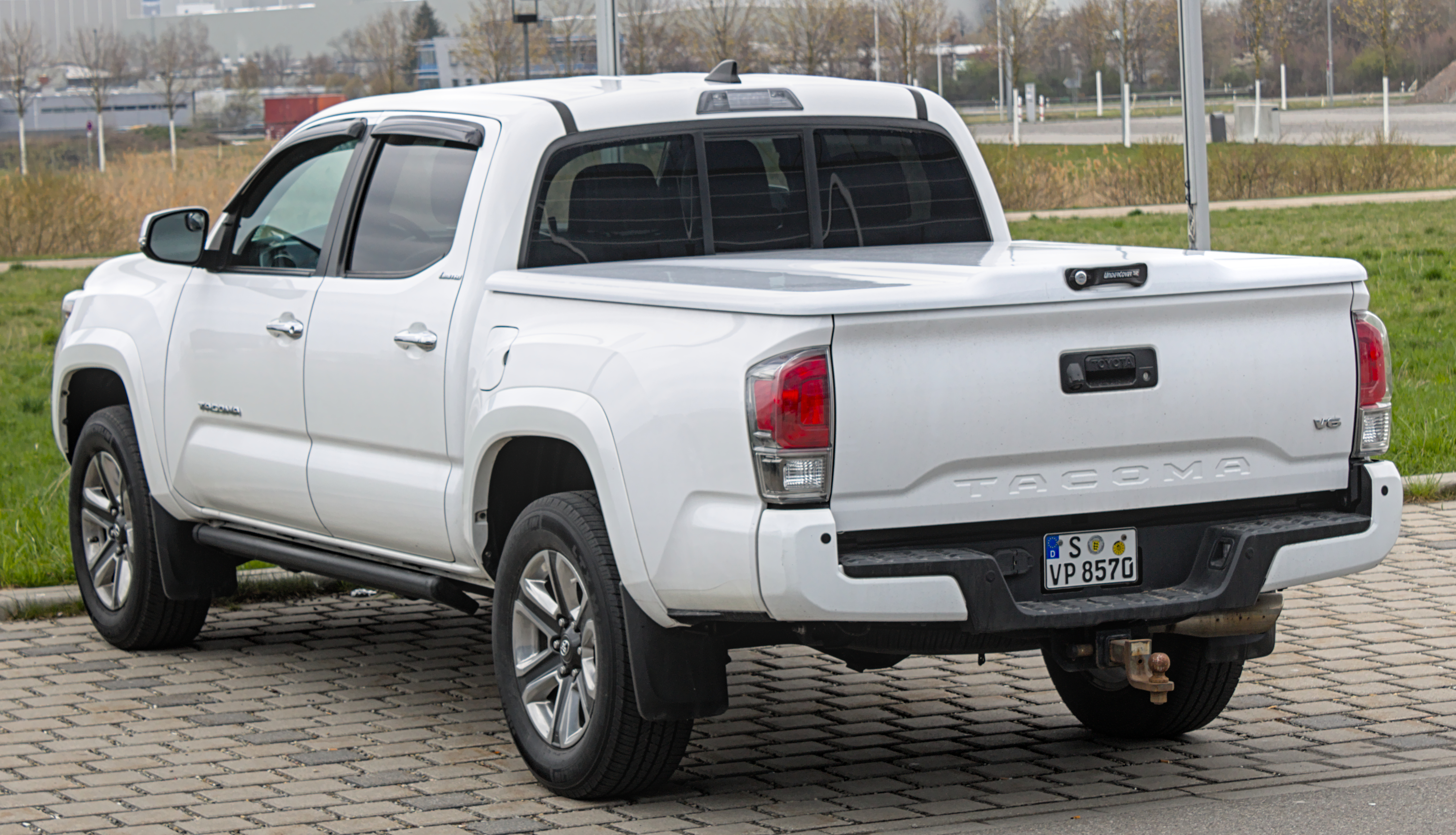
Rear view (facelift)

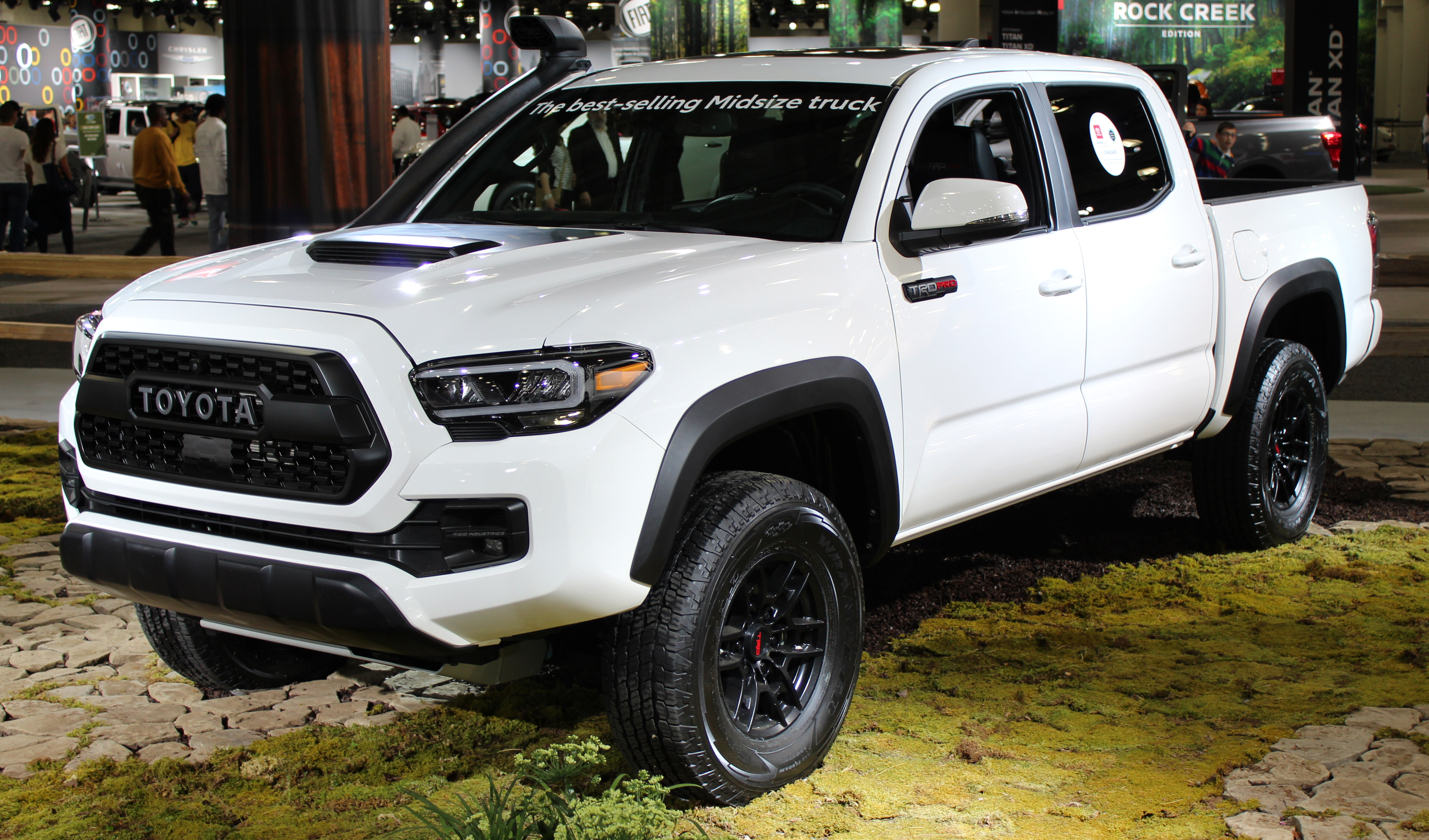
2020 Toyota Tacoma TRD Pro

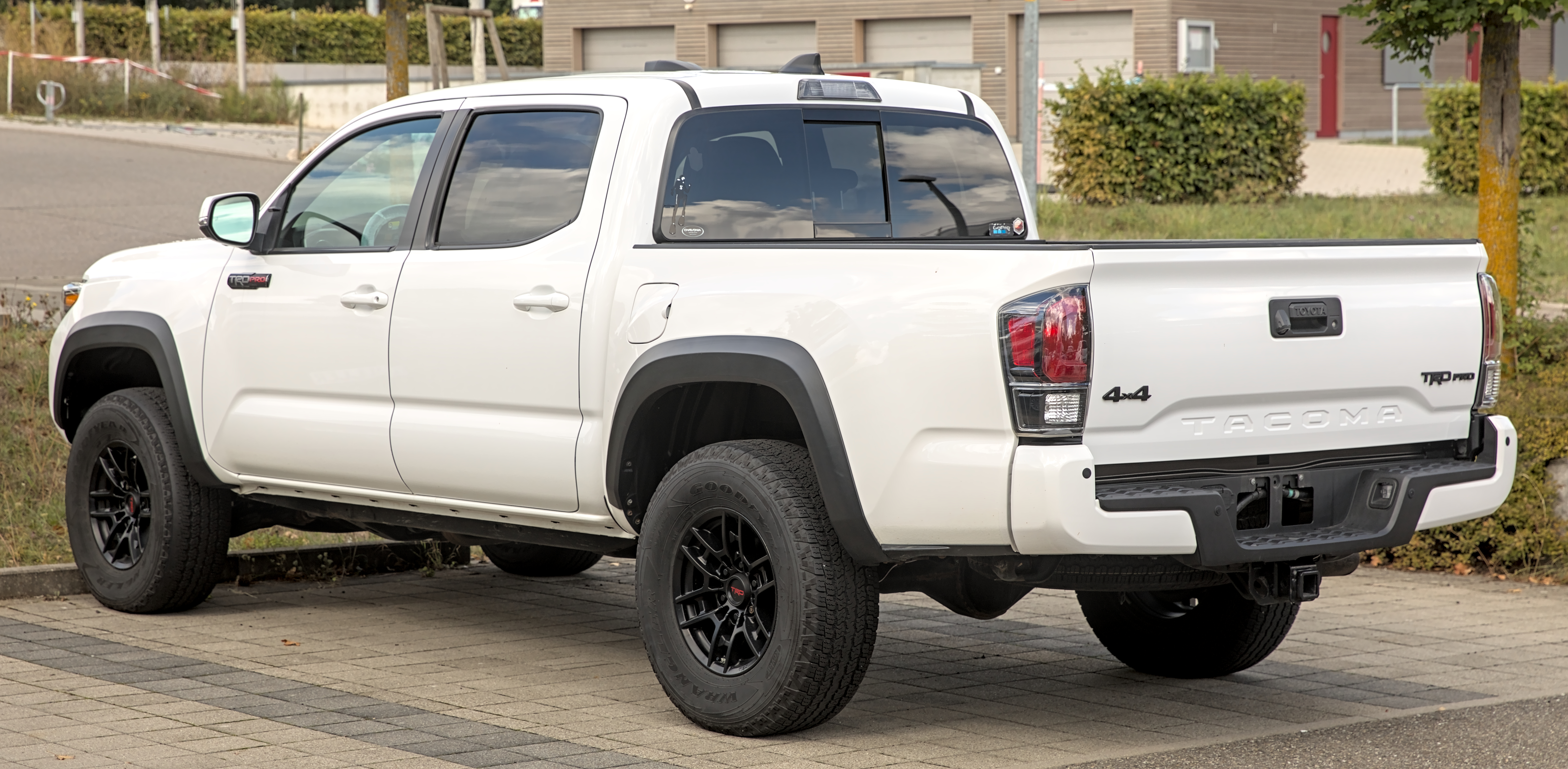
2020 Toyota Tacoma TRD Pro

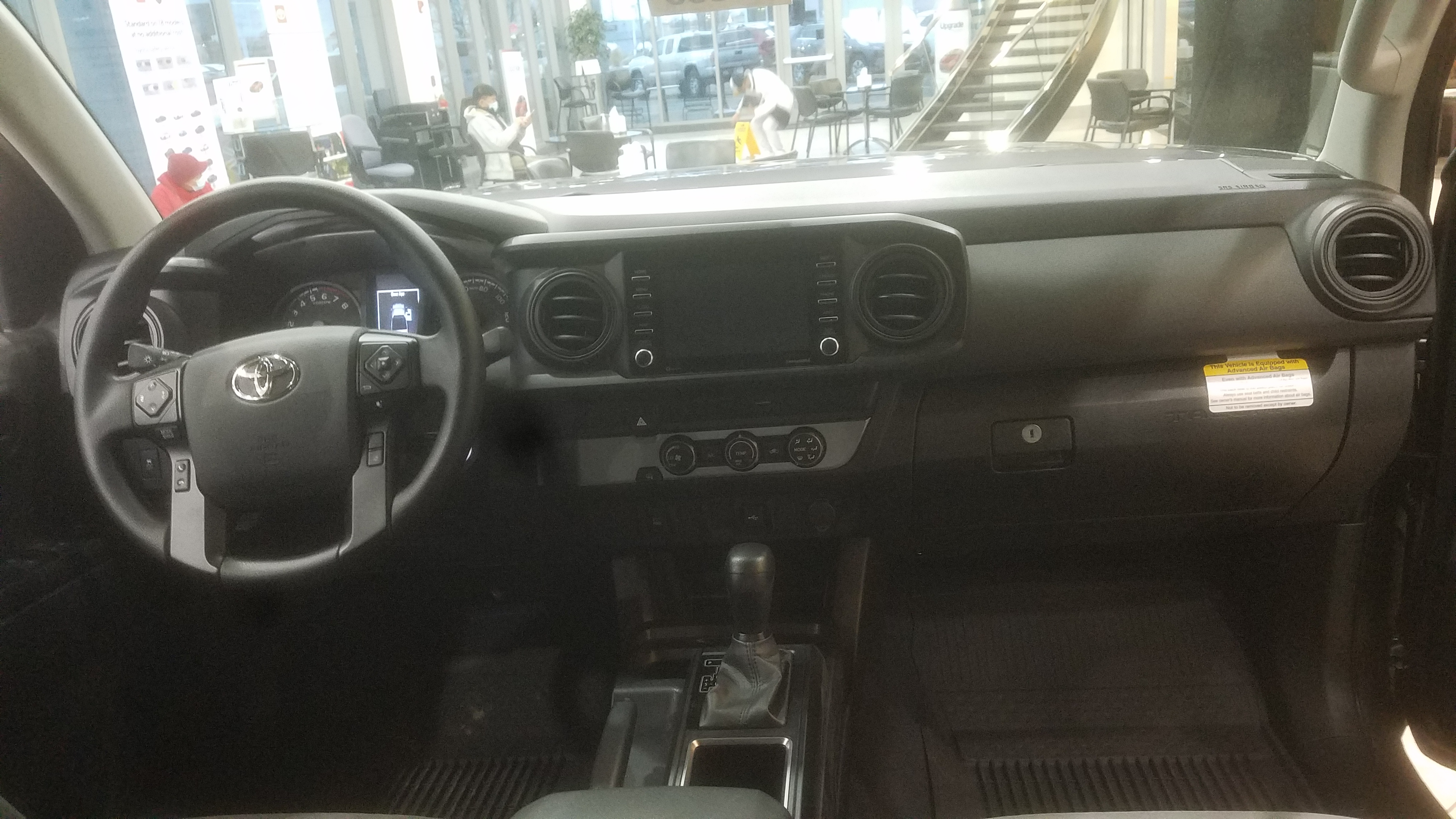
Interior

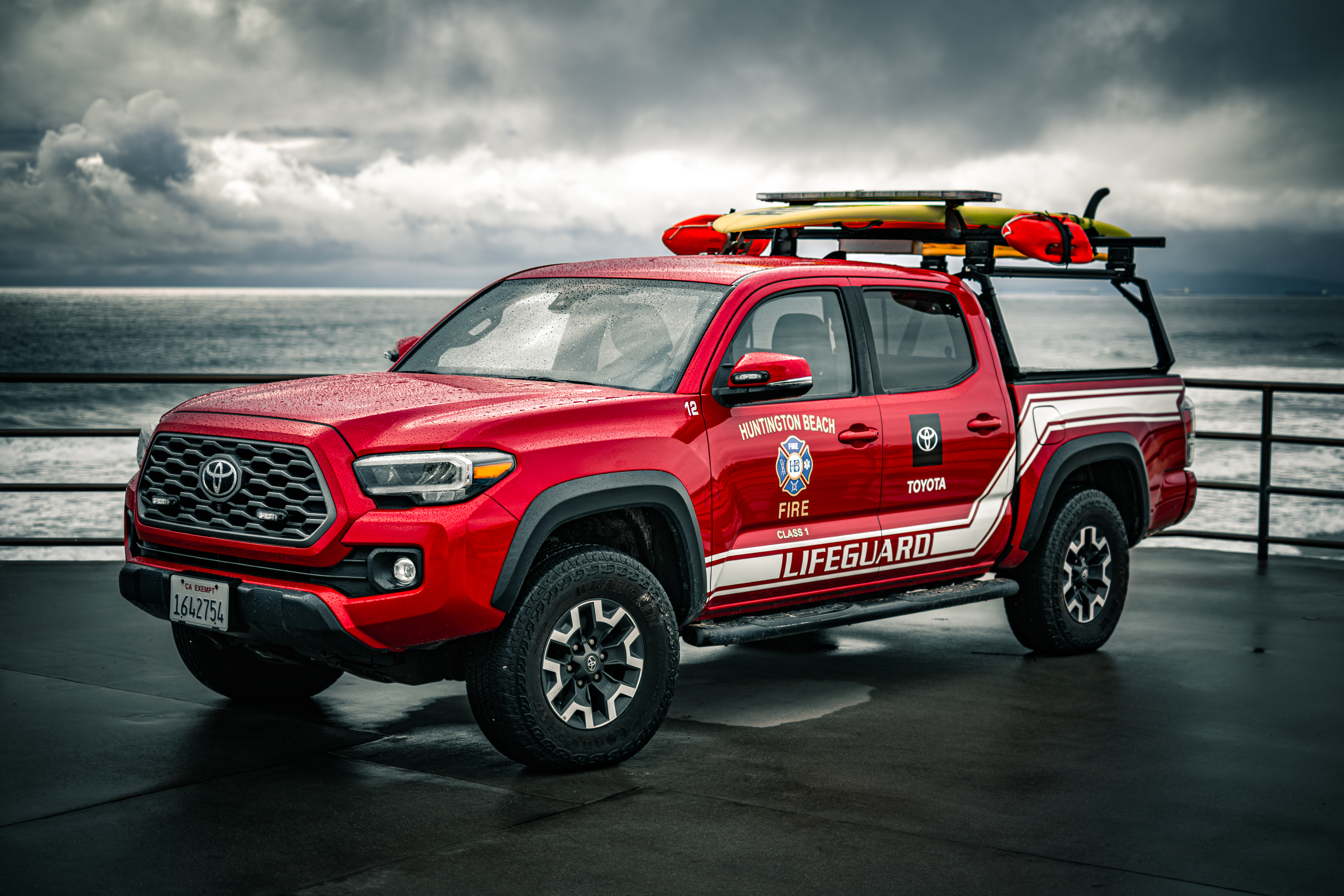
Lifeguard truck

=== Safety ===
The 2022 Tacoma was tested by the IIHS:

IIHS scores
2022 Tacoma cab variants	Double Cab	Access Cab
Small overlap front (Driver)	Good	
Small overlap front (Passenger)	Acceptable	Marginal
Moderate overlap front	Good	
Side (original test)	Good	
Side (updated test)	Marginal	Not retested
Roof strength	Good	
Head restraints and seats	Good	
Headlights (varies by trim/option)	Good/Marginal	
Front crash prevention (Vehicle-to-Vehicle)	Superior	
Front crash prevention (Vehicle-to-Pedestrian, day)	Advanced	
Seat belt reminders	Marginal	Not Rated
Child seat anchors (LATCH) ease of use	Marginal	

== Fourth generation (N400; 2023) ==
Fourth generation
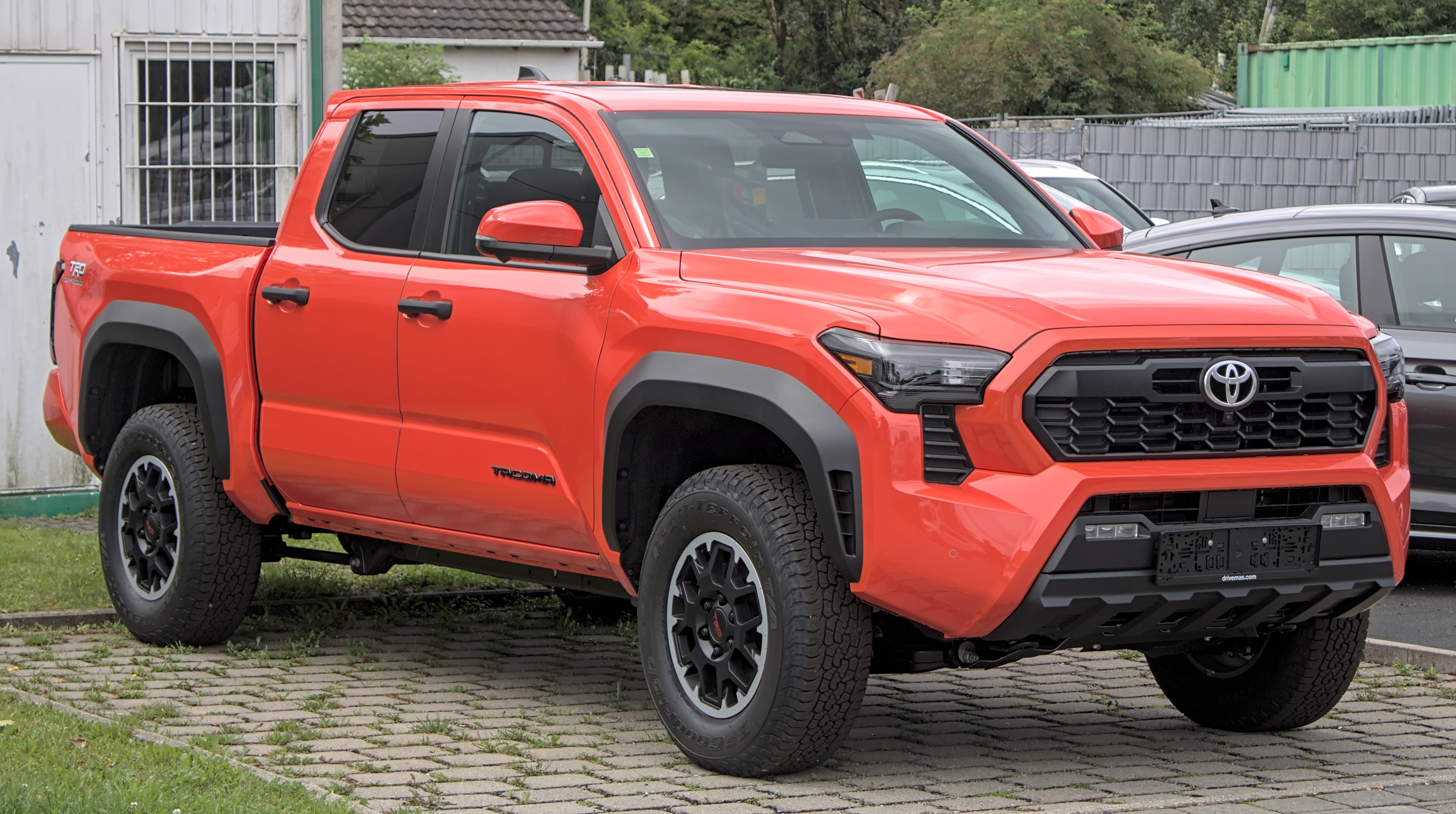
- 2024 Toyota Tacoma TRD Off Road

Overview
- Model code: N400
- Production: December 2023 – present
- Model years: 2024–present
- Assembly: Mexico: Apaseo el Grande (TMMGT); Tijuana (TMMBC); Argentina: Zárate (Toyota Argentina S.A.)
- Designer: Adam Rabinowitz

Body and chassis
- Body style: 2-door extended cab; 4-door crew cab
- Platform: TNGA: GA-F
- Related: Toyota 4Runner (N500); Toyota Land Cruiser Prado (J250); Lexus GX (J250)

Powertrain
- Engine: Gasoline: 2.4 L T24A-FTS turbo I4; Gasoline hybrid: 2.4 L T24A-FTS turbo I4
- Power output: 228–278 hp (170–207 kW; 231–282 PS); 326 hp (243 kW; 331 PS) (hybrid, combined system)
- Transmission: 6-speed manual (RC60F); 8-speed automatic (AL80E/F)
- Hybrid drivetrain: Parallel (i-Force Max)
- Battery: 1.87 kWh, 6.5 Ah, 288 V NiMH
- Plug-in charging: V2L: 2.4kW (hybrid), 0.4kW (petrol)

Dimensions
- Wheelbase: 131.9–145.1 in (3,350–3,686 mm)
- Length: 213–226.2 in (5,410–5,745 mm)
- Width: 76.9–79.9 in (1,953–2,029 mm)
- Height: 73.9–74.6 in (1,877–1,895 mm)
- Curb weight: 4,145–5,410 lb (1,880–2,454 kg)

The fourth-generation Toyota Tacoma was revealed on May 19, 2023. It is built on Toyota's TNGA-F global body-on-frame vehicle platform, shared with the larger Toyota Tundra (XK70). The Tacoma was designed by teams at Toyota's Calty Design Research facilities in California and Michigan with the intention "to be authentic to the way our customers use their trucks for rugged outdoor fun", according to Calty president Kevin Hunter, who explained the truck was styled with "the iconic Tacoma look, referred to as 'Tacoma-ness'", including "high lift, big tires, slim body, and a powerful athletic stance" as inspired by prior Toyota Baja trophy racing trucks.

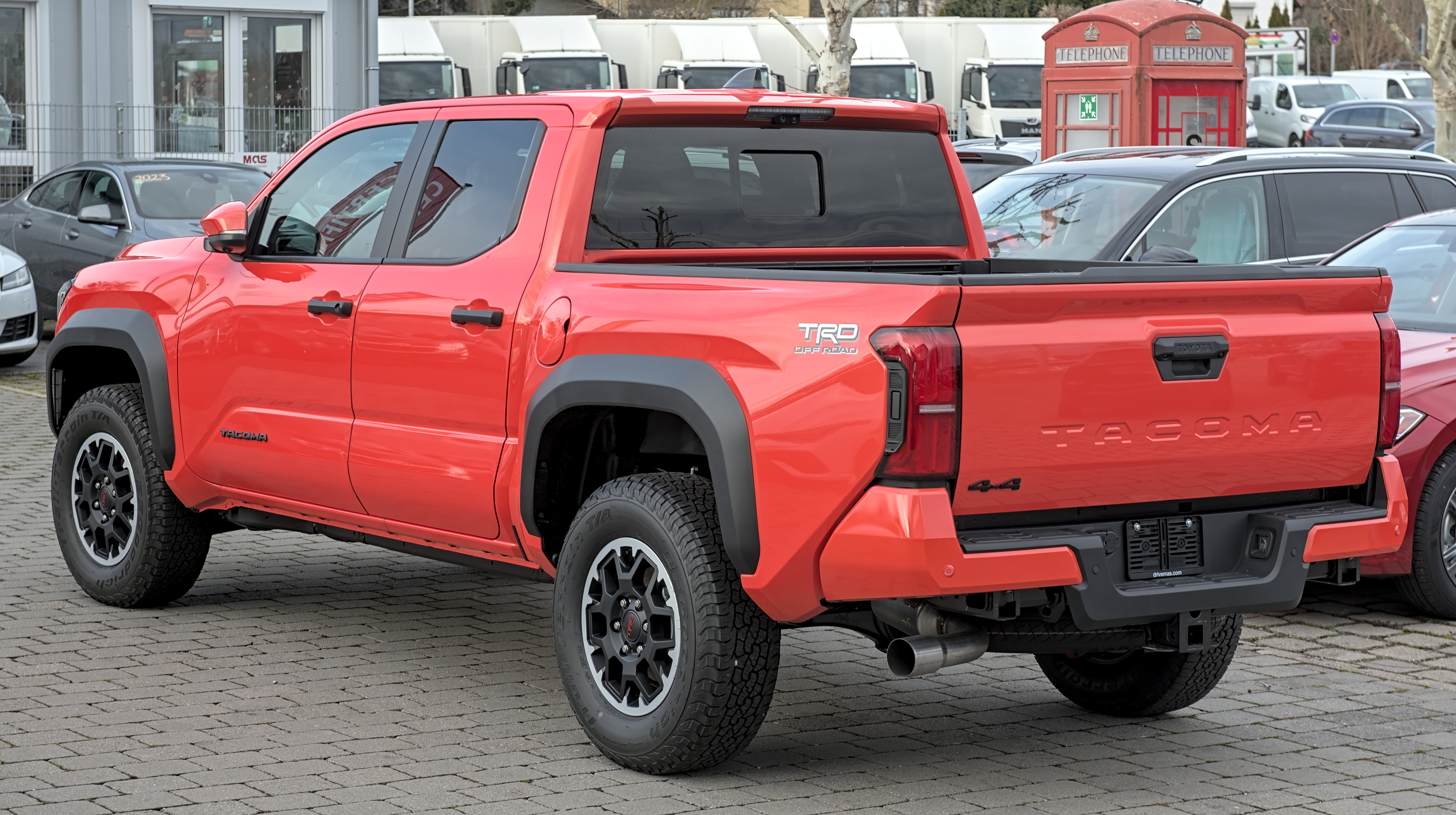
Rear view

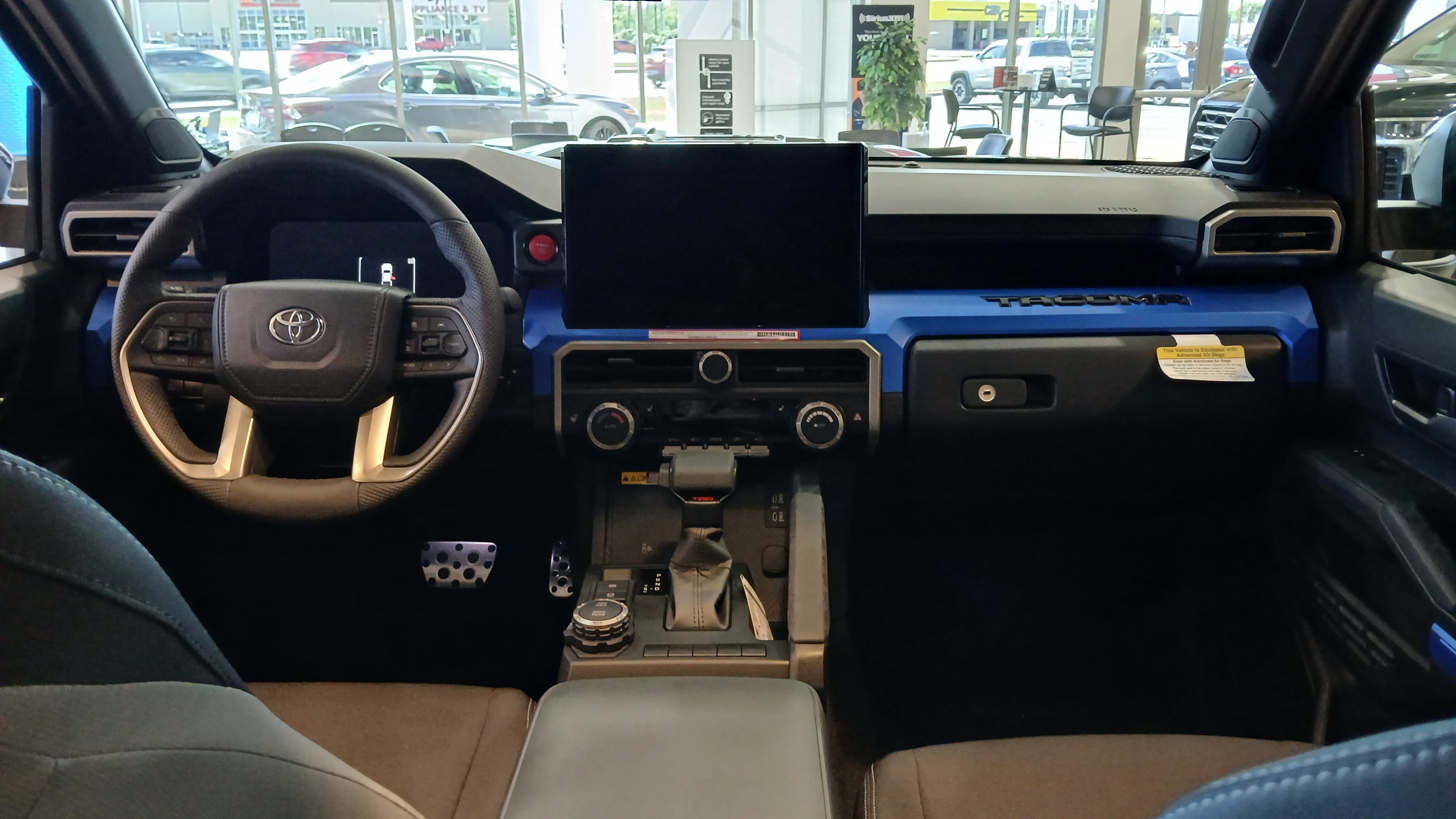
Interior

=== Trims ===
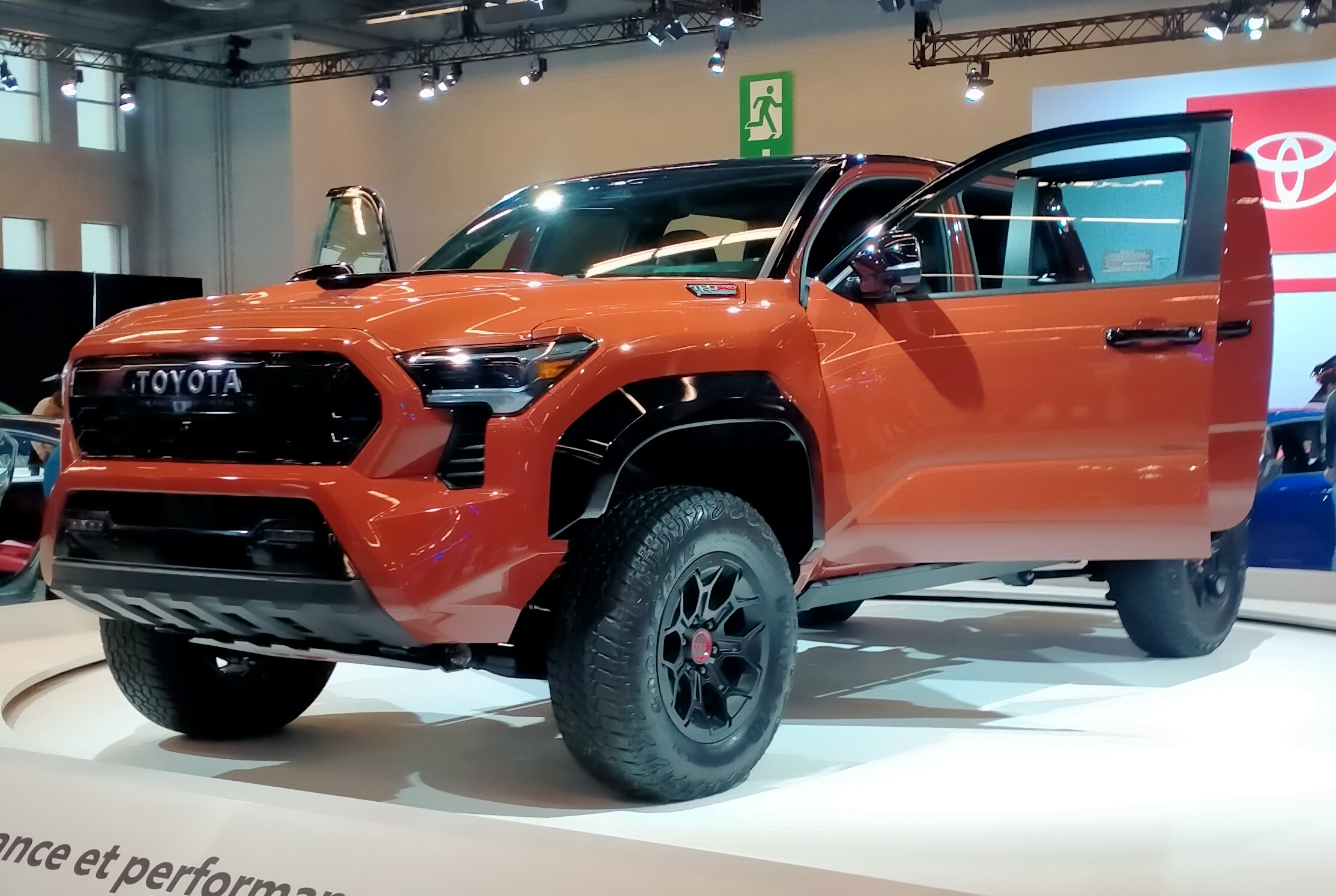
2024 Tacoma TRD Pro (Canada)

The fourth-generation Tacoma is available in eight trim levels, six of which are carried over from the previous generation: SR, SR5, Limited, TRD Sport, TRD Off-Road, and TRD Pro, along with a newly added Trailhunter with overlanding-specific equipment and the return of the TRD PreRunner, an off-road oriented two-wheel drive trim, last offered in the second-generation Tacoma. Toyota considers the TRD Pro and Trailhunter to be the halo model of the line.

The TRD Pro trim level includes IsoDynamic seats for the driver and front passenger which control motion through a series of four adjustable shock absorbers, Fox Factory racing shocks, and is 1 1/2–2 in (38–51 mm) taller and 3 in (76 mm) wider than the SR5.

The Trailhunter grade includes a suspension designed by ARB using Old Man Emu components. Externally, it can be distinguished by a standard snorkel engine air intake and bronze-colored accents.

The TRD PreRunner is available exclusively with the XtraCab body and rear-wheel-drive.

=== Chassis and body ===
The TNGA-F platform uses laser-welded high-strength steel frame members to increase rigidity, and aluminum body components to reduce weight. All Tacomas are equipped with four-wheel disc brakes, with an electronic parking brake and electric power steering.

Two cab configurations are available: an extended cab (marketed as "XtraCab," a brand used for the first-generation Tacoma and the earlier Toyota Pickup/Truck) and a crew cab (which Toyota brands as Double Cab). Most Tacomas will be built as a four-door Double Cab and will be available with a choice of a 5 ft (1.5 m) or 6 ft (1.8 m) bed, both with coil-sprung rear axles.

The XtraCab is a two-door, two-seat configuration. Unlike prior generations, the XtraCab will not be equipped with rear jump seats, instead having an interior lockable cargo storage area. Toyota removed the seats and rear-hinged half-doors for the 4th-generation after surveying customers and sales data, discovering 50% of the third-generation Access Cab truck buyers specified a rear seat delete (part of the utility package) and of the customers that had purchased the back seats, 30% had never used them and 39% used them less than once a month. By eliminating the doors, Toyota could avoid the significant expense of engineering the doors to pass side-impact crash testing. The XtraCab body will only be available with the SR, SR5, and TRD PreRunner trim levels and will only use the longer 6 ft (1.8 m) bed with a leaf-sprung rear axle.

=== Drivetrain ===
The fourth-generation Tacoma is built around the 2.4-liter T24A-FTS turbocharged inline-four engine producing 228–278 horsepower (170–207 kW) and 243–317 pound-feet (329–430 N⋅m) of torque, depending on trim and transmission, or a parallel hybrid version marketed as "i-Force Max", producing a total of 326 hp (243 kW) and 465 lb⋅ft (630 N⋅m) of torque. Most engines will be mated to an eight-speed electronically controlled automatic transmission, however a six-speed manual transmission with automatic rev matching and anti-stall technology will be available on some trims.

The i-Force Max hybrid engine in the Tacoma differs from the Hybrid Max powertrain in the 2023 Crown and 2024 Grand Highlander, which uses the same T24A-FTS engine. Unlike the aforementioned models, the Tacoma has a longitudinal engine, including the i-Force Max hybrid engine. i-Force Max has a single electric traction assist motor/generator between the engine and transmission, but otherwise shares the same basic transfer case and mechanical driveshaft running gear with non-hybrid Tacomas.

The fourth-generation Tacoma has a towing capacity up to 6,500 lb (2,900 kg).

4th Generation Tacoma engines and transmissions
Engine (Trans) Trim	Base (8sp. auto)	i-Force		i-Force Max (8sp. auto hybrid)
Engine (Trans) Trim	Base (8sp. auto)	(6sp. man)	(8sp. auto)	i-Force Max (8sp. auto hybrid)
SR	Yes	Opt. (Note: Double Cab only)	No	No
SR5	No	No	Yes	No
TRD PreRunner	No	No	Yes	No
TRD Sport	No	Opt.	Yes	Opt.
TRD Off-Road	No	Opt.	Yes	Opt.
Limited	No	No	Yes	Opt.
Trailhunter	No	No		Yes
TRD Pro	No	No		Yes
Type	2.4 L turbo I4			
Power	228 hp (170 kW)	270 hp (201 kW)	278 hp (207 kW)	326 hp (243 kW)
Power	228 hp (170 kW)	270 hp (201 kW)	278 hp (207 kW)	[48 hp (36 kW) electric]
Torque	243 lb⋅ft (329 N⋅m)	310 lb⋅ft (420 N⋅m)	317 lb⋅ft (430 N⋅m)	465 lb⋅ft (630 N⋅m)
Torque	243 lb⋅ft (329 N⋅m)	310 lb⋅ft (420 N⋅m)	317 lb⋅ft (430 N⋅m)	[184 lb⋅ft (249 N⋅m) electric]

Notes

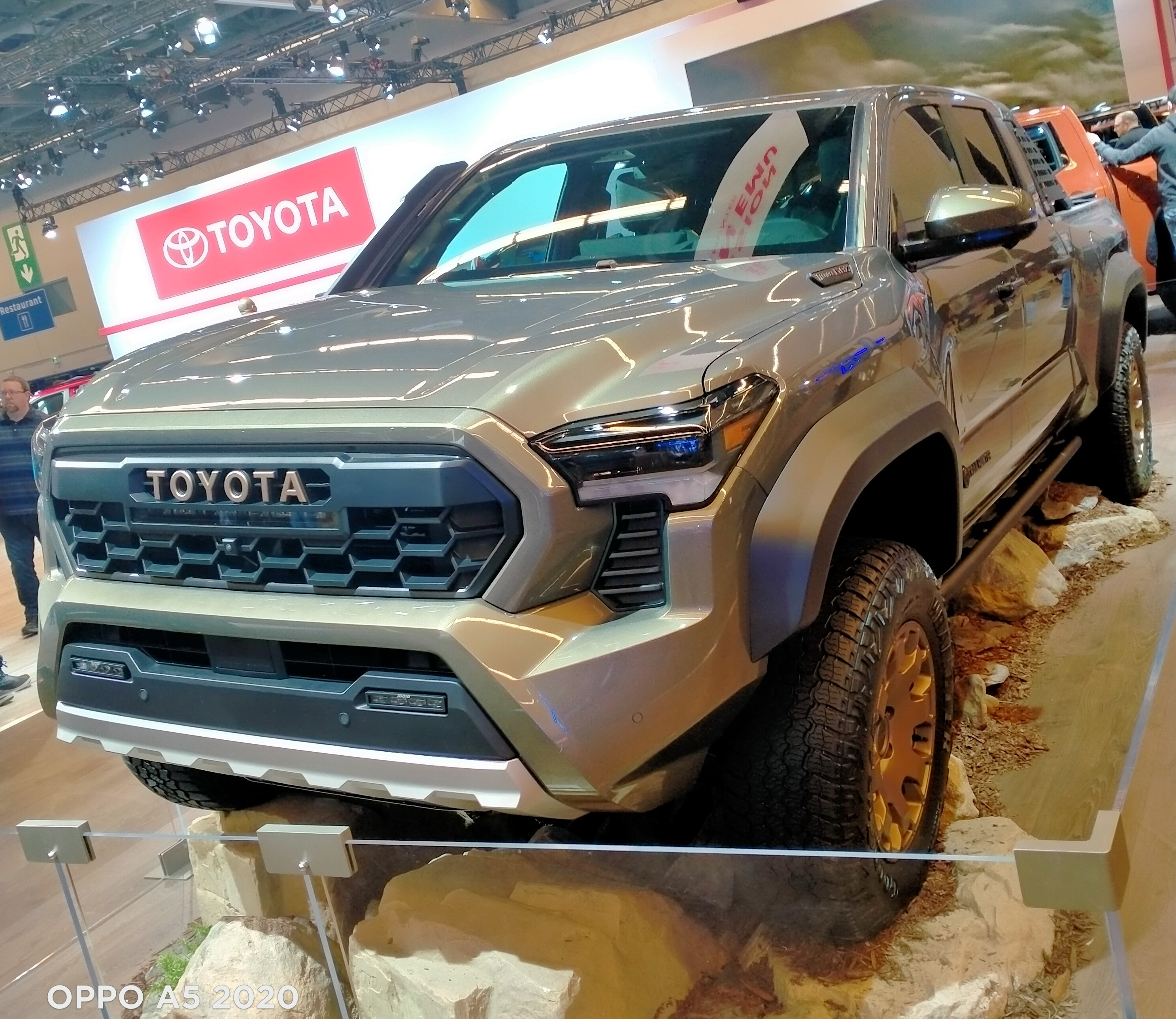
2024 Tacoma Trailhunter (Canada)

All Tacomas are equipped with an automatic limited-slip differential for the rear axle. Four-wheel-drive models have a two-speed (high and low range), electronically controlled transfer case; TRD (PreRunner, Off-Road, and Pro) and Trailhunter trims upgrade the rear differential to an electronically-locking version, and the Limited trim includes full-time all-wheel-drive with a center locking differential when equipped with the optional i-Force Max hybrid engine.

=== 2024 X-Runner Concept ===
Toyota revived the X-Runner name and applied it to a concept version of the 2024 Tacoma, debuting it at the 2023 SEMA Show. It is fitted with a modified version of the i-Force Max V6 engine utilized by the larger Tundra and Sequoia, as well as the Tundra's air suspension that allows the Tacoma X-Runner to sit at a much lower height. It is also fitted with the Tundra's 10-Speed Automatic transmission. The engine in the X-Runner Concept puts out 421 horsepower, a significant increase over the already powerful four-cylinder hybrid engine the production Tacoma gets, which itself puts out a generous 326 horsepower. The exhaust pipes have been rerouted to the sides of the truck, right below the rocker panels. The frame was strengthened and the track was widened by 3-inches, giving the truck a bolder stance. The X-Runner Concept is fitted with a custom body kit and is painted in Speedway Blue, the same color used on the original X-Runner that appeared at the Chicago Auto Show in 2004, while the roof, mirrors, and most of the hood are painted black, with a red accent trim on the hood. The Toyota logo on the front is in red lettering. Inside the X-Runner, the seats, door trim, and glove box door are done up in red upholstery, while the rest of the interior is black. The X-Runner logo is also stitched into the headrests.

=== Updates ===
In 2024, for 2025 model year, a new "Mudbath" color was available only for the TRD Pro trim.

=== Safety ===
The 2024 model year Tacoma crew-cab configuration was awarded "Top Safety Pick" by IIHS, but it did not receive the highest award as it has yet to be evaluated in the updated moderate overlap front test.

IIHS scores (2024)
Small overlap front	Good
Moderate overlap front (original test)	Good
Side (updated test)	Good
Headlights (varies by trim/option)	Acceptable
Front crash prevention: vehicle-to-pedestrian	Good
Seatbelt reminders	Good
Child seat anchors (LATCH) ease of use	Acceptable

== Toyota Racing Development ==
In 1998, Toyota added a new Toyota Racing Development (TRD) off-road package. The package includes off-road tires, 16-inch alloy wheels, TRD dampers, a locking rear differential and the TRD graphics.

In 2001, Toyota introduced a TRD sport package on the Tundra full-size pickup. This package was introduced in 2005 for the Tacoma at the same time as the release of the newly redesigned Tacoma.

=== TRD supercharger ===
Toyota Racing Development offered a TRD supercharger for the FJ Cruiser and Tacoma equipped with 4.0-liter V6 engine, available through Toyota dealerships. This supercharger was co-developed with Magnuson Superchargers. When installed by a professional dealer, it would not void any warranties on a vehicle. The supercharger increases the Tacoma's power output to 304 hp (227 kW) from the original 236 hp (176 kW), and the torque output to 334 lb⋅ft (453 N⋅m) and is now out of production.

The TRD supercharger is compatible on all 2005 through 2015 model year Tacoma trucks, and 2007 through 2009 model year FJ Cruiser SUV. This supercharger system features Eaton roots-type rotating components in a one-piece integral manifold, iridium spark plugs, and a five-rib serpentine drive belt system. It produces about 6 psi (0.41 atm; 41,000 Pa) of boost pressure.

The supercharger, when installed by an authorized Scion or Toyota dealer, has the same warranty as powertrain, five years or 60,000 miles (97,000 km), or the balance of the new car warranty, whichever is greater. When not installed by an authorized dealer, the supercharger is covered by a 12-month, 12,000-mile (19,000 km) parts-only warranty. The manufacturer's suggested retail price of the TRD supercharger is $4500, not including installation.

The TRD supercharger program was discontinued for all vehicles, including Tacoma, as of June 2015 due to the expense of development.

=== Back to the Future Tacoma Concept ===
On October 21, 2015, Toyota and Universal Pictures celebrated the 30th anniversary of Back to the Future (BTTF) with a Tacoma Concept that was inspired by the original Toyota Truck that Toyota created for the original film. In the film, the protagonist (Marty McFly) is gifted a black Toyota (Hilux) Pickup SR5 XtraCab 4×4 when he returns to 1985. The Hilux has been modified with extra lights, tubular bumpers, and aftermarket wheels and tires; the popularity of the film has led to numerous recreations of the original concept. The original concept from 1985 was destroyed in a crash, and the studio recreated it for the sequels; after filming was complete, most of the modifications were stripped and the truck was sold to a private owner.

For the 30th anniversary concept, a 2016 Tacoma 4WD was modified to resemble the 1985 original, using the same features and black color paint trim, KC HiLite driving lamps (modified with LED lighting), modified headlights and taillights (matching the 1985 version), the Toyota badging to the truck's tailgate, D-4S fuel injection, and the 1985-inspired mudflaps. The only difference between the 1985 original and the 2016 concept is the tires: Goodyear was featured in the 1985 film, while BF Goodrich is used on the concept. The concept also did not have a solid front axle like the original 1985 Pickup. Toyota notes that this is a one-off concept as there are no plans to offer it as a package or level trim. The 2016 Tacoma BTTF concept is featured in the launch campaign for the Mirai hydrogen fuel cell vehicle, which includes some of the original actors from the film. The concept was developed by Toyota's marketing arm, with assistance from KMA Promotion.

== Sales ==
Calendar year	US	Canada	Mexico
2000	147,295		
2001	161,983		
2002	151,960		
2003	154,154		
2004	152,932		
2005	168,831	2,900	381
2006	178,351	9,345	5,275
2007	173,238	9,477	4,886
2008	144,655	9,673	4,154
2009	111,824	9,082	4,129
2010	106,198	8,111	3,432
2011	110,705	7,711	3,771
2012	141,365	9,904	5,072
2013	159,485	10,400	3,394
2014	155,041	9,973	5,259
2015	179,562	11,772	5,194
2016	191,631	12,618	4,376
2017	198,124	12,454	3,647
2018	245,659	13,878	4,644
2019	248,810	12,536	5,476
2020	238,806	16,946	4,784
2021	252,490	14,879	3,831
2022	237,323	7,529	4,420
2023	234,768	16,433	3,624
2024	192,813		
2025	274,638		

== Use by the military ==
Many Tacoma vehicles were used by the US armed forces during the Iraq War and Operation Enduring Freedom. Typically, these were double-cab versions with SR5 or TRD trim. Although the Hilux, on which the Tacoma is based, is very common in the Middle East, the US military purchased Tacomas from American dealers, modified them accordingly, and sent them to Iraq. The Tacoma and Hilux share the same body, but the Tacoma's suspension differs significantly from the Hilux and is considered much weaker. Its gasoline engine runs much more smoothly than the diesel engine of the HMMWV (Hummer). The standard radio and almost all exterior lighting were removed from these acquired civilian vehicles. Instead, the vehicles were equipped with infrared spotlights so they could be used with night vision devices. Engines remained unchanged, but the vehicles were fitted with mud flaps, winches, and roll bars for machine guns.

== Motorsport ==
At CORR, Toyota provided a vehicle for the Pro Lite class called the “Toyota Tacoma.” In 1998, the team of Johnny Greaves and Jeff Kincaid won 19 out of 20 races and became the overall champion.

In 1998, in the Pikes Peak Hill Climb Unlimited class, a vehicle designed for Rod Millen and named “Toyota Tacoma” won the overall championship.

== See also ==
- List of Toyota vehicles
