= Toyota Highlander =

Mid-size crossover SUV

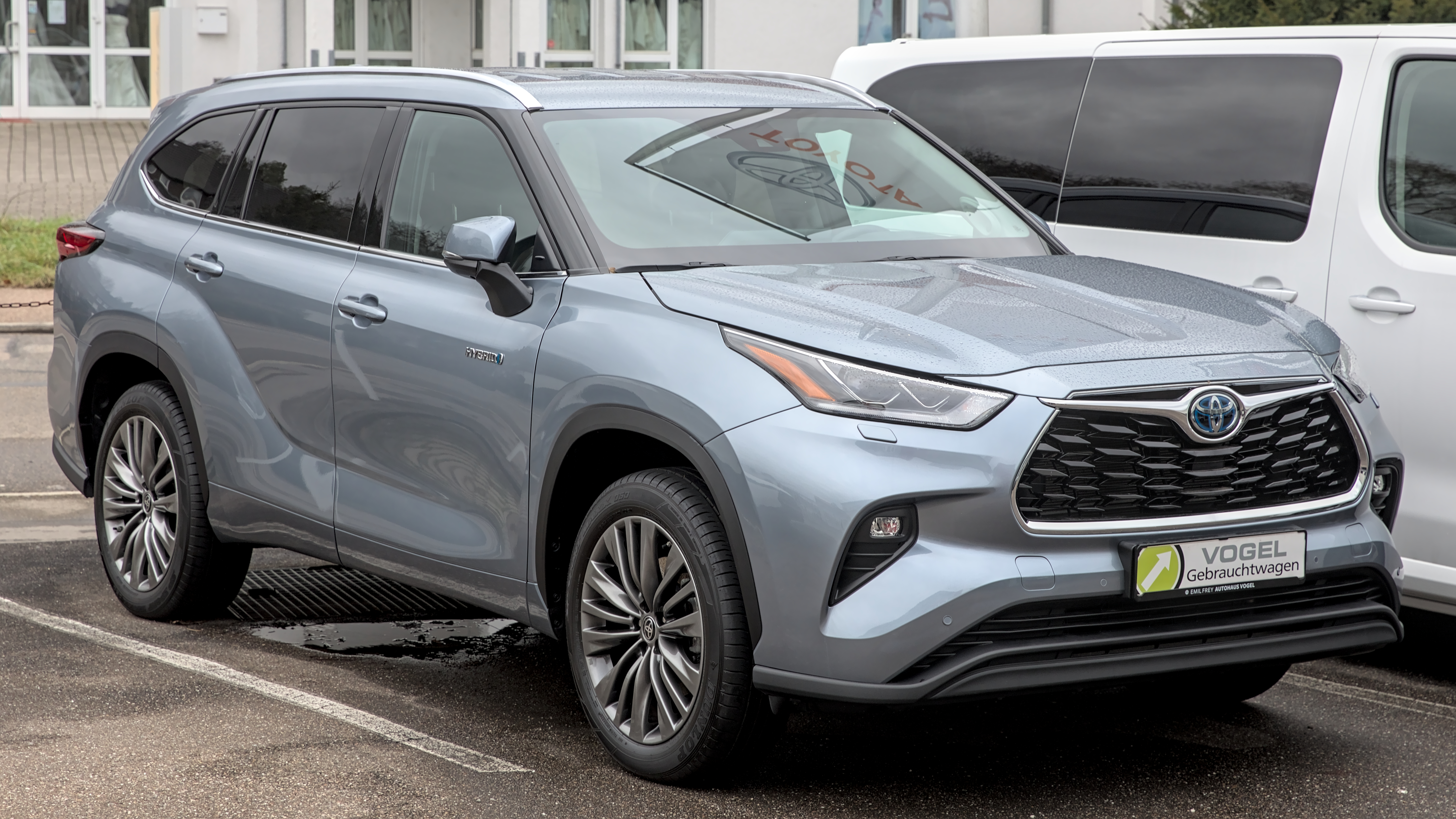
- 2022 Toyota Highlander Hybrid (XU70, Germany)

Overview
- Manufacturer: Toyota
- Also called: Toyota Kluger (Japan, 2000–2007; Australia, 2000–present); Toyota Crown Kluger (China, 2021–present); Subaru Getaway (North America, 2026–present)
- Production: 2000–present
- Model years: 2001–present

Body and chassis
- Class: Mid-size crossover SUV
- Body style: 5-door SUV
- Layout: Front-engine, front-wheel-drive; Front-engine, four-wheel-drive; Front-motor, front-wheel-drive (2026–present); Dual-motor, all-wheel-drive (2026–present)
- Chassis: Unibody

The Toyota Highlander (Japanese: トヨタ・ハイランダー, Hepburn: Toyota Hairandā), also known as the Toyota Kluger (Japanese: トヨタ・クルーガー, Hepburn: Toyota Kurūgā) in some markets, is a mid-size crossover SUV with three-row seating produced by Toyota since 2000.

The Highlander was announced in April 2000 at the New York International Auto Show, arriving in Japan in late 2000, and North America in January 2001. It was among the first of a new class of mid-size SUVs that were based on a car platform (later known as crossovers). At the time, the Highlander was built on the company's existing Toyota K architecture, shared with the Camry. The Highlander became Toyota's best-selling SUV in the US before being surpassed by the smaller RAV4 in 2006.

The first-generation model was sold in Japan as the Kluger, which was exclusive to a dealership network called Toyota Netz as a larger alternative to the RAV4. The Kluger nameplate is also used in Australia because "Highlander" is a trademarked trim line name owned by Hyundai. The name is derived from the German word klug, which means smart or clever (klüger – with diacritics – means "more clever“ in German).

The fifth-generation Highlander introduced in 2026 became a battery electric model. A Subaru version is marketed as the Subaru Getaway.

== First generation (XU20; 2000) ==
First generation
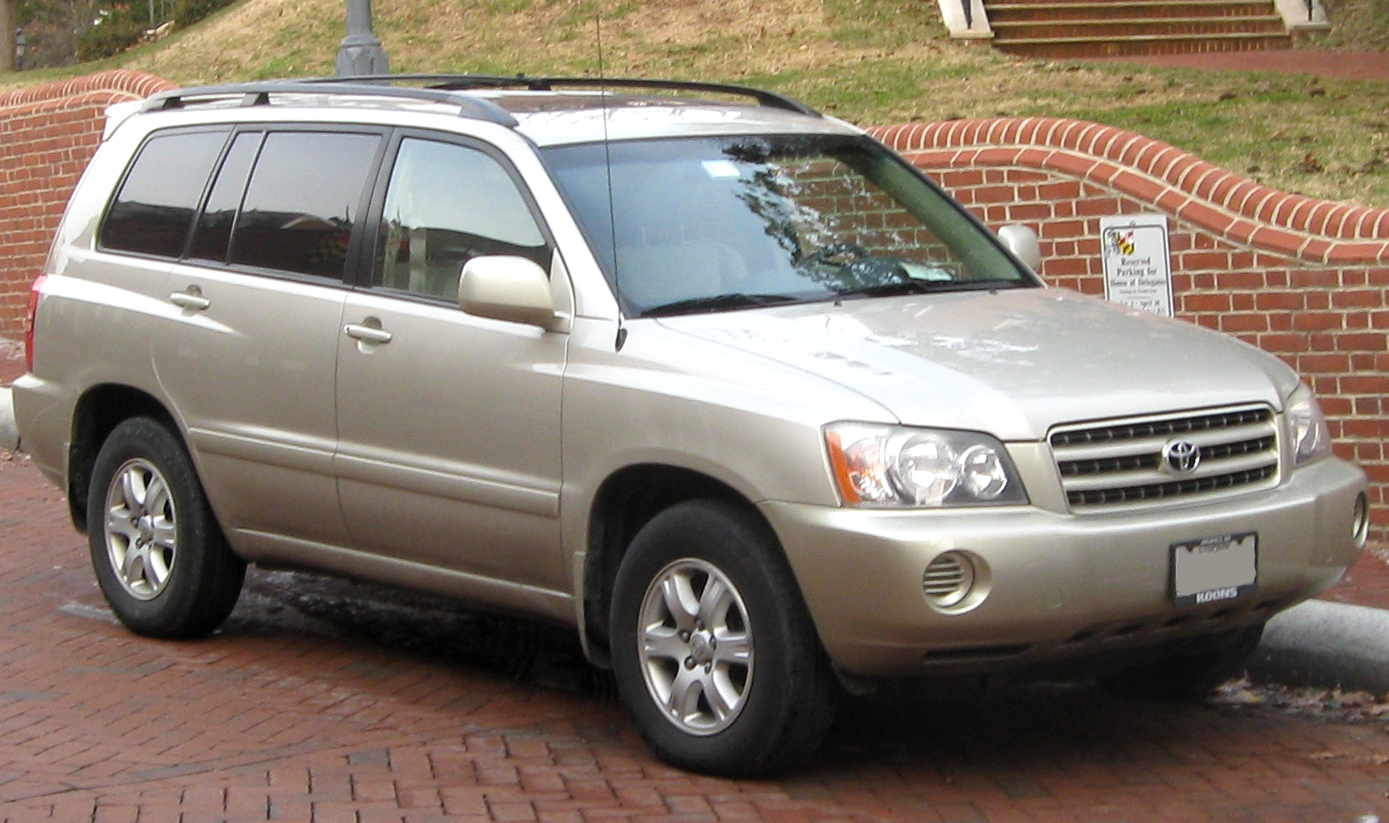
- 2001–2003 Toyota Highlander (MCU20)

Overview
- Model code: XU20
- Also called: Toyota Kluger (Japan and Australia)
- Production: November 2000 – May 2007
- Model years: 2001–2007
- Assembly: Japan: Miyawaka, Fukuoka (Toyota Motor Kyushu)

Body and chassis
- Platform: Toyota K platform
- Related: Lexus RX/Toyota Harrier (XU30); Toyota Sienna (XL20)

Powertrain
- Engine: Gasoline: 2.4 L 2AZ-FE I4; 3.0 L 1MZ-FE V6; 3.3 L 3MZ-FE V6
- Transmission: 4-speed U140E/140F/241E automatic (1MZ-FE/2AZ-FE); 5-speed U151E/F automatic (3MZ-FE); CVT (Hybrid)

Dimensions
- Wheelbase: 2,715 mm (106.9 in)
- Length: 4,681–4,714 mm (184.3–185.6 in)
- Width: 1,826 mm (71.9 in)
- Height: 1,679–1,750 mm (66.1–68.9 in)
- Curb weight: 1,716 kg (3,784 lb)

Chronology
- Successor: Toyota Vanguard (XA30) (for Kluger, Japan)

The Highlander (or Kluger in Japan and Australia) shared a platform with its XU30 series Lexus RX/Toyota Harrier cousin. It came in five (2001–2007) and seven-seat (2004–2007) configurations and became a sales success for Toyota in a number of markets across the world. The Highlander came standard with front-wheel drive and offered full time four-wheel drive. A rear limited-slip differential was optionally available on models without traction control. Unlike Toyota's own 4Runner and other mid-sized competitors such as the Jeep Grand Cherokee, or Chevrolet TrailBlazer, the Highlander aimed for on-road comfort with its unibody construction and independent rear suspension. Although it was longer than the 1996–2002 4Runner available at the time it was launched, the Highlander was surpassed in length by the redesigned 4Runner in August 2002.

The Highlander was available in three trim lines in the United States: the base model, the Sport model, and the Limited model. The base and Limited models were present when the Highlander was initially introduced, while the Sport model was introduced in March 2006. For the 2004 model year, the wheels on the Limited trim changed from a six-spoke to a five-spoke alloy. The base-model Highlander wheels also changed from steel-rims to the alloy wheels that were on the 2001–2003 model year Highlander Limited and B-Package. The Sport models had a distinctive grille design, differentiating themselves from the non-Sport models. Wheel styling also serves to differentiate the various models—the hybrid sports a unique twin-spoke design.

Engines:

- 2001–2007 2.4 L 2AZ-FE I4, 116 kW (155 hp; 157 PS) and 221 N⋅m (163 lb⋅ft)
- 2001–2003 3.0 L 1MZ-FE V6, 164 kW (220 hp; 223 PS) and 301 N⋅m (222 lb⋅ft).
- 2004–2007 3.3 L 3MZ-FE V6 (91 AKI octane), 172 kW (230 hp; 233 PS) and 328 N⋅m (242 lb⋅ft).
- 2006–2007 3.3L 3MZ-FE V6 (Hybrid),155 kW (208 hp; 211 PS) and 287 N⋅m (212 lb⋅ft).

For 2006-2007 Highlanders (gasoline), the 3MZ's power and torque ratings changed to 160 kW (215 hp; 218 PS) and 301 N⋅m (222 lb⋅ft) and 2AZ torque rating slightly drops to 220 N⋅m (162 lb⋅ft) due to new SAE J1349 testing standards adopted for MY2006 Toyota vehicles testing with 87 AKI octane fuel. Actual engine tuning does not change.

The 3.0-liter engine was able to propel the Highlander from 0–97 km/h (0–60 mph) in approximately 8.8 seconds. For 2004 the Highlander was given a new 3.3-liter V6 engine to compete with the more powerful V6 offerings from its competitors, mainly the Nissan Murano and the Honda Pilot. The larger engine made it possible for the Highlander to reach 0 to 97 km/h (0 to 60 mph) in 7.8 seconds.

Australia

The Kluger was introduced to Australia in October 2003. It was available in three guises: CV, CVX, and Grande. A limited edition CV Sport model was also released in 2006. There was no hybrid model available in Australia. The only engine offered was the 3.3-liter 3MZ-FE V6. Typical fuel economy using the Australian standard testing regime is 12.3 L/100 km (23.0 mpg_{‑imp}; 19.1 mpg_{‑US}).

=== 2001 update ===
For the 2001 model year, the Japanese and Australian Kluger was released with a center console integrated with the dashboard, while the North American Highlander initially lacked this integrated center console. This meant that the cup holders before 2002/2003/2004 were integrated to the seats. The integrated center console was introduced in all US Highlanders and in Canadian Limited Highlanders in late 2001, for the 2002 model year, and in all Canadian Highlanders in late 2003, for the 2004 model year. However, for early Highlanders without the integrated center console, a smaller non-integrated stand-alone center console was available as an option, either factory or dealer installed.

=== 2004 update ===
For the 2004 model year, an updated 3.3-liter engine was introduced alongside a new five-speed automatic transmission for the V6-powered models. The five-speed automatic replaced the four-speed automatic transmission paired with the outgoing 3.0-liter V6, while the inline-four models remain unchanged. This year also saw the introduction of the optional third row seat allowing for two additional passengers. A DVD-based navigation system was introduced to the Highlander for the 2006 model year as an option on the Hybrid Limited trim. The unibody was slightly modified behind the second row seats to include a depression in the hatch floor able to accommodate the optional third row seating. On models without third row seating, this space was turned into a storage compartment. (prior to 2004 the spare tire was accessible from inside the vehicle where the third row seating would subsequently be located; beginning in 2004 the spare tire is accessible from underneath the vehicle). Subtle changes to the front grille, front and rear bumpers, headlights and tail lights round-out the major changes for the 2004 refresh.

Pre-facelift

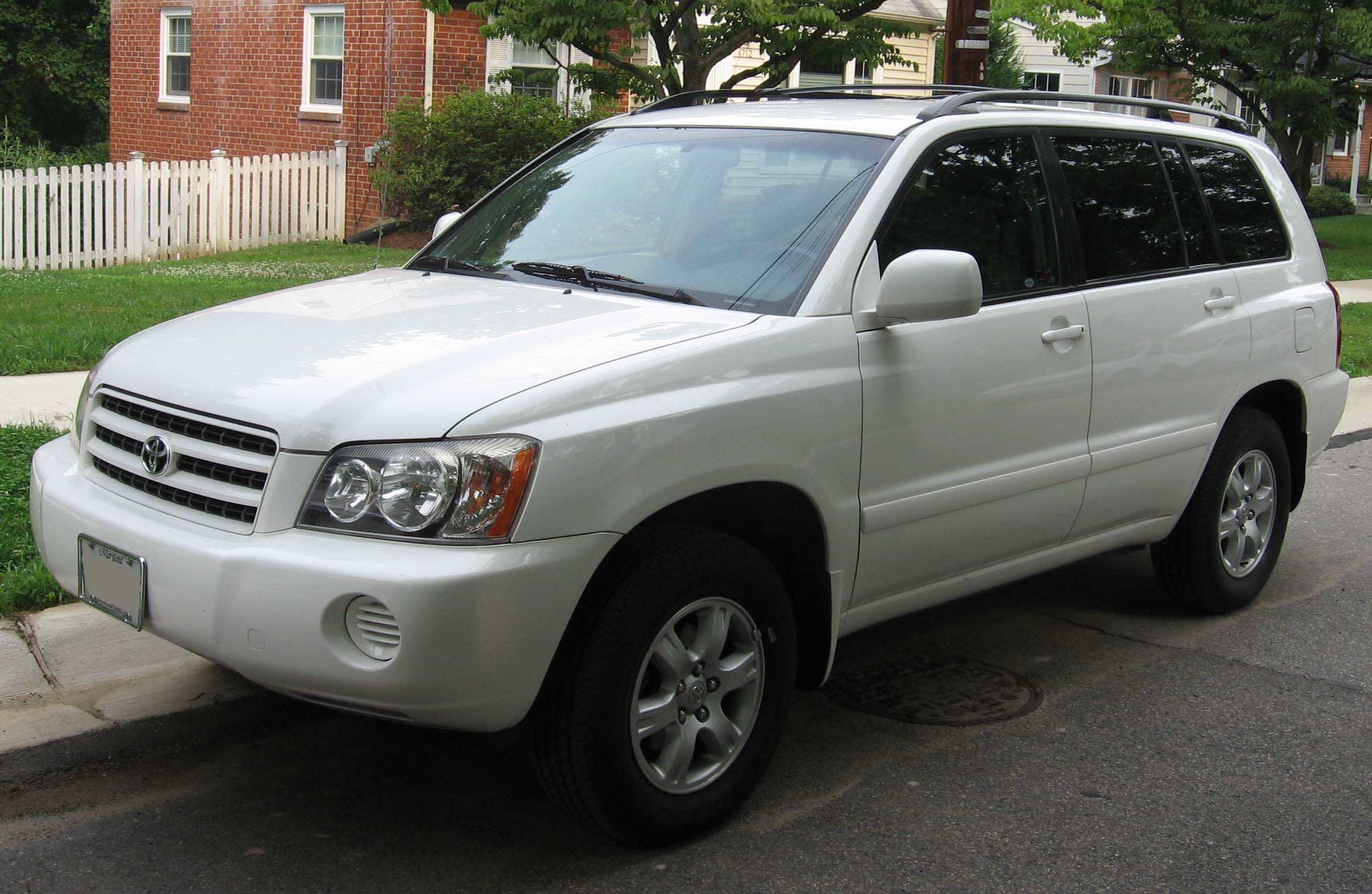

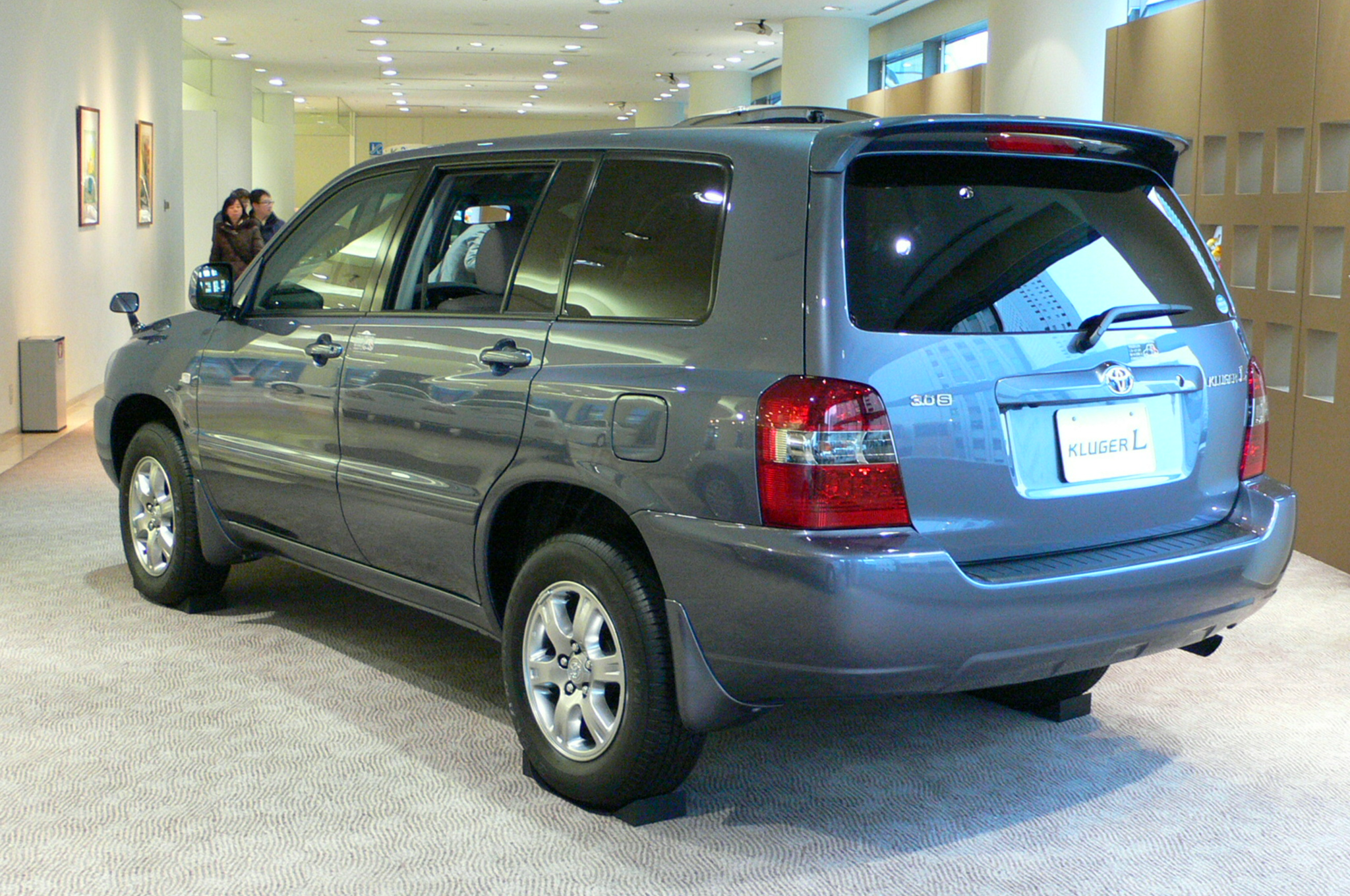
Post-facelift

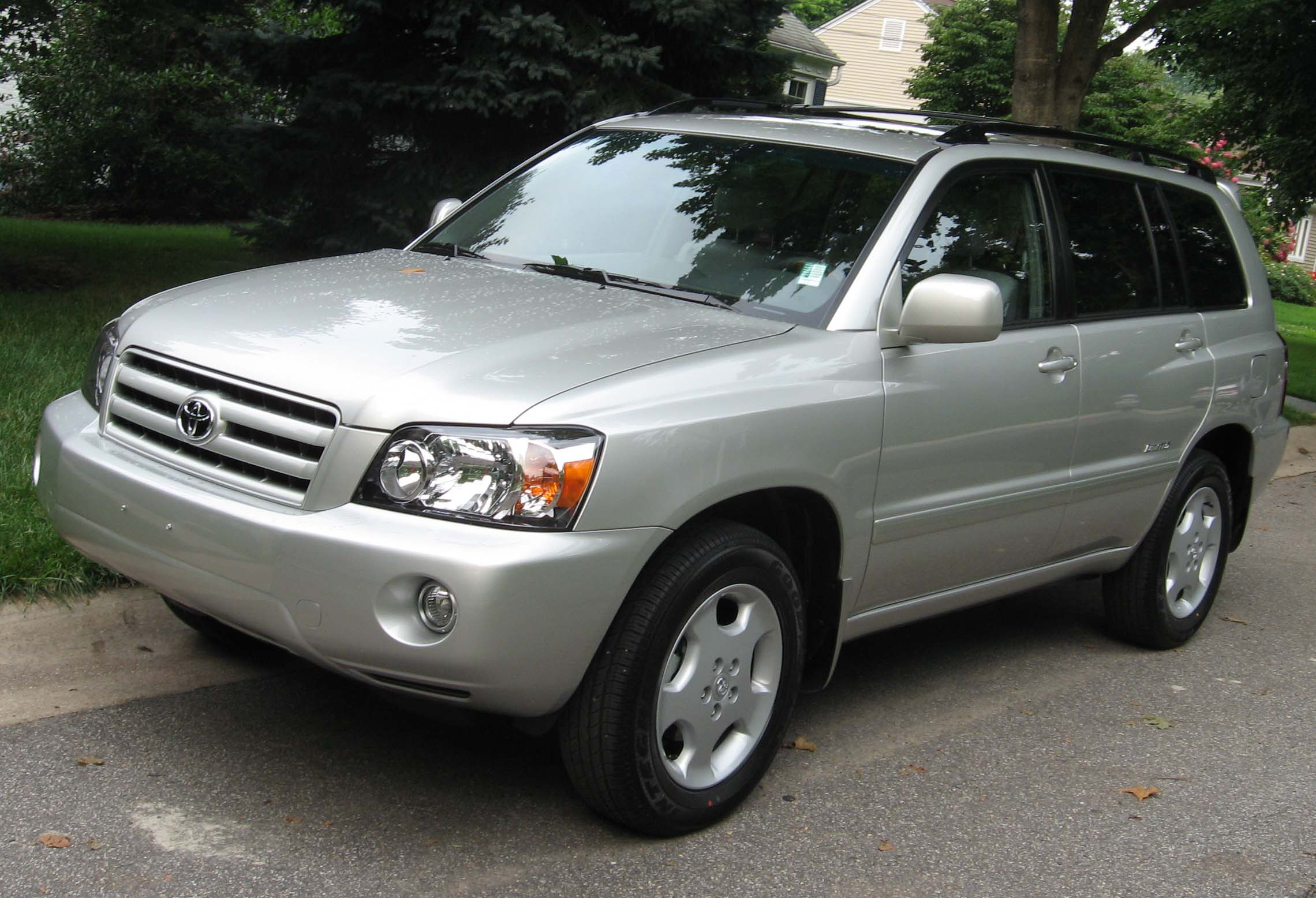

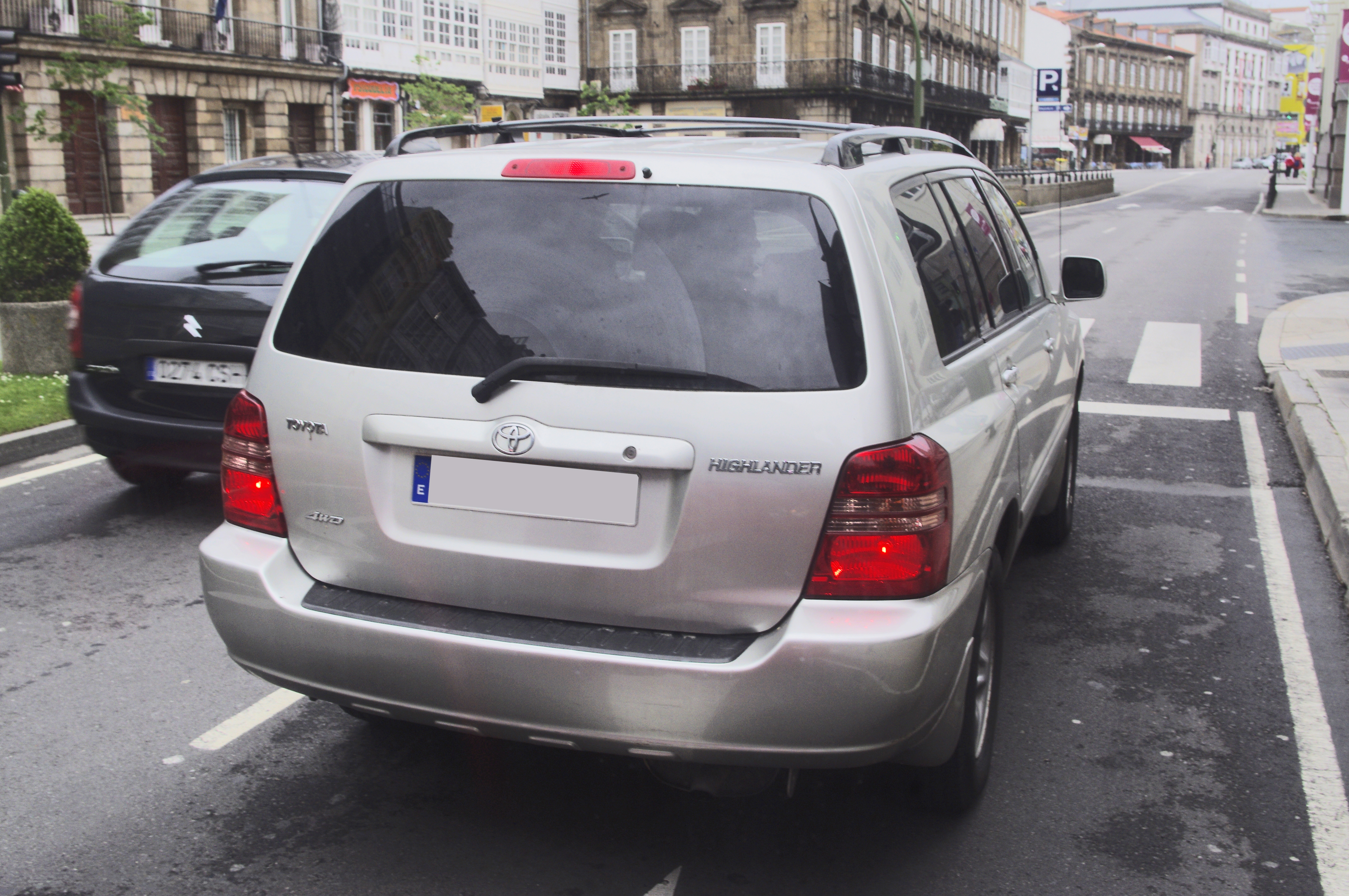

=== 2005 update ===
In 2005, for the 2006 model year, Highlanders sold in Canada were offered only in a V6 all-wheel drive configuration. Hybrid models were available with part-time four-wheel drive, which Toyota refers to as 4WD-i whereby the rear wheels are powered by a separate electric motor. This system is intended for use on snow and ice and is prone to overheating the rear electric motor off-road.

=== Safety ===
Anti-lock brakes, brake assist and electronic brakeforce distribution were standard, Vehicle Stability Control w/traction control optional on 2001–03 models became standard for 2004 models (Hybrids come standard with VDIM). Also standard for 2004 was a tire pressure monitor. Front seat-mounted side torso airbags were optional on 2001–06 models, while front and second row side curtain airbags were optional on 2004–06 models. Side airbags became standard on 2007 models and the curtain airbags gained a rollover sensor that year as well.

NHTSA crash test ratings, no side airbags (2002):
Frontal Driver:	4/5 stars
Frontal Passenger:	4/5 stars
Side Driver:	4/5 stars
Side Rear Passenger:	5/5 stars
Rollover:	3/5 stars

NHTSA crash test ratings, no side airbags (2004):
Frontal Driver:	5/5 stars
Frontal Passenger:	5/5 stars
Side Driver:	5/5 stars
Side Rear Passenger:	5/5 stars
Rollover (2005):	4/5 stars

In Insurance Institute for Highway Safety (IIHS) crash tests the Highlander was rated "Good" overall in the frontal offset crash test. The IIHS reported the Highlander had one of the lowest driver fatality rates among all vehicles, and amongst SUVs, only the Toyota 4Runner had a lower driver fatality rate. This report looked at 2001–2005 model year vehicles in the US.

ANCAP test results* Toyota Kluger / Highlander variants with dual frontal airbags (2003)
Test	Score
Overall	4 /5 stars
Frontal offset	10.43/16
Side impact	16/16
Pole	Not Assessed
Seat belt reminders	0/3
Whiplash protection	Not Assessed
Pedestrian protection	Not Assessed
Electronic stability control	Optional

ANCAP test results* Toyota Kluger / Highlander variants with side & curtain airbags (2003)
Test	Score
Overall	4 /5 stars
Frontal offset	10.43/16
Side impact	16/16
Pole	2/2
Seat belt reminders	0/3
Whiplash protection	Not Assessed
Pedestrian protection	Not Assessed
Electronic stability control	Optional

=== Hybrid (MHU28, 2005) ===
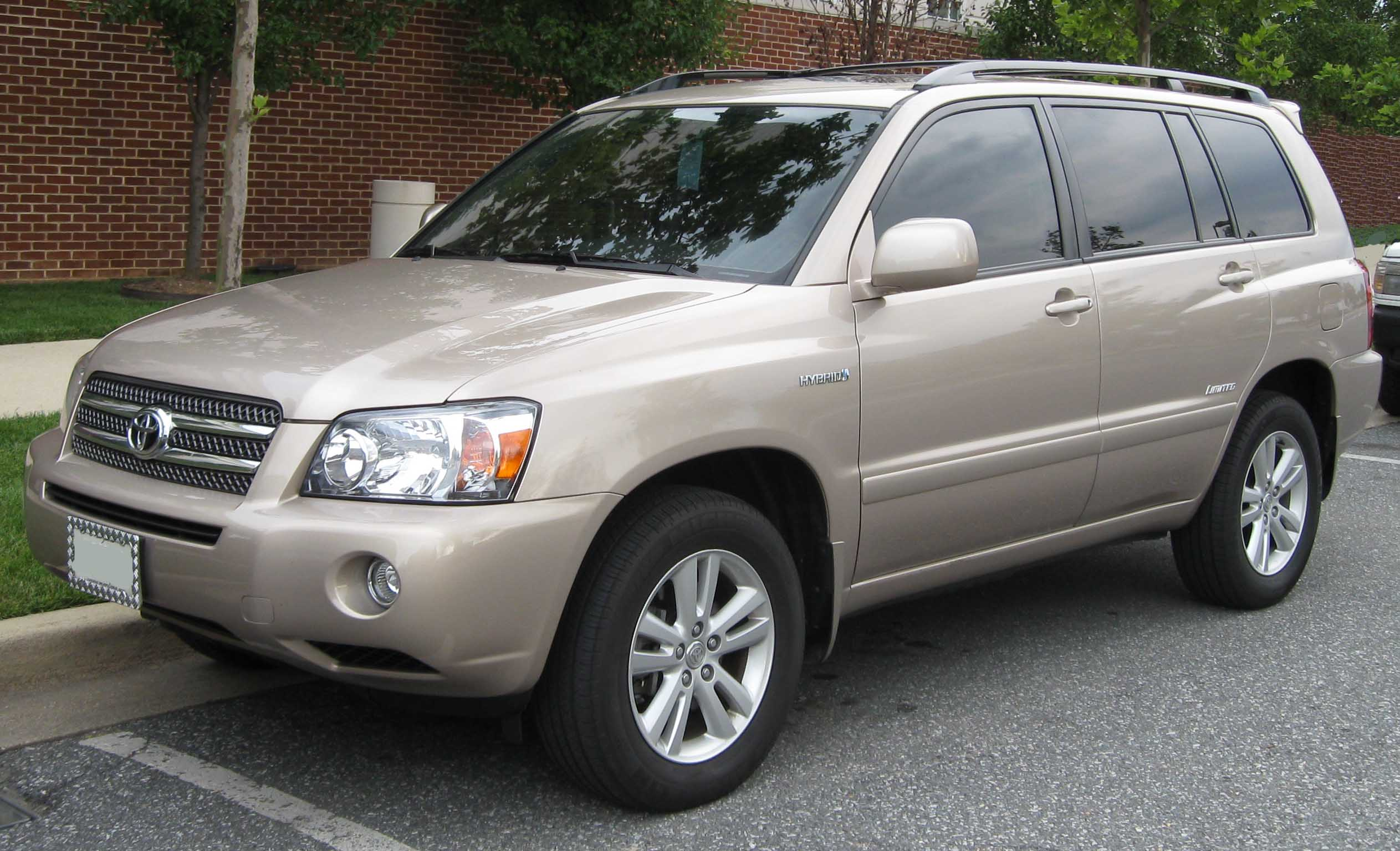
Highlander Hybrid Limited

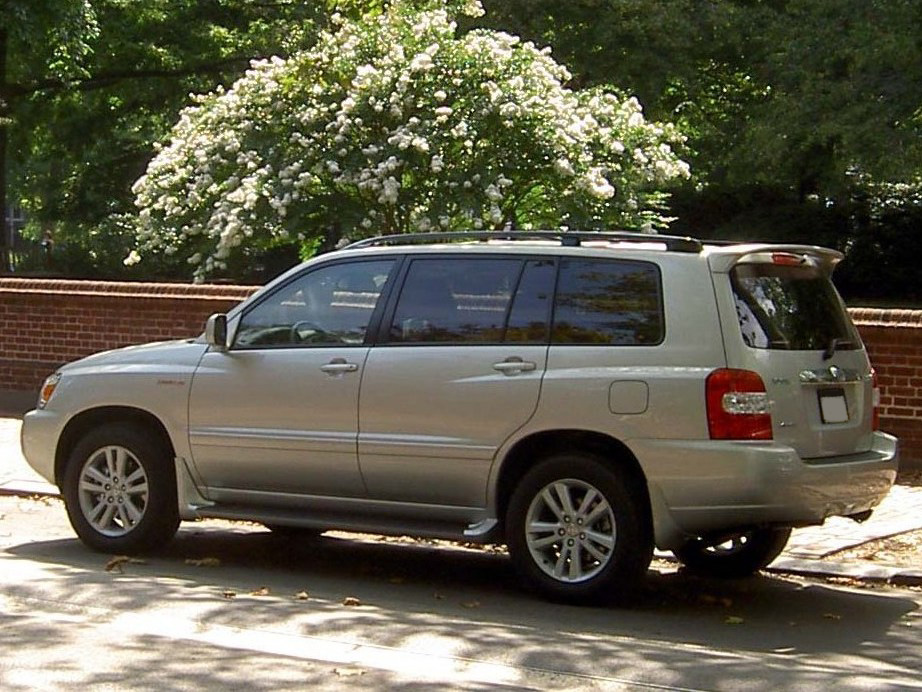
Highlander Hybrid

Initially, the Kluger was a regular, non-hybrid SUV driven by an internal combustion engine, but later Toyota introduced a hybrid version, the Kluger Hybrid that utilizes the company's Hybrid Synergy Drive technology combined with the company's 3MZ-FE 3.3-liter V6 engine offered in either FWD or AWD trim. The hybrid drivetrain was unveiled at the 2004 North American International Auto Show, and was offered to the public in July 2005 as a 2006 model. The power steering pump, water pump and AC compressor were changed from belt-drive to electrically powered versions. A modified alternator was incorporated into the hybrid system.

In North America, the hybrid version was called the Highlander Hybrid. It was also the first seven-seat hybrid vehicle from Toyota. With the electric motors providing power, overall acceleration improved, particularly at passing speeds. Other additions include Toyota's Vehicle Dynamics Integrated Management (VDIM) system and Electronically Controlled Brake (ECB). The California Air Resources Board gave it a SULEV emission rating. The US Environmental Protection Agency (revised standards) rated it at 8.4 L/100 km; 34 mpg_{‑imp} (28 mpg_{‑US}) City/9.4 L/100 km; 30 mpg_{‑imp} (25 mpg_{‑US}) Highway for FWD models and 8.7 L/100 km; 32 mpg_{‑imp} (27 mpg_{‑US})/9.4 L/100 km; 30 mpg_{‑imp} (25 mpg_{‑US}) for AWD models. This system is near identical to that of the Lexus RX 400h. All-wheel drive models were rated to tow 1,600 kg (3,500 lb).

== Second generation (XU40; 2007) ==
Second generation
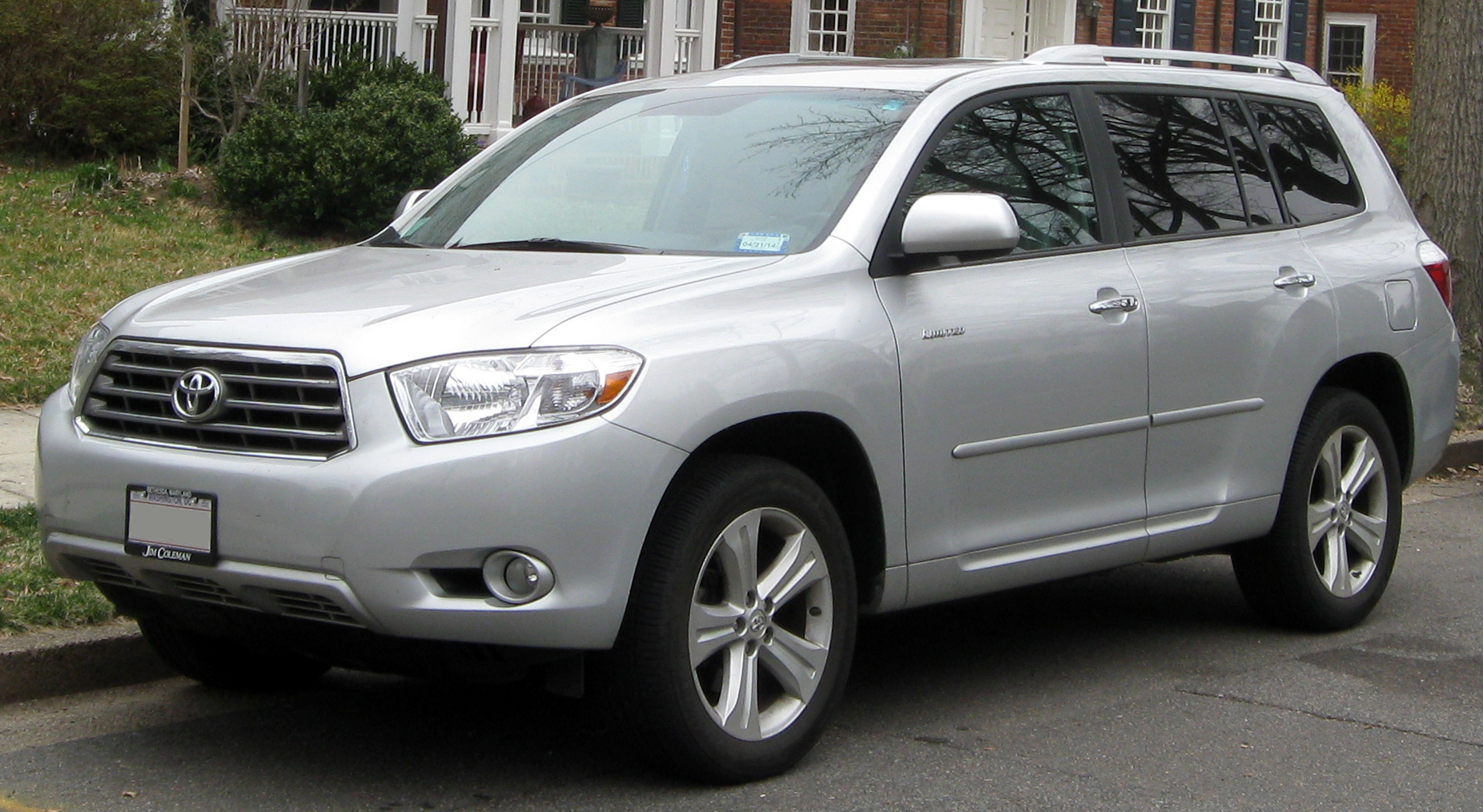
- 2008–2010 Toyota Highlander Limited (GSU40)

Overview
- Model code: XU40
- Also called: Toyota Kluger (Australia)
- Production: May 2007 – 2013; October 2007 – November 2013 (US)
- Model years: 2008–2013
- Assembly: Japan: Miyawaka, Fukuoka (Toyota Motor Kyushu); China: Guangzhou (GAC Toyota); United States: Princeton, Indiana (TMMI)
- Designer: Ian Cartabiano (2005); Matthew Sperling, Peter Kim and Chung Lee (2010 facelift)

Body and chassis
- Platform: Toyota K platform
- Related: Lexus RX (AL10); Toyota Sienna (XL30); Toyota Venza (AV10)

Powertrain
- Engine: Gasoline: 2.7 L 1AR-FE I4; 2.7 L 3AR-FE I4 (China); 3.5 L 2GR-FE V6; 3.3 L 3MZ-FE V6 (hybrid); 3.5 L 2GR-FXE V6 (hybrid)
- Transmission: 5-speed U151E automatic; 6-speed U760E automatic

Dimensions
- Wheelbase: 2,789 mm (109.8 in)
- Length: 4,785 mm (188.4 in)
- Width: 1,910–1,918 mm (75.2–75.5 in)
- Height: 1,730–1,760 mm (68.1–69.3 in)
- Curb weight: 1,835 kg (4,045 lb)

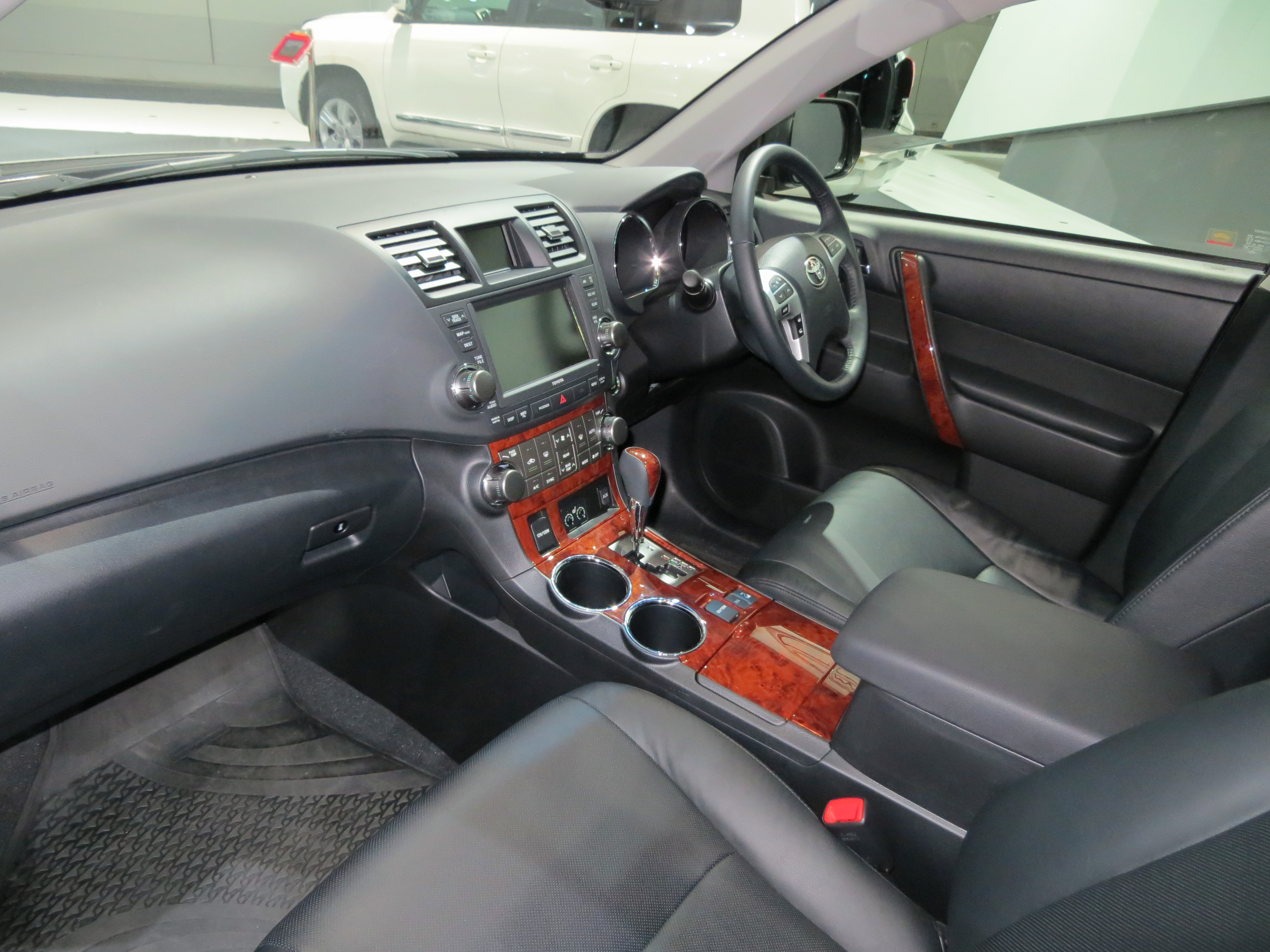
Interior

Toyota revealed the second generation Highlander and Highlander Hybrid at the 2007 Chicago Auto Show, with American sales beginning in July and hybrids in late September. The second generation Highlander and Highlander Hybrid were not sold in Japan. The five-seat Highlander for the United States and Canada was dropped as the Venza replaced it.

Initially the sole powertrain for the 2008 Highlander was a 201 kW (270 hp; 274 PS) 3.5-liter 2GR-FE V6 mated to a five-speed automatic. The four-cylinder model had been discontinued but added again in 2009. While the 3.5-liter engine has 41 kW (55 hp; 56 PS) more than the previous 3.3-liter V6 and dimensional increases along with increased sound proofing added nearly 225 kg (500 lb) to the vehicle's curb weight of approximately 1,815 kg (4,000 lb), fuel economy is slightly improved. The EPA estimated fuel economy for front-wheel drive models is at 13 L/100 km (18 mpg_{‑US}; 22 mpg_{‑imp}) city and 9.8 L/100 km (24 mpg_{‑US}; 29 mpg_{‑imp}) highway (previous generation was: 14 L/100 km (17 mpg_{‑US}; 20 mpg_{‑imp}) city and 10 L/100 km (23 mpg_{‑US}; 28 mpg_{‑imp}) hwy).

For 2009, Toyota again offered a 4-cylinder for 5-passenger front-wheel drive models with the all-new ULEV-II certified 2.7-liter 1AR-FE I4 paired to a six-speed automatic. It generates 139 kW (187 hp; 190 PS) at 5,800 rpm and 252 N⋅m (186 lb⋅ft) of peak torque at 4,100 rpm on regular 87 octane fuel. The four-cylinder delivers an EPA estimated fuel economy of 12 L/100 km (20 mpg_{‑US}; 24 mpg_{‑imp}) city and 8.7 L/100 km (27 mpg_{‑US}; 32 mpg_{‑imp}) highway. This is better than the previous model's four-cylinder with 12 L/100 km (19 mpg_{‑US}; 23 mpg_{‑imp})/9.4 L/100 km (25 mpg_{‑US}; 30 mpg_{‑imp}).

The same three trim levels were offered (Base, Sport and Limited) until early 2010 when the SE model replaced the Sport model, buyers are still able to choose between front-wheel drive or all-wheel drive on V6 platforms. Also new is an Electric Power Steering (EPS) system. Sport and Limited models get a standard backup camera which displays in the 7-inch Navigation System for models with Navigation or in the 3.5-inch LCD in the Multi-Information Display for models without Navigation. The LCD is optional on Base models; models without the LCD have a clock. Major options include leather seats, heated seats, a touchscreen DVD based navigation system, a new Smart Key System, an upgraded JBL Synthesis stereo, a rear-seat DVD entertainment system with 9-inch screen, and a towing package that increases towing capacity to 5000 pounds.

The XU40 was initially produced exclusively at Toyota Motor Kyushu's Miyata plant for all global markets beginning in May 2007. Production in China for local sales was started on 25 May 2009 by GAC Toyota in Nansha District, Guangzhou, Guangdong. Toyota had intended on building the Highlander in Blue Springs, Mississippi for the North American market in the 2011 model year. However, the Corolla was built there instead, and the Highlander is being built at Toyota Motor Manufacturing Indiana in Princeton, Indiana, from the 2010 model year onward for a majority of North America, replacing Tundra production. TMMI Highlander production began in October 2009 for gasoline engine models only; hybrids continued to be imported from Japan until the release of the third generation XU50, where all production except for China was consolidated at TMMI.

In Australia, the new generation Kluger was launched in August 2007. There are three trims available, KX-R, KX-S and Grande. All trims are available with either 2WD or AWD. The base model KX-R is also available with either five or seven seats, whilst the latter trims are seven seaters only. Specifications are mostly similar to the US Highlander, sharing the same 3.5-liter V6 2GR-FE engine and five-speed automatic transmission.

=== 2010 update ===
In 2010, for the 2011 model year, Toyota made some changes to the Highlander and Highlander Hybrid. While the general design remains similar to the 2008–2010 model, the Highlander's front end has been significantly revised, now featuring new headlights, a new black with chrome accent rocker panel, and new front grille. The non-hybrid engines for 2011 remain the same, although now the 2.7-liter four-cylinder engine may be had on the SE trim level, previously only available on the base model. More standard features are now equipped on all trim levels, with the base model receiving rear air conditioning, third row seating, cruise control, and a multi-function keyless entry control. The facelifted model was also sold in Russia from 2010 to 2013. The Base Plus trim level was added.

Pre-facelift

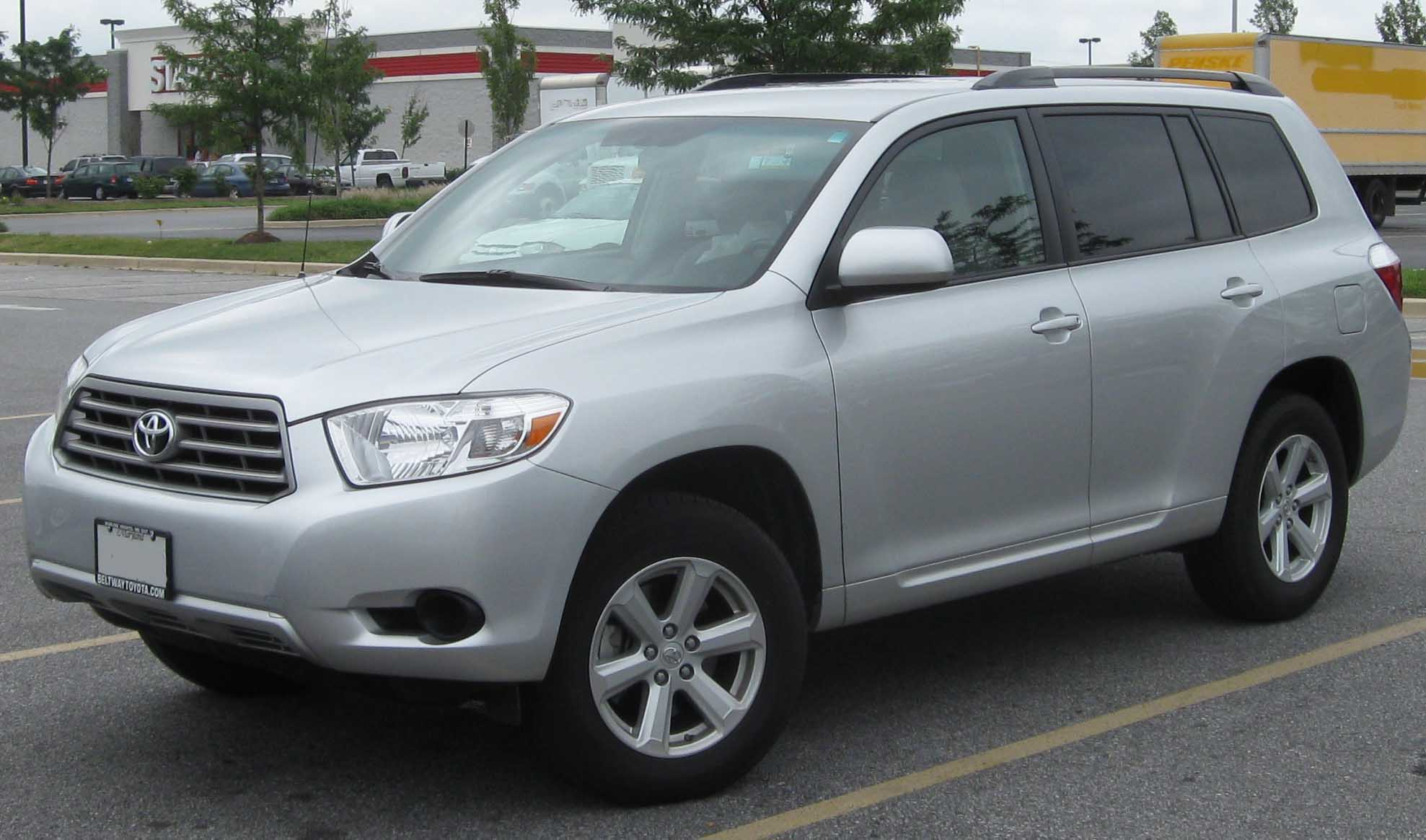
Front

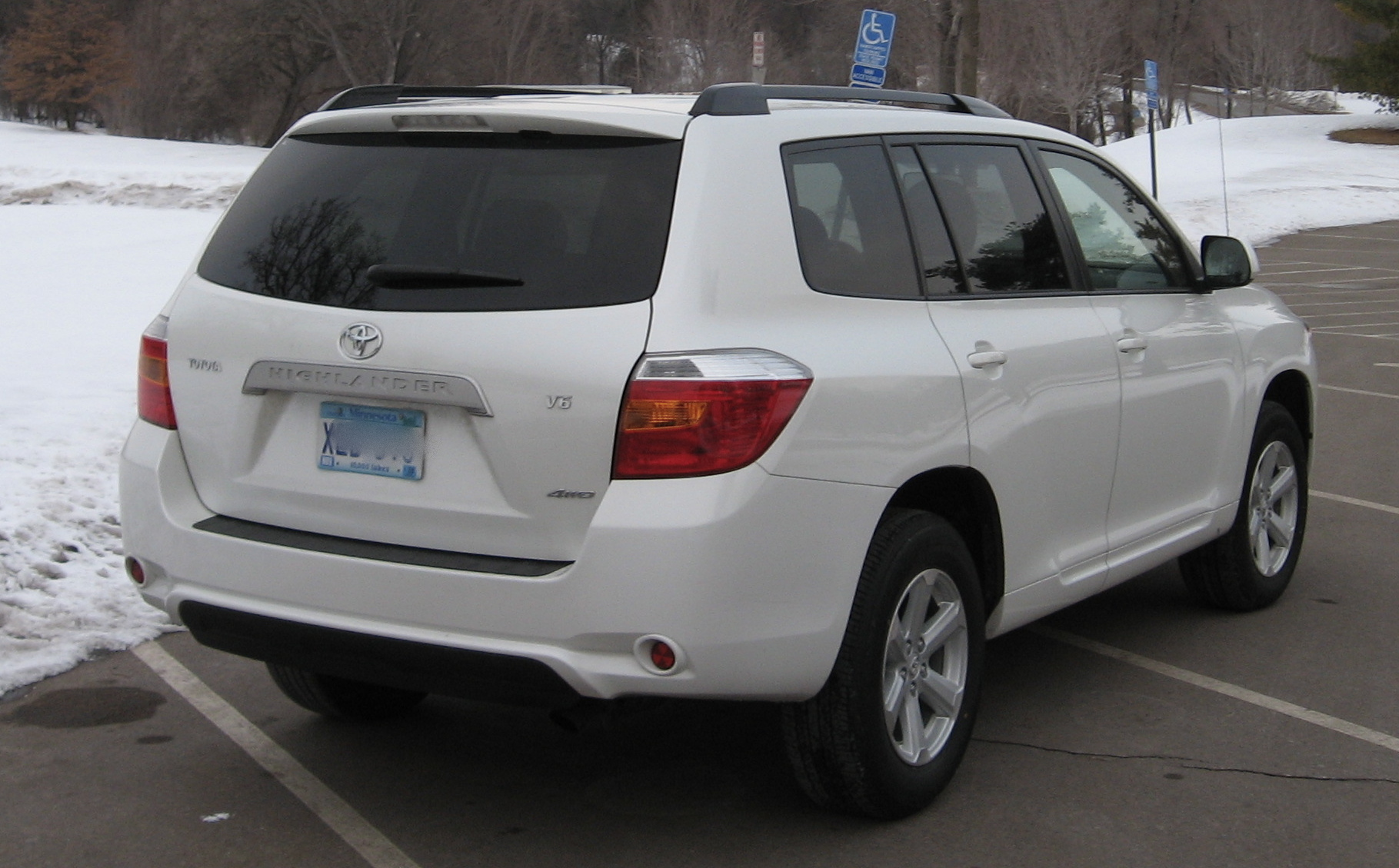
Rear
Post-facelift

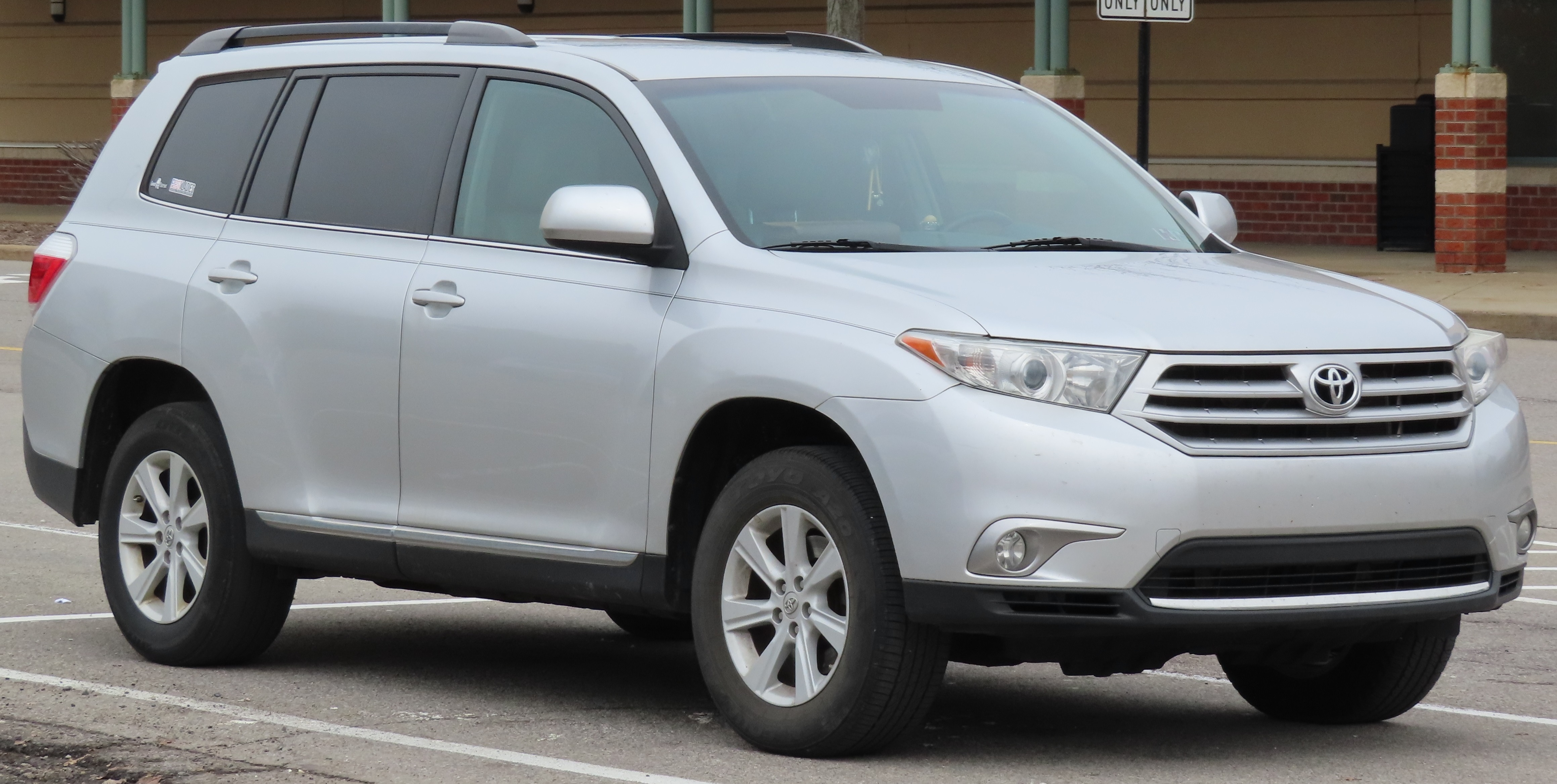
Front

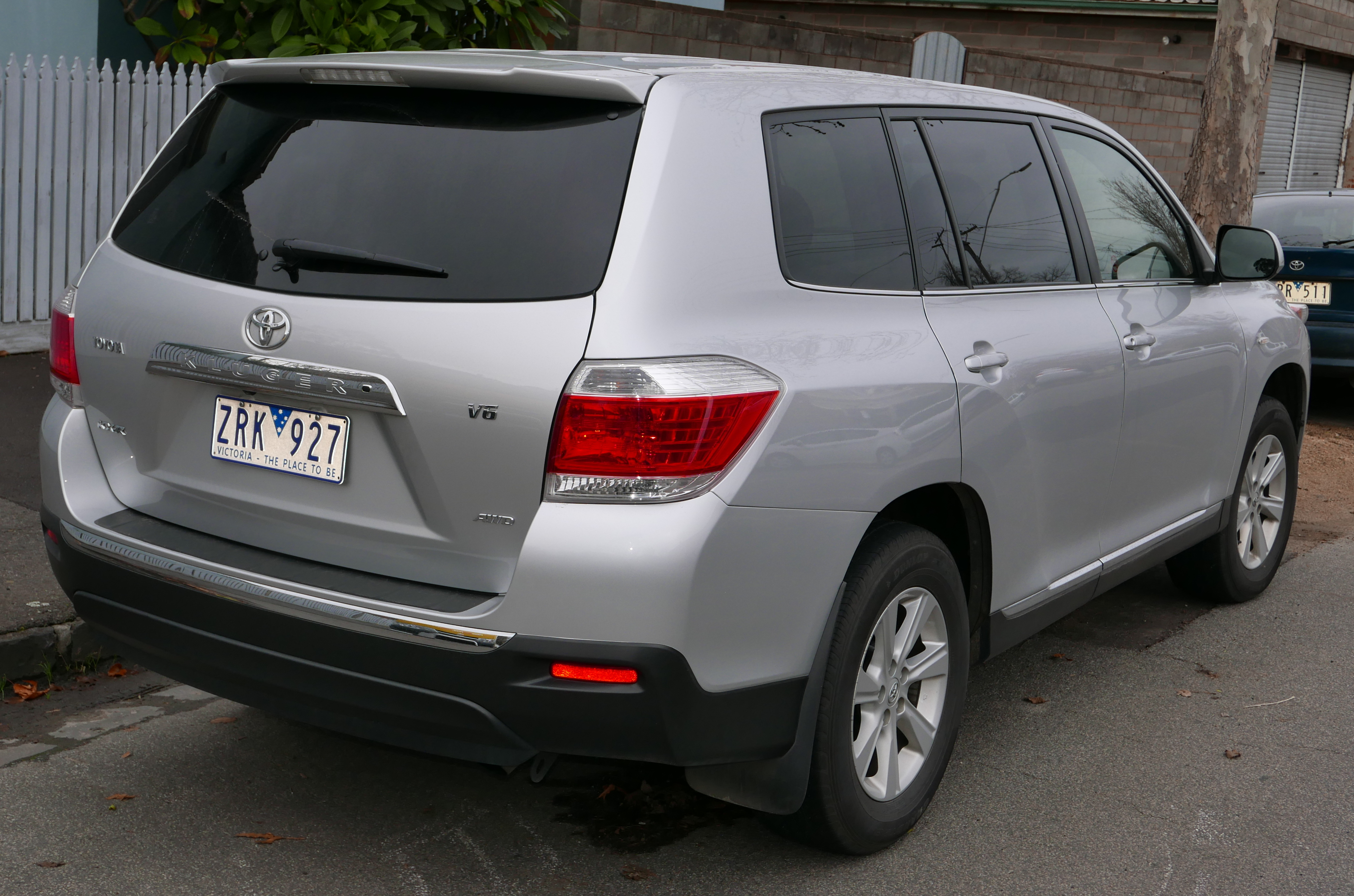
Rear (Kluger KX-R)

=== Safety ===
NHTSA crash test ratings (2008):
Frontal Driver:	5/5 stars
Frontal Passenger:	4/5 stars
Side Driver:	5/5 stars
Side Rear Passenger:	5/5 stars
Rollover:	4/5 stars

All models come standard with enhanced Vehicle Stability Control which immediately alters electric powering steering assist w/traction control (hybrids come standard with VDIM), anti-lock brakes, brake assist and electronic brakeforce distribution. Also standard is a tire pressure monitor, a driver's knee airbag, front seat-mounted side torso airbags, side curtain airbags for all three rows which includes a rollover sensor and active front headrests. Hill Start Assist Control (HAC) is also standard which prevents rolling backwards on slopes, and Downhill Assist Control (DAC) is standard on AWD trims.

The IIHS rates the Highlander "Good" overall in their frontal offset crash test, and good in all subcategories except for "Head/neck," which is rated as "Acceptable." And "Good" overall in the side impact crash test, with "Good" rating in all nine measured categories. The Highlander is also rated "Good" in the roof strength test, giving it a "top safety pick" rating.

In Australasian New Car Assessment Program (ANCAP) testing the Kluger is given a rating but only a rating for pedestrian protection.

ANCAP test results* Toyota Kluger / Highlander 2WD & 4WD variants (2008)
Test	Score
Overall	4 /5 stars
Frontal offset	13.31/16
Side impact	16/16
Pole	2/2
Seat belt reminders	2/3
Whiplash protection	Not Assessed
Pedestrian protection	Poor
Electronic stability control	Standard

The safety and effectiveness of the Highlander/Kluger's Vehicle Stability Control system has been questioned by some motoring journalists. During testing for Wheels magazine Car of the Year in 2007, the magazine's editor rolled the vehicle during high-speed gravel road testing. Noting that it was the first such event in the magazine's 45-year history, he criticised the vehicle's stability system stating that "Deficiencies in the Kluger's ESP contributed to the crash". Six of the seven other judges also stated that they felt "the vehicle's ESP performance was sub-standard", and remarked that the vehicle was "almost dangerous on dirt [roads]". In a written response, Toyota disputed the circumstances of the accident and criticised the testing procedures as "unscientific".

=== Hybrid ===
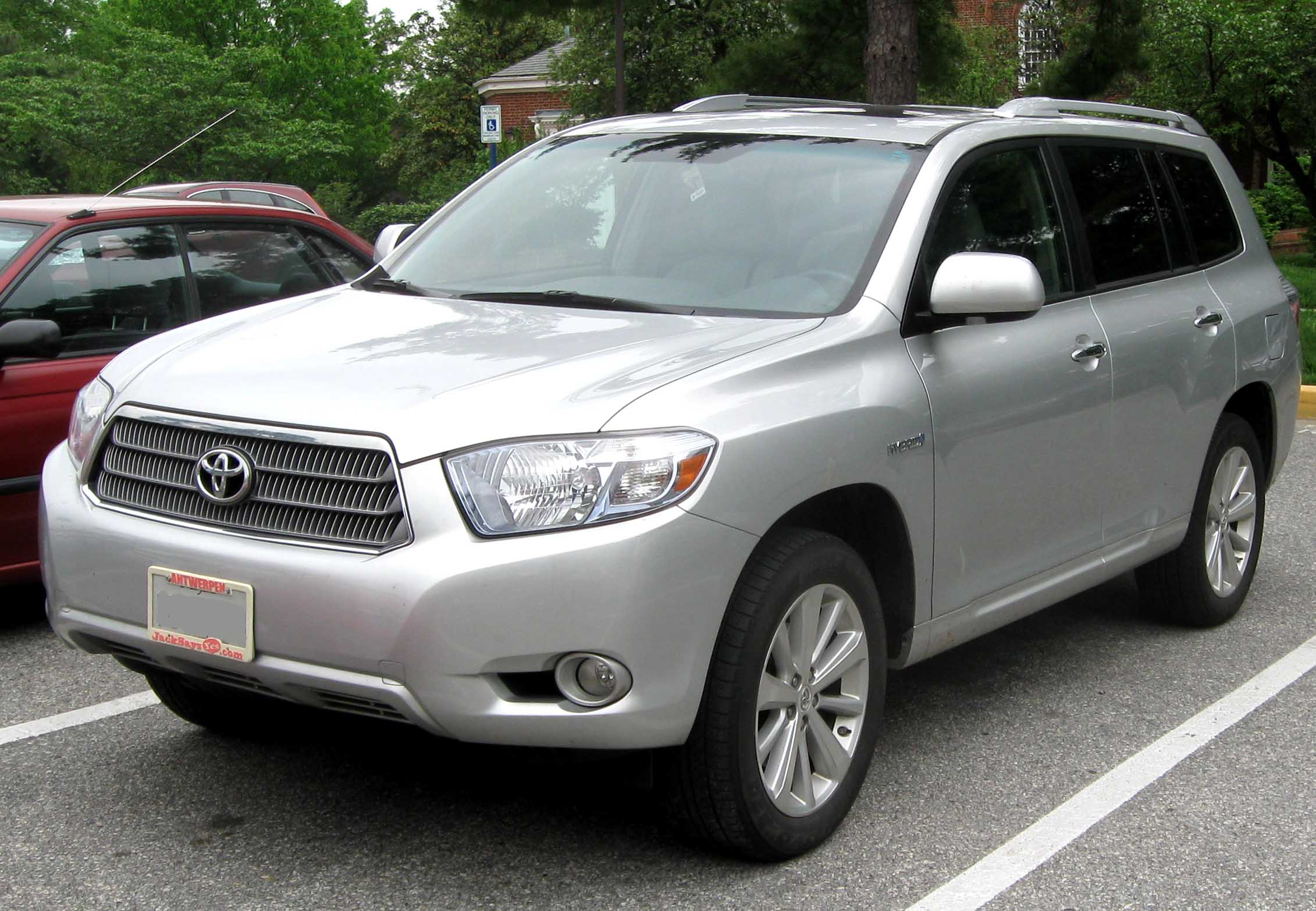
Pre-facelift Toyota Highlander Hybrid Limited (US)

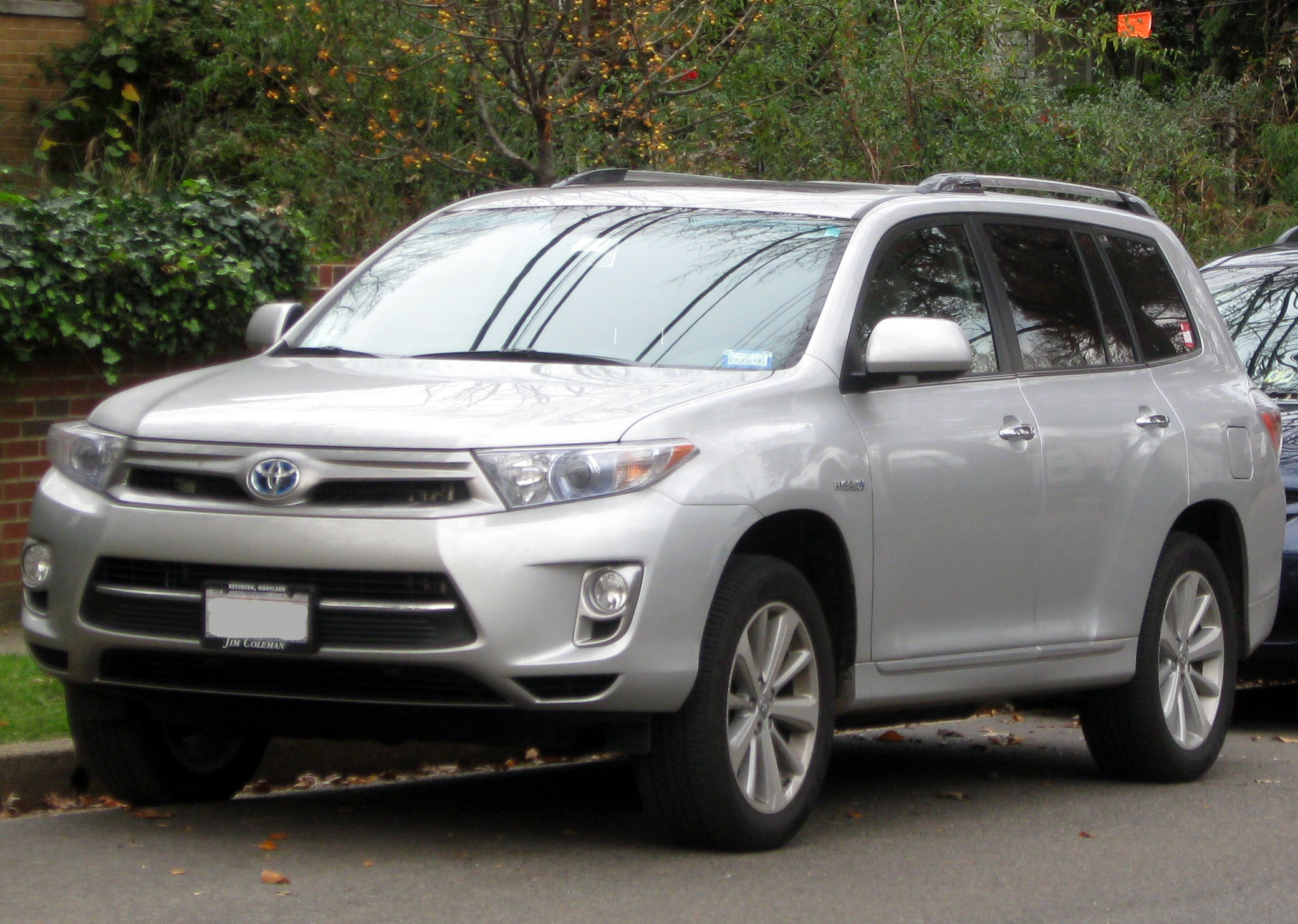
Facelift Toyota Highlander Hybrid Limited (US)

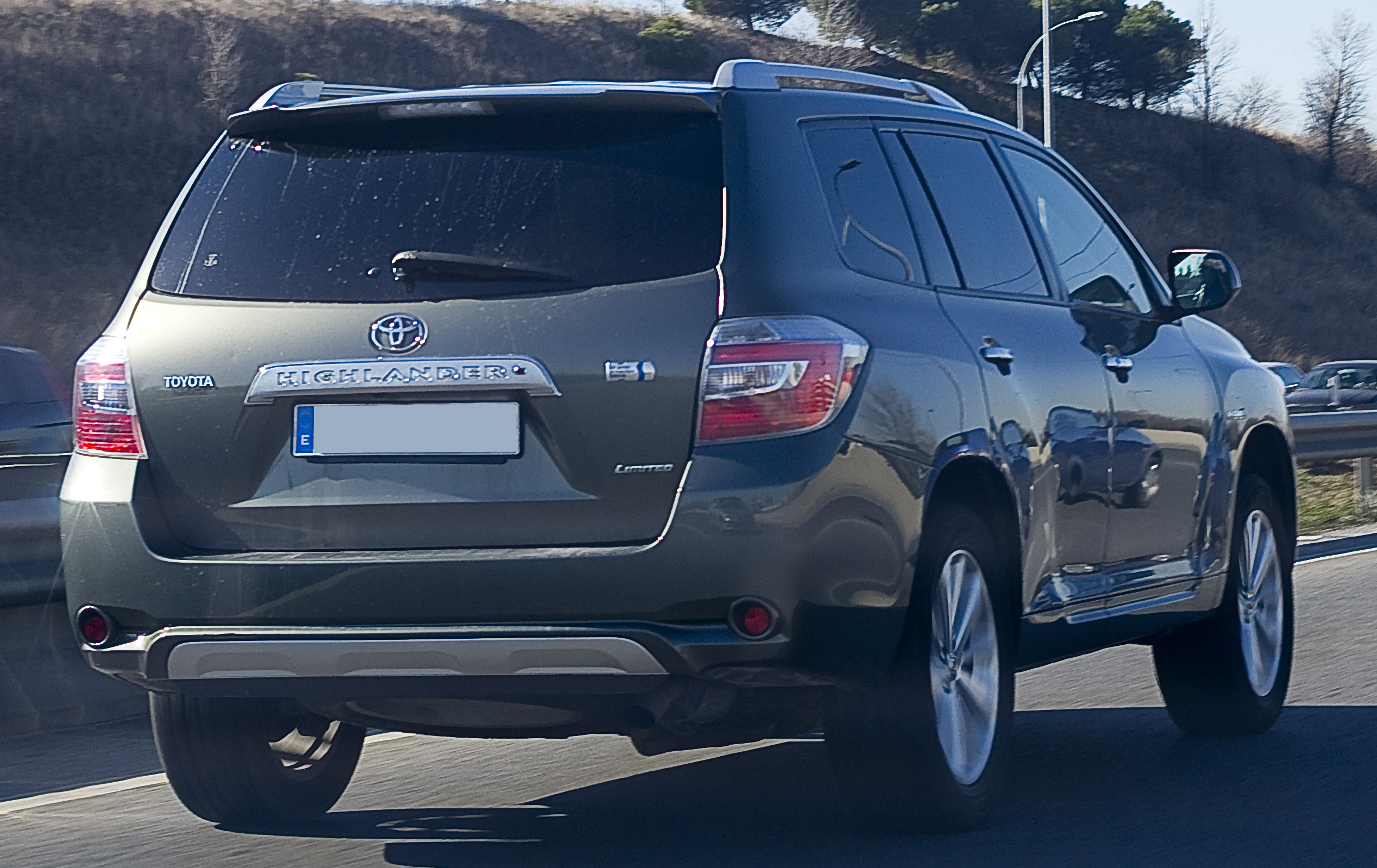
Pre-facelift Toyota Highlander Hybrid Limited (Spain)

The Hybrid features Toyota's Hybrid Synergy Drive which continues to allow an electric only powered mode for short distances and speeds. Weight and cost have been improved over the previous hybrid.

The expanded size and new features have led to an increase of 500 pounds to its curb weight. All Highlander Hybrids are all-wheel drive, and the EPA has rated the hybrid at 8.7 L/100 km; 32 mpg_{‑imp} (27 mpg_{‑US}) for the city and 9.4 L/100 km; 30 mpg_{‑imp} (25 mpg_{‑US}) for the highway, same as the previous model. The Highlander's fuel economy, while better than the Lexus RX 400h's, lags behind the compact 4cyl Ford Escape Hybrid, which ceased production in 2012, and the latest RX 450h, but still produces significantly fewer emissions than the non-hybrid version with a CARB SULEV rating.

The Highlander Hybrid continues to use the same 3.3-liter 3MZ-FE V6 (155 kW (208 hp; 211 PS)) offered in AWD from the prior model, net power is 175 kW (235 hp; 238 PS). VDIM and Electronically Controlled Brake remain new features include a driver selectable electric only EV mode (when possible) and another ECON mode which restricts acceleration and minimizes air conditioning during acceleration. The Highlander Hybrid Hybrid uses a 1.9 kWh sealed nickel-metal hydride traction battery.

For the 2011 model year the Highlander Hybrid received styling changes and was upgraded with the 3.5-liter 2GR-FXE V6 (183 kW (245 hp; 248 PS)), increasing net power by 7 kW (10 hp; 10 PS), and a powertrain similar to the RX450h. The vehicle is now rated at 8 L/100 km; 34 mpg_{‑imp} (28 mpg_{‑US}) for the city, highway and combined cycles.

=== Highlander FCHV (2007) ===
The Highland FCHV was a test vehicle using compressed hydrogen gas, with average fuel economy of 109.9 km/kg (68.3 mi/kg) (approximate mpg equivalent).

The vehicle was unveiled at the 2007 LA Auto Show.

=== Chinese version ===
The Chinese version of the Highlander (ASU40/GSU45) was unveiled in 2009 at the 13th Shanghai International Automobile Industry Exhibition.

== Third generation (XU50; 2013) ==
Third generation
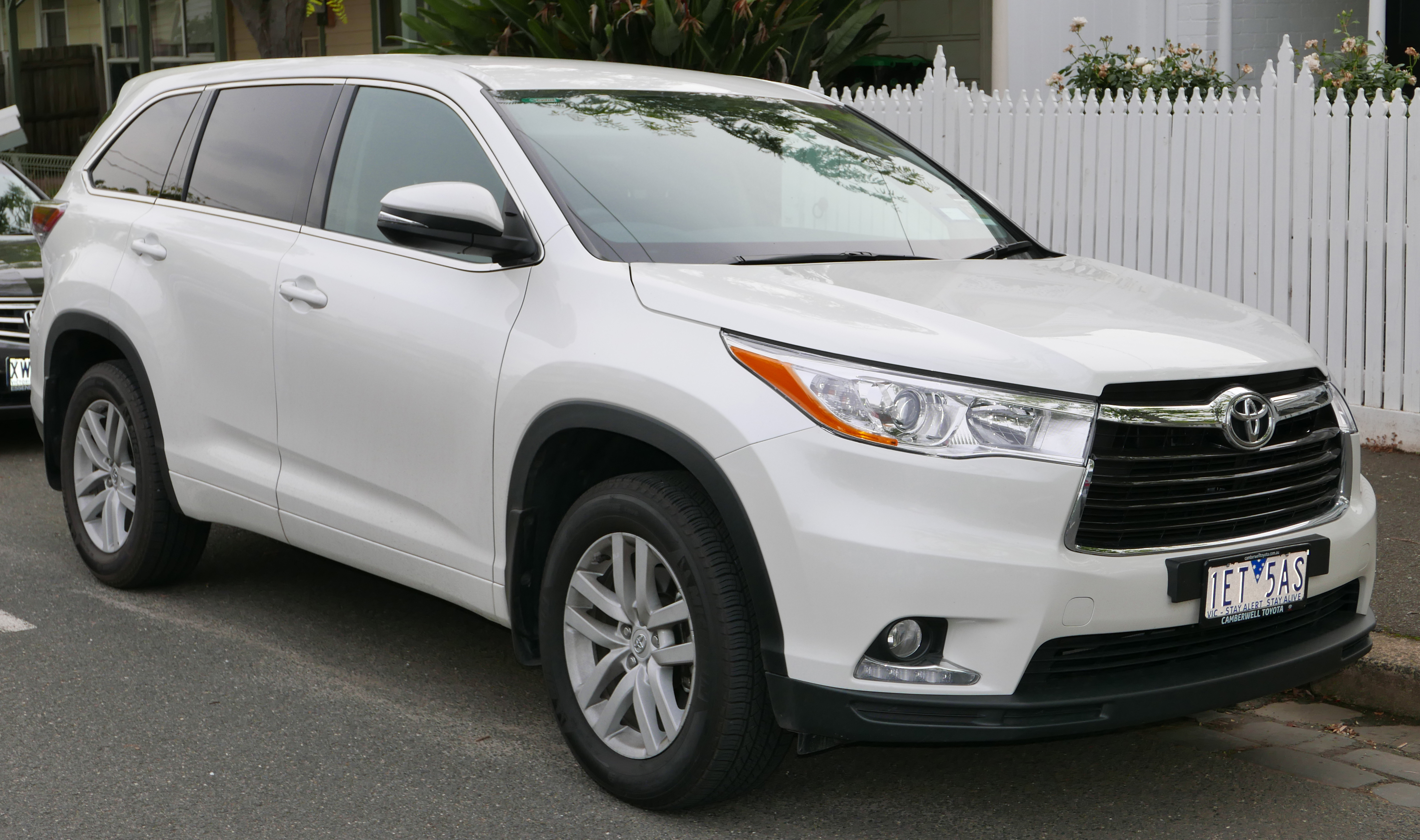
- 2015 Toyota Kluger GX (GSU55; pre-facelift)

Overview
- Model code: XU50
- Also called: Toyota Kluger (Australia)
- Production: November 2013 – November 2019
- Model years: 2014–2019; 2014–2021 (China)
- Assembly: United States: Princeton, Indiana (TMMI); China: Guangzhou (GAC Toyota)
- Designer: Matt Sperling (2009)

Body and chassis
- Platform: Toyota K platform
- Related: Lexus RX (AL20); Toyota Sienna (XL30)

Powertrain
- Engine: Gasoline: 2.0 L 8AR-FTS I4 turbo (China); 2.7 L 1AR-FE I4; 3.5 L 2GR-FE V6; 3.5 L 2GR-FXE V6 (hybrid); 3.5 L 2GR-FKS V6 (2016–2019); 3.5 L 2GR-FXS V6 (hybrid) (2016–2019)
- Transmission: 6-speed U660E/760E automatic; 8-speed UA80E/UA80F automatic (2016–2019)

Dimensions
- Wheelbase: 2,789 mm (109.8 in)
- Length: 4,854 mm (191.1 in)
- Width: 1,925 mm (75.8 in)
- Height: 1,730 mm (68.1 in)
- Curb weight: 2,045 kg (4,508 lb)

On 27 March 2013, Toyota unveiled the third generation XU50 series Highlander at the New York International Auto Show, with the vehicle reached dealerships in early 2014. Production began on 5 December. The XU50 version is longer and wider than the outgoing generation and its design has changed from its boxy look to one that is similar to other mid-size crossover SUVs.

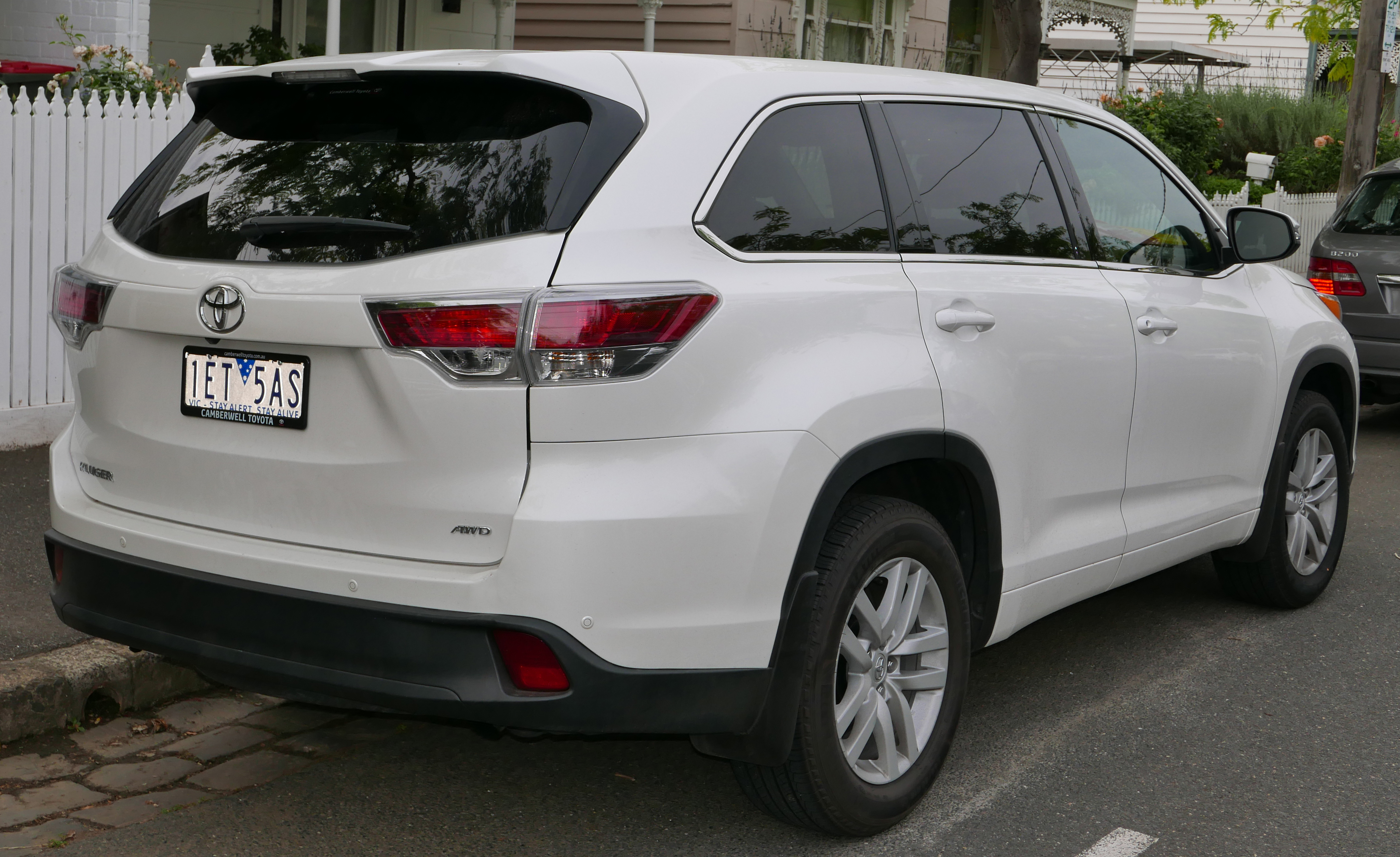
Rear view (pre-facelift)

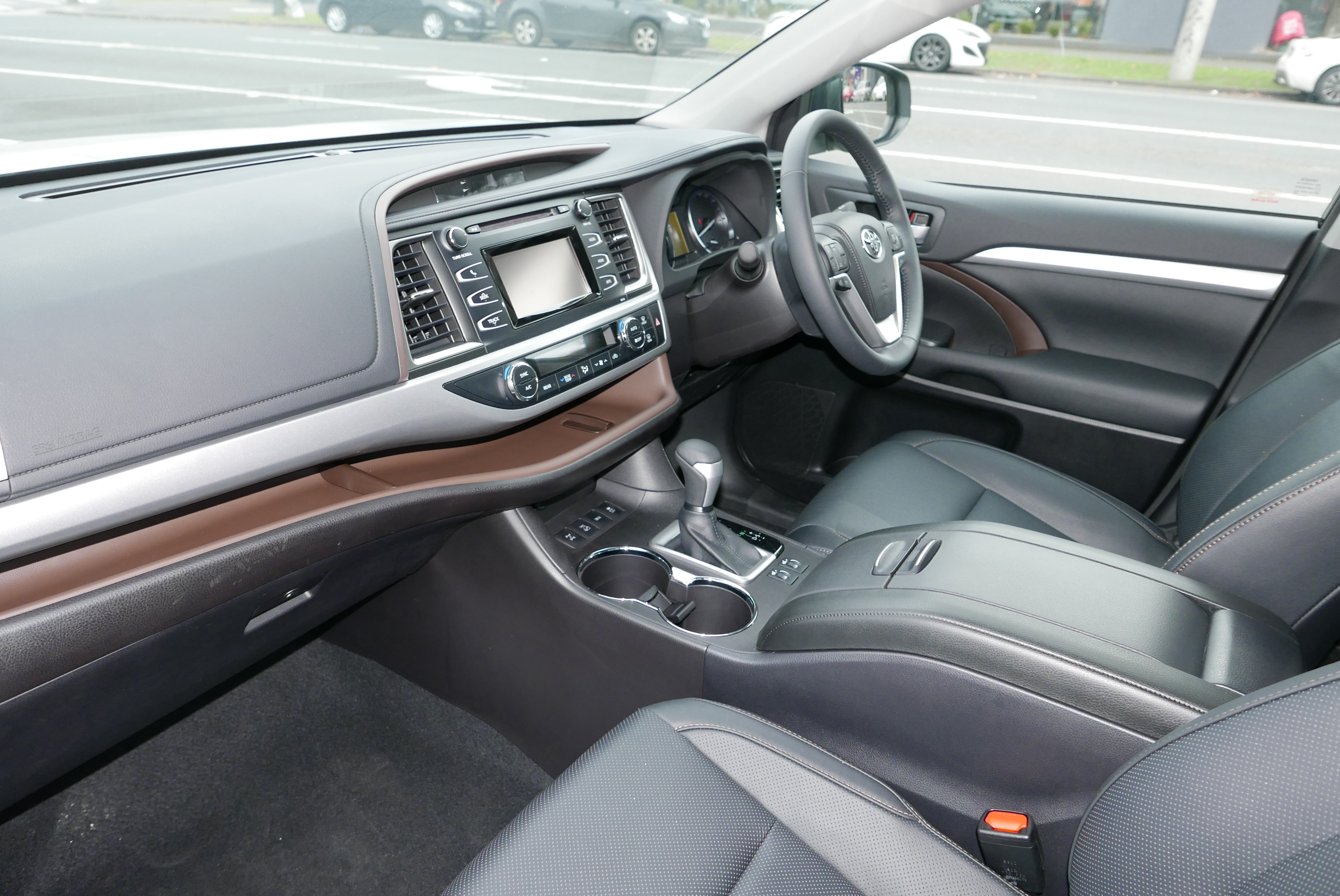
Interior

In addition to the changes, the XU50 featured seating for eight people with a sliding second-row point of entry that gives it 109 mm (4.3 in) of added width space, soft-touch materials on the instrument panel, lane-departure warning, pre-collision warning and blind spot monitoring systems. HD Radio and Bluetooth was standard on all trims for the US version, which will also come equipped with Toyota's Entune multimedia system along with a 6.1-inch touchscreen display audio system. An eight-inch touchscreen system and Toyota's Entune app suite with 12 JBL speakers were offered as an optional feature. The three powertrain trims that were offered include a 2.7-liter, six-speed automatic, front-wheel drive base model, a 3.5-liter, six-speed automatic model in both front- or all-wheel drive, and the AWD-only Hybrid trim with a 3.5-liter V6 mated to an eCVT.

The Highlander is also approved for use as a New York City taxicab.

For the third-generation model, Toyota Motor Sales USA took the role of producing the Kluger for Australia and New Zealand after Japanese production of the second-generation model ended in 2013. When the model was replaced with the succeeding XU70 model in 2019, production in the US continued for exports to both countries until 2021.

=== 2016 facelift ===
A refreshed 2017 model year Highlander appeared at the New York International Auto Show in March 2016 with sales starting in the fourth quarter of 2016. In V6 powered models, an eight-speed automatic replaced the six-speeder and the revised V6 engine (now designated 2GR-FKS for pure gasoline models, 2GR-FXS for hybrid models) added Toyota's D4-S direct injection fuel system. The facelifted Highlander has an updated fascia with restyled headlights and tail lights, addition of SE trim, XLE and LE Hybrid trims, and updated exterior and interior colors.

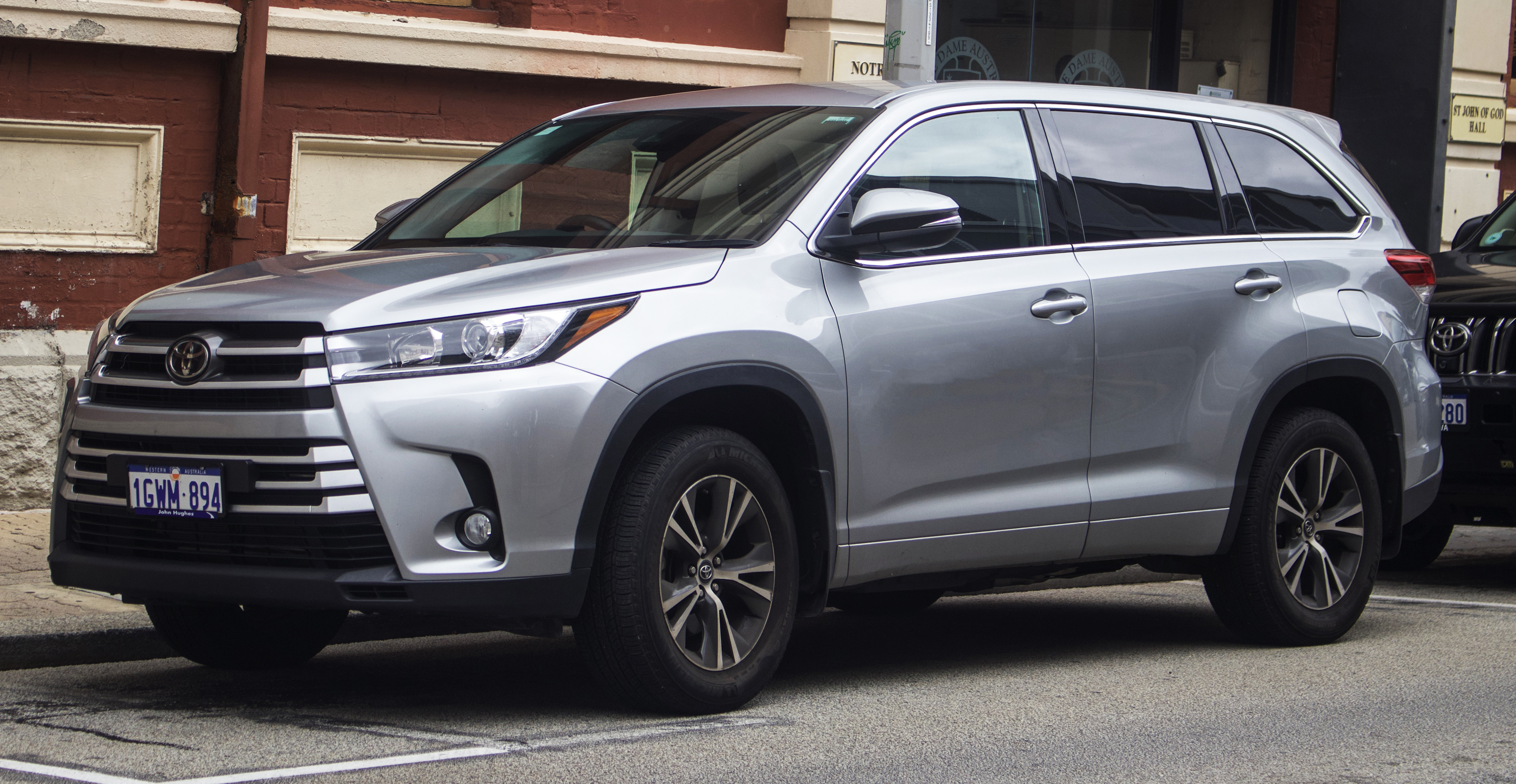
Front (Australia, GX)

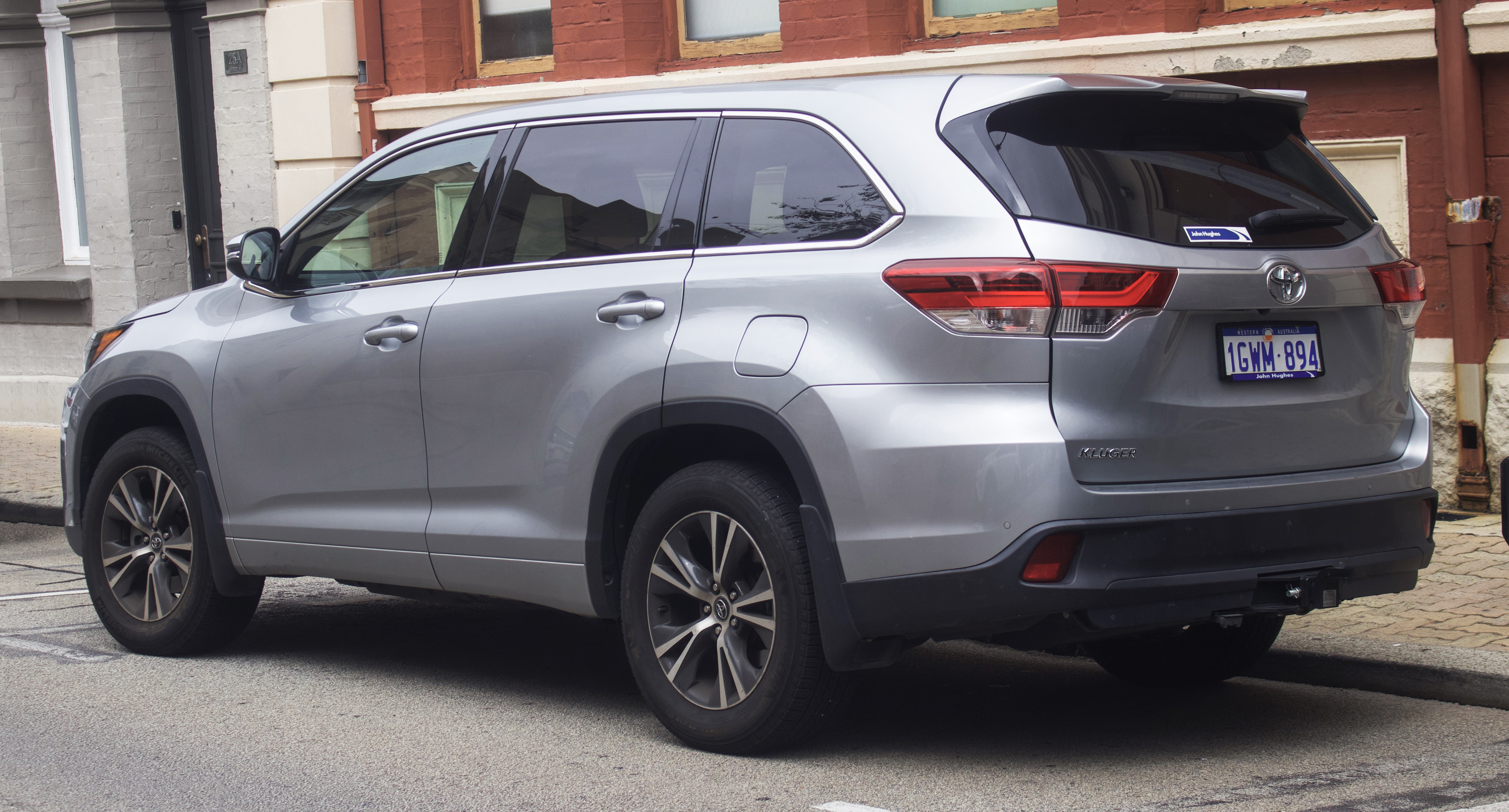
Rear (Australia, GX)
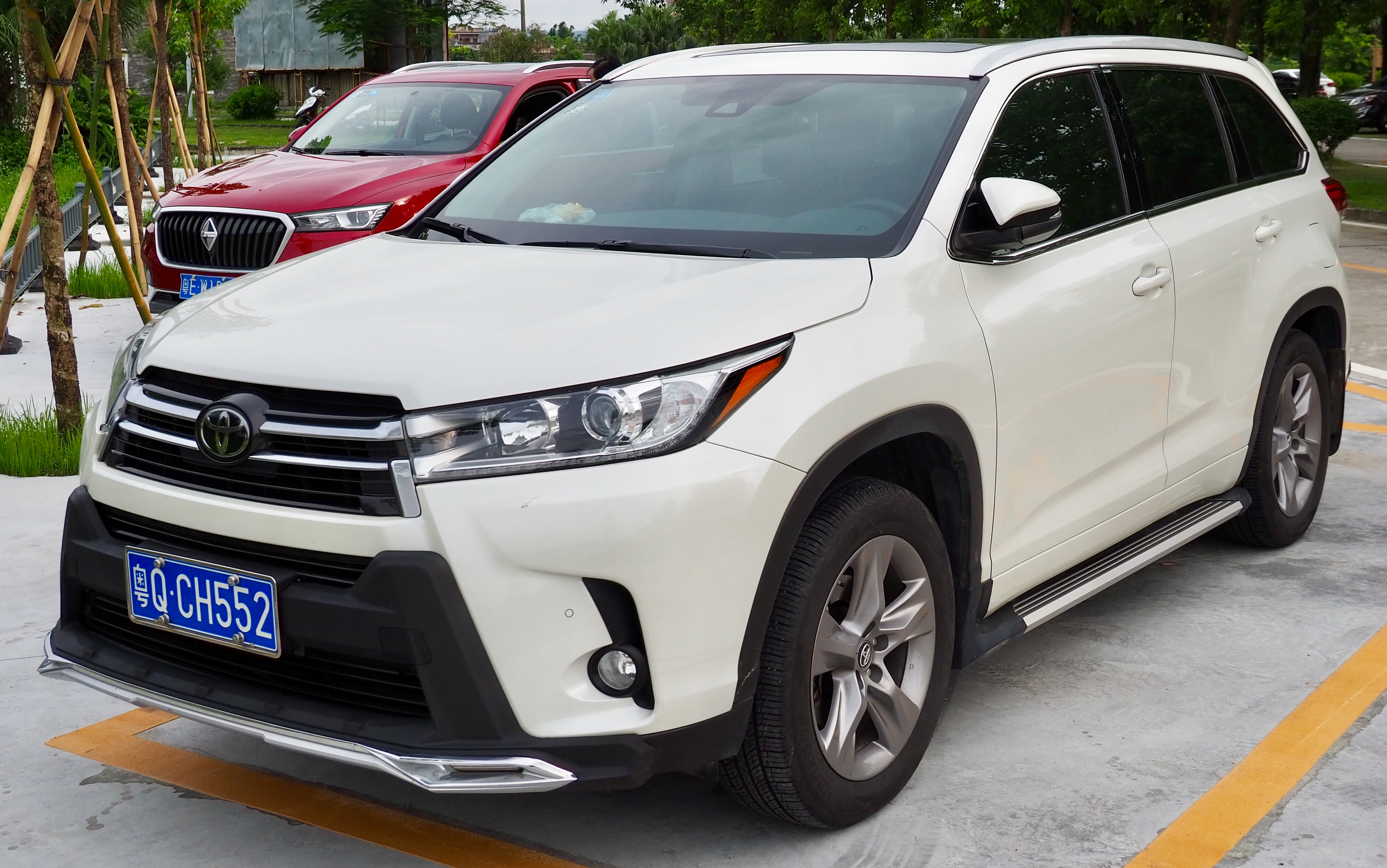
Front (China, Sport)

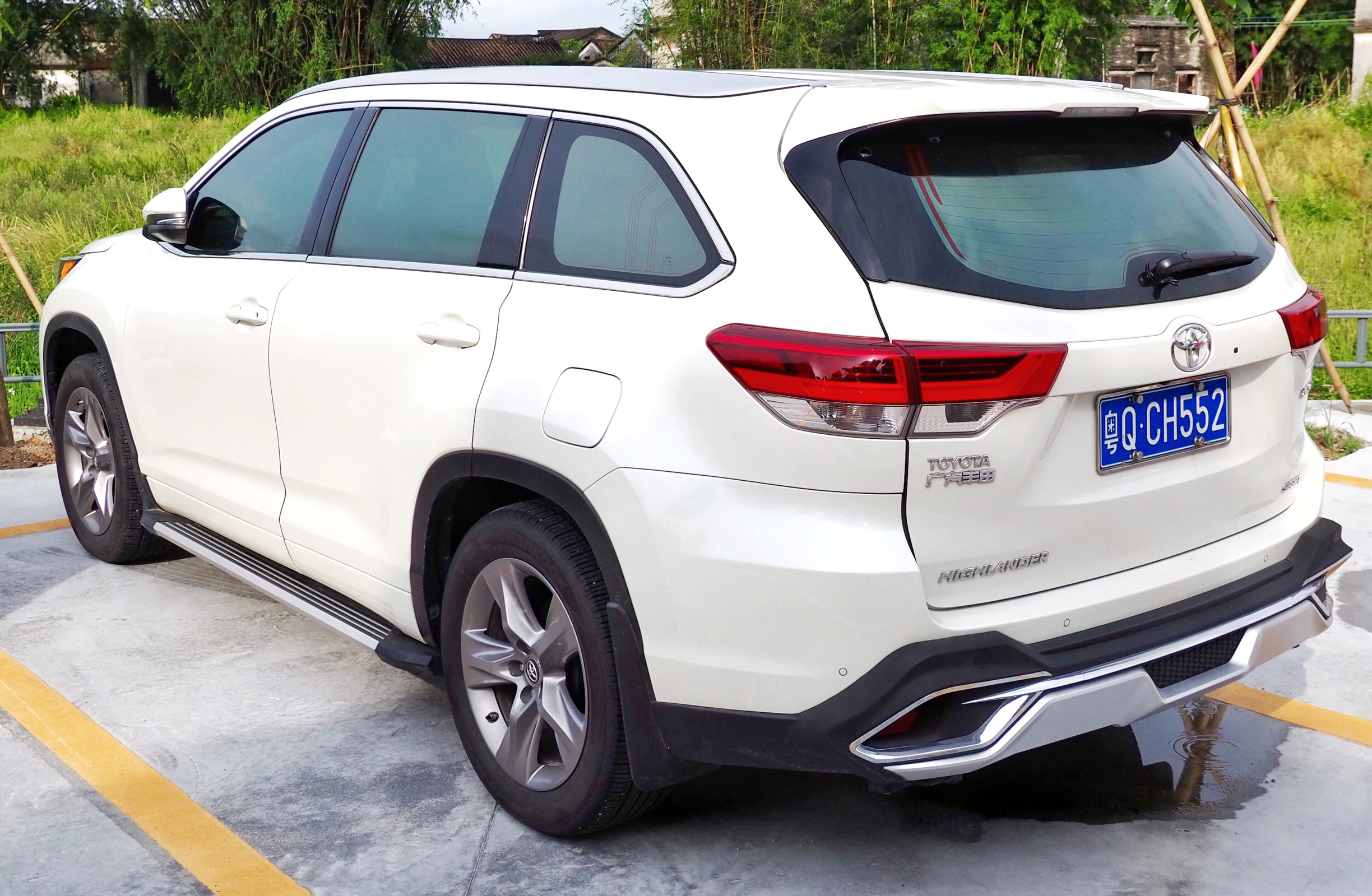
Rear (China, Sport)

=== Safety ===
2016 Toyota Highlander on NHTSA:
Overall:	5/5 stars
Frontal Driver:	4/5 stars
Frontal Passenger:	5/5 stars
Side Driver:	5/5 stars
Side Passenger:	5/5 stars
Side Pole Driver:	5/5 stars
Rollover AWD:	16.9%

2015 Toyota Highlander on IIHS:
Category	Rating
Moderate overlap frontal offset	Good
Small overlap frontal offset (driver) (2014–2015)	Acceptable^{1}
Small overlap frontal offset (passenger)	Acceptable^{2}
Side impact	Good
Roof strength	Good^{3}

^{1} vehicle structure rated "Acceptable"
^{2} vehicle structure rated "Marginal"
^{3} strength-to-weight ratio: 5.40

ANCAP test results* Toyota Kluger / Highlander (2014)
Test	Score
Overall	5 /5 stars
Frontal offset	14.97/16
Side impact	16/16
Pole	2/2
Seat belt reminders	2.6/3
Whiplash protection	Good
Pedestrian protection	Marginal
Electronic stability control	Standard

ANCAP test results* Toyota Kluger / Highlander (2014)
Test	Score
Overall	5 /5 stars
Frontal offset	14.97/16
Side impact	16/16
Pole	2/2
Seat belt reminders	2.6/3
Whiplash protection	Good
Pedestrian protection	Marginal
Electronic stability control	Standard

== Fourth generation (XU70; 2019) ==
Fourth generation
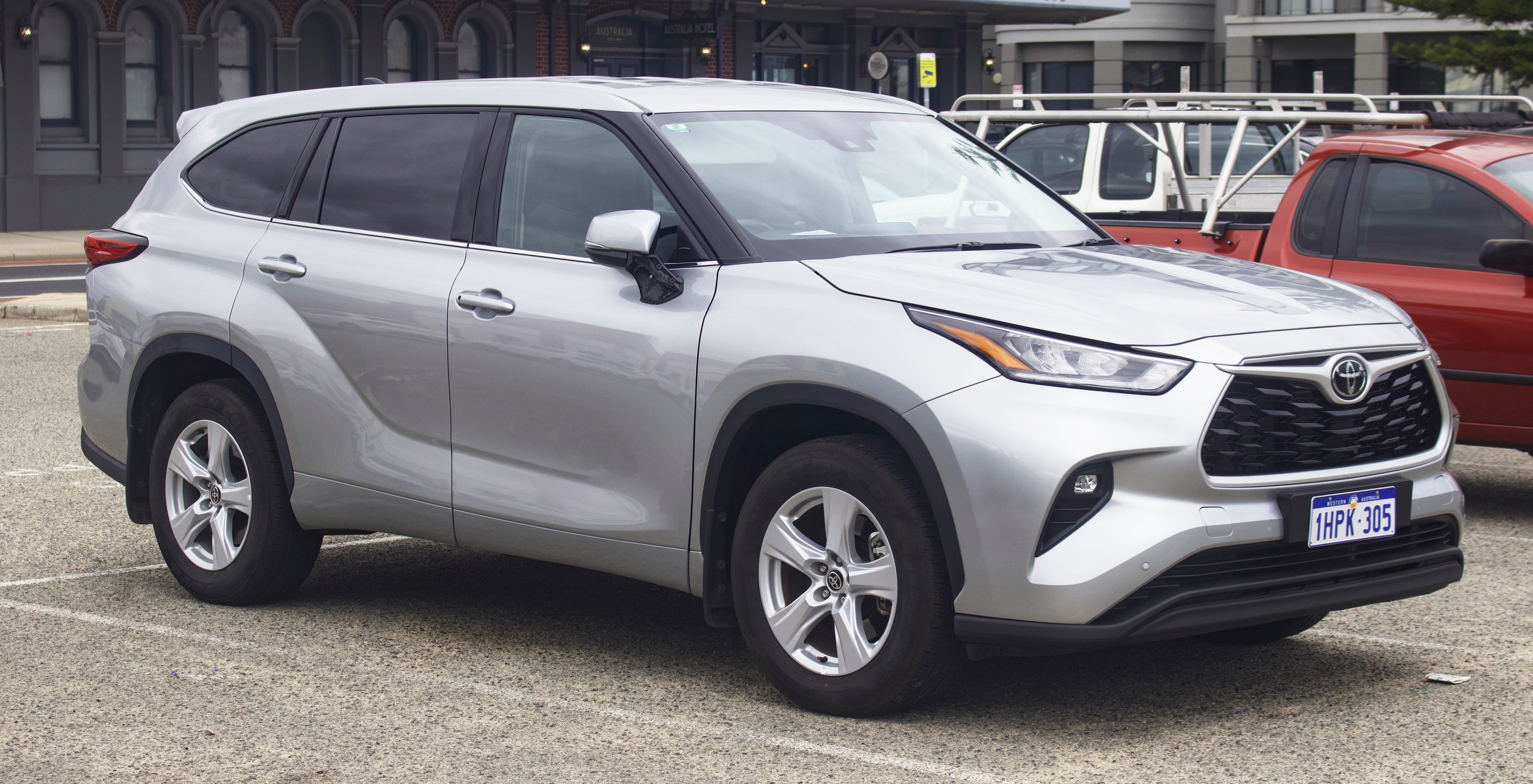
- 2023 Toyota Kluger GX (XU70; Australia)

Overview
- Model code: XU70
- Also called: Toyota Kluger (Australia); Toyota Crown Kluger (China, FAW Toyota)
- Production: November 2019 – present
- Model years: 2020–2026
- Assembly: United States: Princeton, Indiana (TMMI); China: Guangzhou (GAC Toyota); Tianjin (FAW Toyota)
- Designer: Yoshikazu Saeki

Body and chassis
- Platform: TNGA: GA-K
- Related: Lexus RX (ALA10/ALH10); Toyota Grand Highlander (AS10); Toyota Crown Crossover; Toyota Sienna (XL40); Lexus TX

Powertrain
- Engine: Gasoline: 2.0 L S20A-FTS turbo I4 (2022–present); 2.4 L T24A-FTS turbo I4 (2022–present); 2.5 L A25C-FKS I4 (China); 2.5 L A25G-FKS I4 (Crown Kluger); 3.5 L 2GR-FKS V6 (2020–2022); Gasoline hybrid; 2.5 L A25A-FXS I4; 2.5 L A25D-FXS I4 (China); 2.5 L A25H-FXS I4 (Crown Kluger)
- Electric motor: 2x Permanent Magnet Synchronous Motors 5NM + 40 kW (54 hp; 54 PS) 4NM (hybrid)
- Power output: 218–220 kW (292–295 hp; 296–299 PS) (3.5 L); 197.5 kW (265 hp; 269 PS) (2.4 L turbo); 179–184 kW (240–247 hp; 243–250 PS) (2.5 L hybrid, total system output)
- Transmission: 8-speed UA80F "Direct Shift" ECTi automatic; eCVT with sequential shift mode (hybrid)
- Hybrid drivetrain: Power-split (hybrid)
- Battery: 1.6 kW·h Ni-MH (hybrid)

Dimensions
- Wheelbase: 2,850 mm (112.2 in)
- Length: 4,950–5,014 mm (194.9–197.4 in)
- Width: 1,930 mm (76.0 in)
- Height: 1,730–1,755 mm (68.1–69.1 in)
- Curb weight: 1,880–2,018 kg (4,145–4,450 lb)

The fourth-generation Highlander was unveiled at the New York International Auto Show on 17 April 2019. It is built on GA-K platform. In the United States, the fourth-generation Highlander gasoline model went on sale on 18 December 2019 for the 2020 model year. Compared to the previous generation, there is increased cargo room behind the third row and support was added for both Apple CarPlay and Android Auto.

In Europe, the Highlander Hybrid went on sale in January 2021, solely with a hybrid powertrain. The Highlander for the UK market has been available since March 2021, a year later than the US models due to the extensive engineering work for right-hand-drive models, while the Kluger for the Australian market became available in June 2021. The Highlander was also launched across Gulf Cooperation Council countries around June and July 2020, where it is offered only as a Hybrid. The Highlander Hybrid was also launched in South Korea on 25 July 2023.

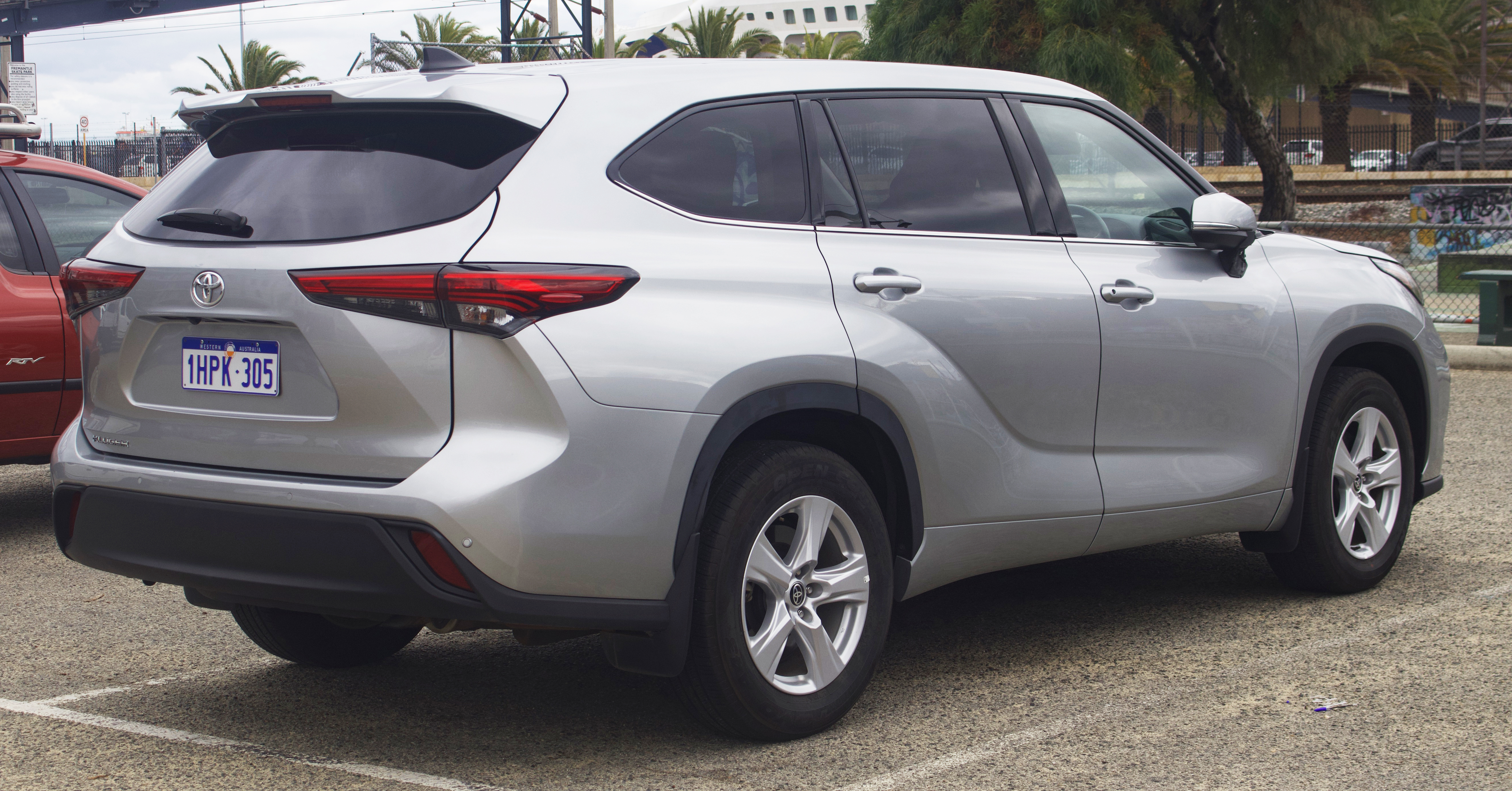
Rear view

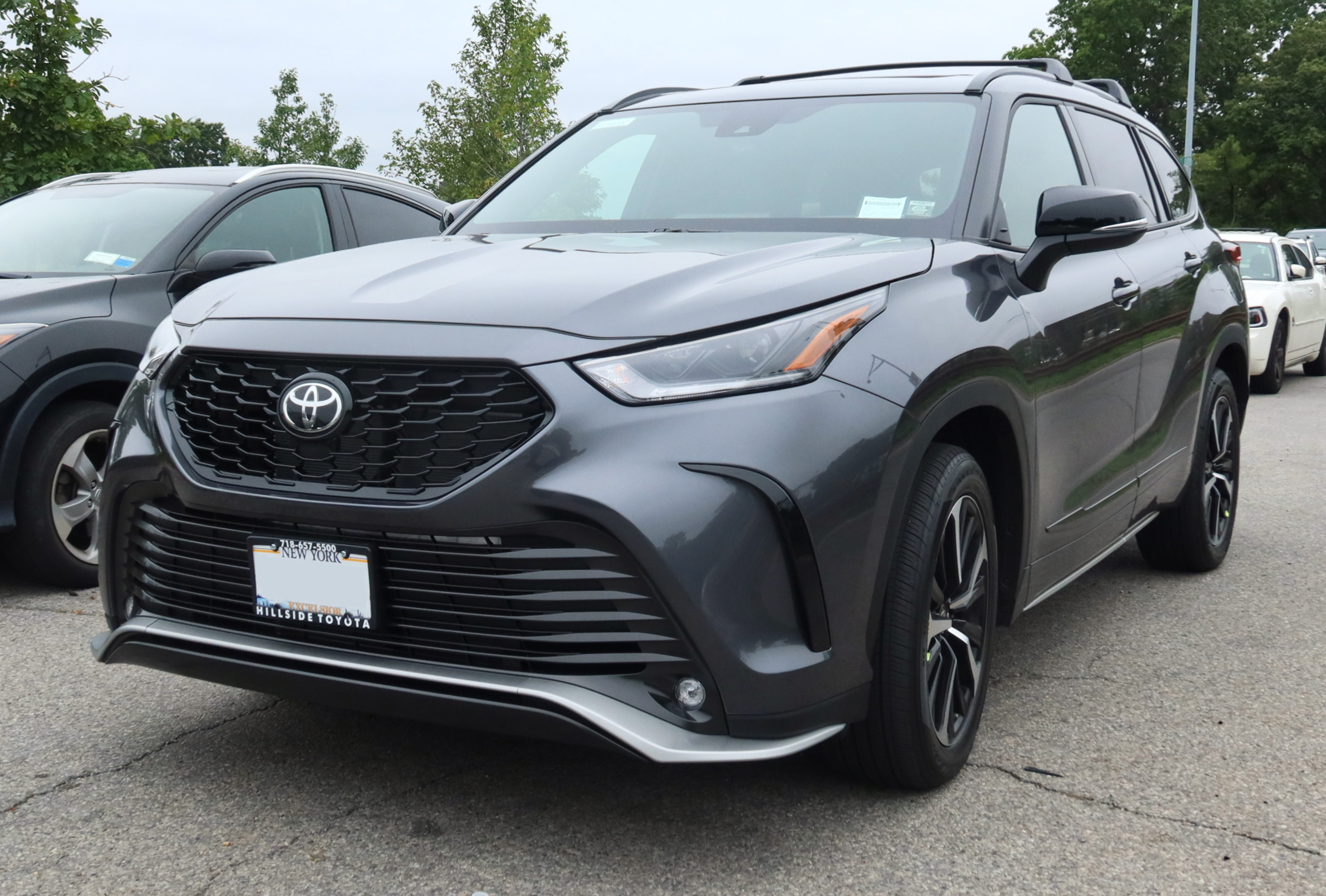
2021 Highlander XSE

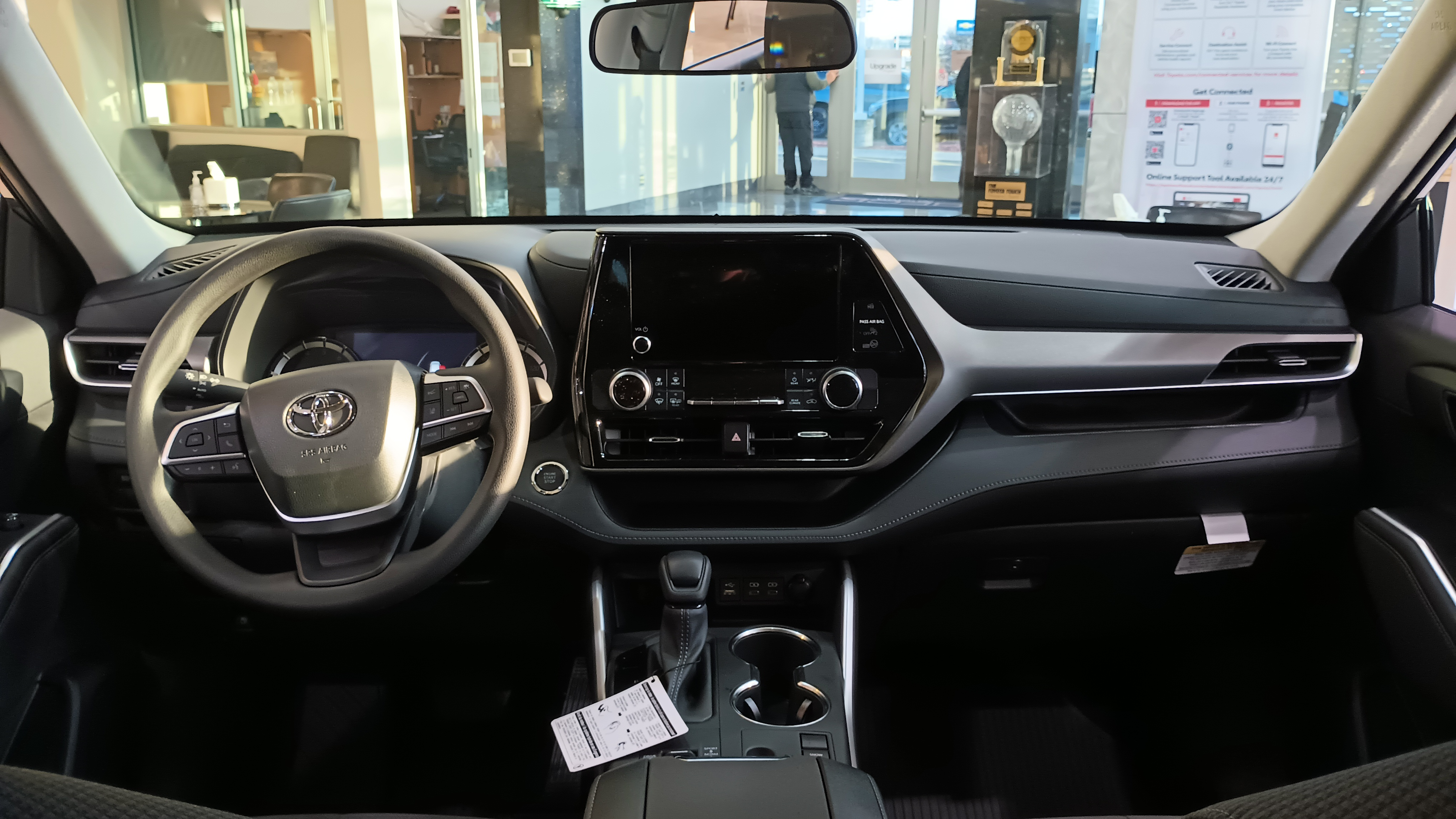
Interior

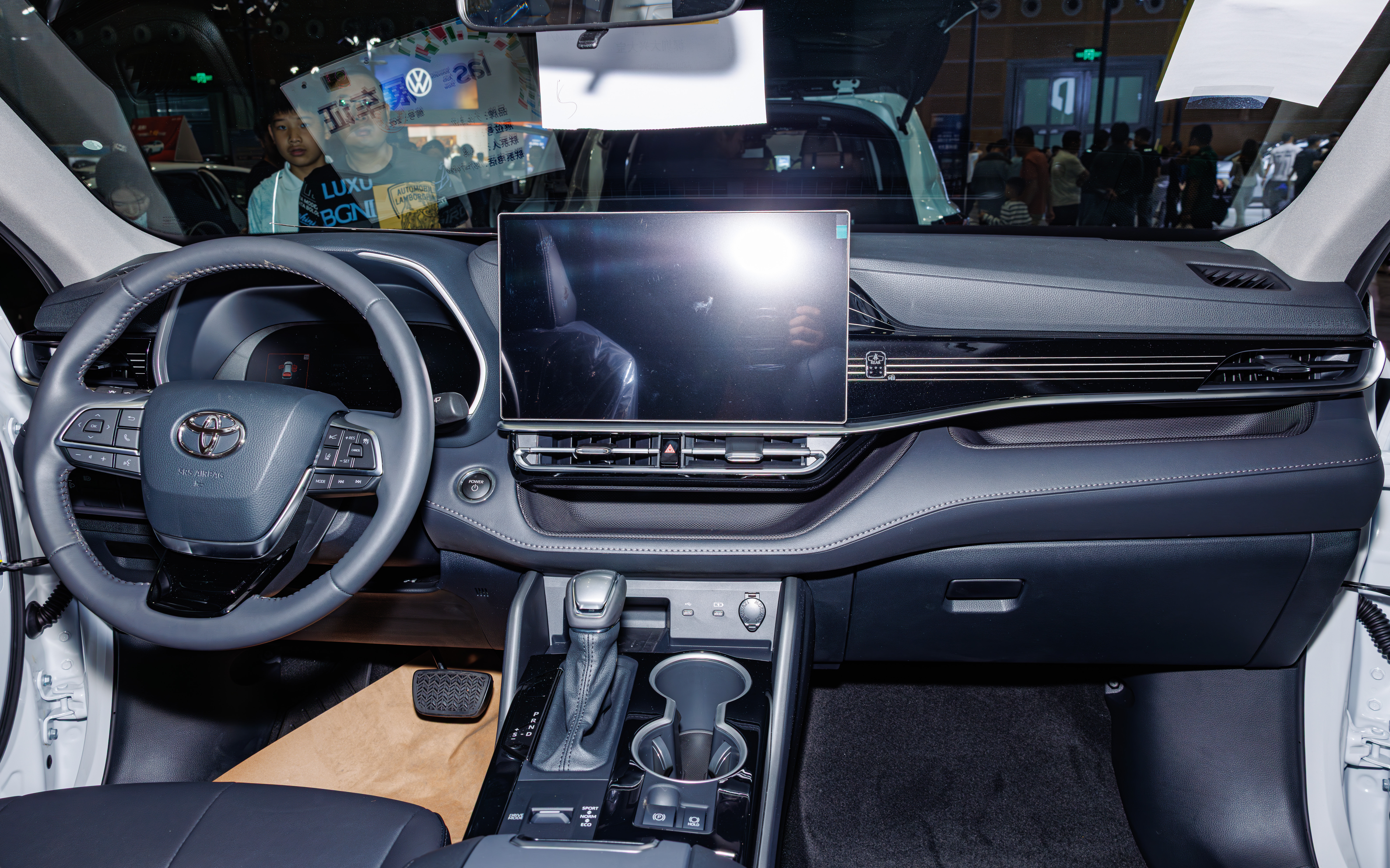
Interior (China; 2025)

=== China ===
In China, the fourth-generation Highlander was launched on 19 April 2021 at the Auto Shanghai. The Highlander continued to be built and sold by GAC Toyota joint venture. A twin model manufactured by FAW Toyota was launched simultaneously as the Crown Kluger (simplified Chinese: 皇冠陆放; traditional Chinese: 皇冠陸放; pinyin: Huángguàn Lùfàng). The Crown Kluger is based on the Highlander XSE sold in North America, with the Toyota badge on the front grille and steering wheel swapped for the Crown badge. Both are powered by a 2.5-liter engine with hybrid powertrain as an option.

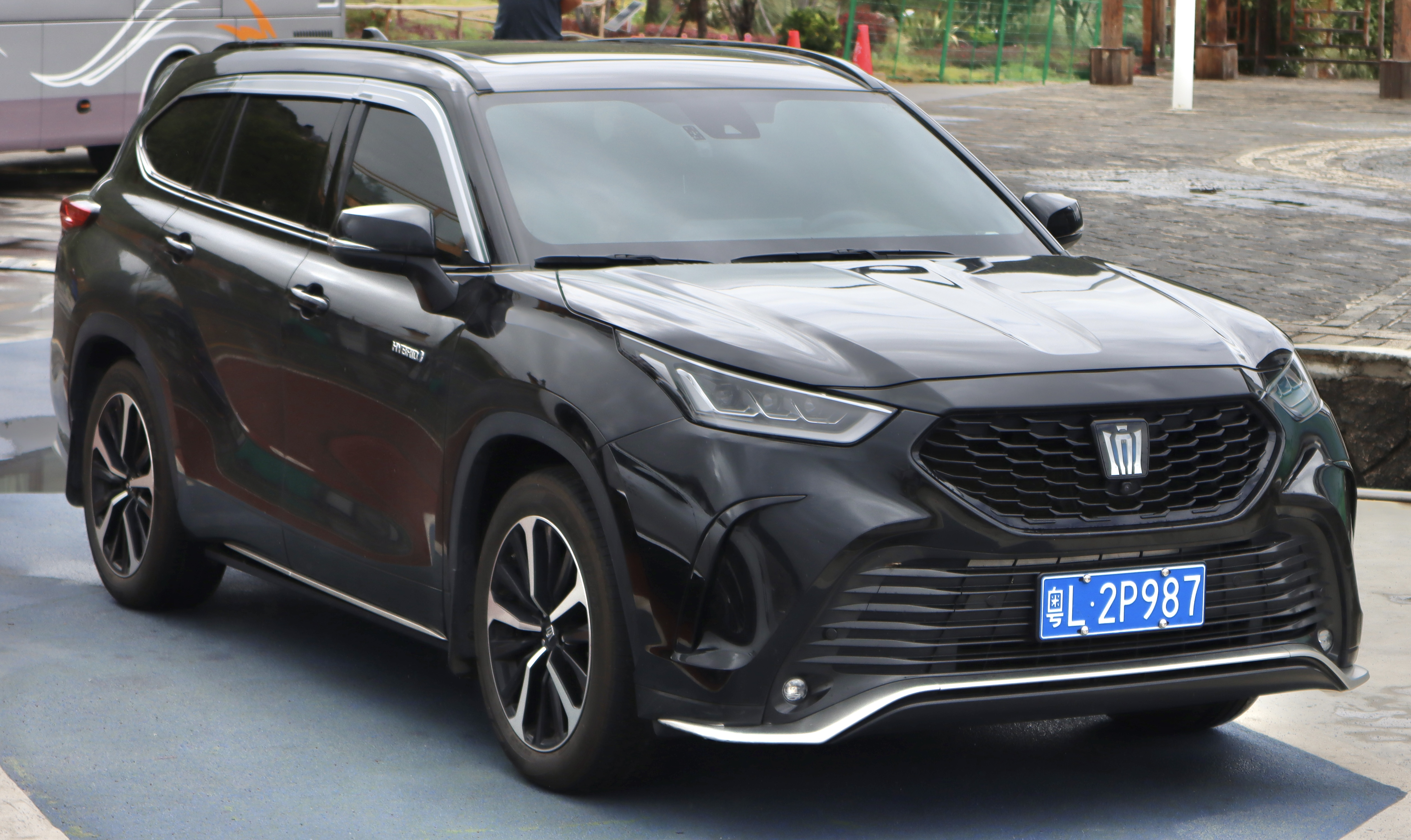
2021 Toyota Crown Kluger (China)

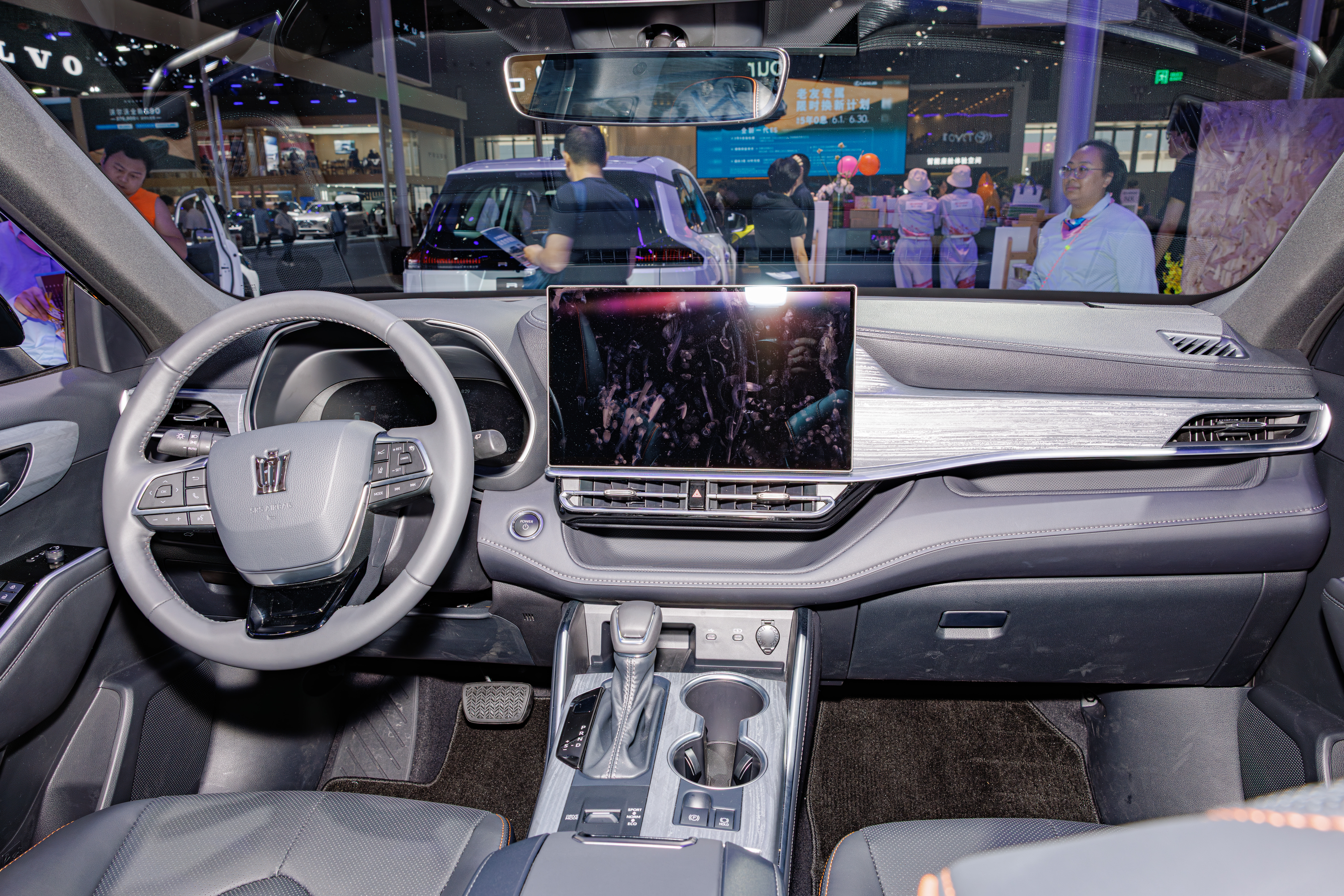
Interior (China; 2025)

=== Japan ===
In December 2025, Toyota announced that the Highlander would be available for the Japanese-market as an import from the US.

The fourth-generation Highlander was unveiled in April 2026. Unlike the first generation, it was badged as "Highlander" rather than "Kluger". It was available in a sole Limited ZR hybrid variant, which has the same specifications as the New Zealand-market Limited ZR.

=== North America ===
In North America, the fourth-generation Highlander is offered in L, LE, XLE, XSE, Limited, and Platinum grades. A 2.5-liter gasoline/electric hybrid four-cylinder engine and Electronic Continuously Variable Transmission (eCVT) are available on all but L and XSE, and are standard equipment on the Bronze Edition grade. All grades are available with either Front Wheel Drive (FWD) or All Wheel Drive (AWD), except for Platinum which only has AWD.

==== Yearly changes ====
- 2020, for the 2021 model year: In North America, the XSE trim was added with a revised front fascia. The L, LE and XLE trims came with standard LED projector headlights and a standard Toyota Safety Sense 2.5+ for all trims.
- 2021, for the 2022 model year: In the US, the Bronze Edition of the Highlander Hybrid was unveiled for the 2022 model year. It builds on the XLE Hybrid trim.
- 2022, for the 2023 model year: The 2.4-liter T24A-FTS turbocharged four-cylinder engine replaced the 3.5-liter 2GR-FKS V6 engine option. In the US, this change was made due to the implementation of tougher automotive emission standards for the 2023 model year imposed by the Environmental Protection Agency. The 2.4-liter unit has 22 kW (30 hp; 30 PS) less compared to the outgoing 3.5-liter unit, but has 17 percent more torque. In addition, Toyota claimed that the 2.4-liter unit cut NO_{x} and non-methane organic gas (NMOG) emissions by more than 50 percent. The hybrid powertrain remains unchanged. In addition to the updated powertrain, the Highlander also received some equipment updates as well.
- 2023, for the 2024 model year: The entry-level L trim was discontinued, and a powered tailgate became standard on the LE, XLE, XSE, Limited, and Platinum trim levels.
- 2024, for the 2025 model year: The Limited 25th Edition model was available limited to 2,500 units. The Hybrid model features AWD as standard on all trim levels and Beyond Zero HEV badges.
- 2025, for the 2026 model year: The LE trim was discontinued. AWD is standard on all trim levels.

=== Safety ===
The 2020 model year Highlander was awarded "Top Safety Pick" by IIHS, it received Good ratings in at least six crash test evaluations and it did not receive the higher-tier award as the base trim LED reflector headlights had poor visibility and produce excessive glare.

IIHS scores (US model year 2020)
Small overlap front (driver)	Good		
Small overlap front (passenger)	Good		
Moderate overlap front (original test)	Good		
Side (original test)	Good		
Side (updated test)	Good		
Roof strength	Good		
Head restraints and seats	Good		
Headlights (varies by trim/option)	Good	Acceptable	Poor
Front crash prevention: vehicle-to-vehicle	Superior		
Front crash prevention: vehicle-to-pedestrian (Day)	Superior		
Child seat anchors (LATCH) ease of use	Good		

ANCAP test results Toyota Kluger / Highlander (2021, aligned with Euro NCAP)
Test	Points	%
Overall:	5 /5 stars	
Adult occupant:	34.53	90%
Child occupant:	43.22	88%
Pedestrian:	41.33	76%
Safety assist:	13.20	82%

== Fifth generation (2026) ==
Fifth generation
- 2027 Subaru Getaway, which is based on the fifth-generation Highlander.

Overview
- Also called: Subaru Getaway
- Production: 2027 (to commence)
- Model years: 2028
- Assembly: United States: Georgetown, Kentucky (TMMK)

Body and chassis
- Layout: Front-motor, front-wheel-drive; Dual-motor, all-wheel-drive
- Platform: TNGA: GA-K
- Related: Lexus TZ

Powertrain
- Electric motor: AC permanent magnet synchronous
- Power output: 221 hp (165 kW; 224 PS) (FWD); 338 hp (252 kW; 343 PS) (4WD); 420 hp (313 kW; 426 PS) (Getaway)
- Transmission: eAxle
- Battery: 76.96–95.82 kWh lithium-ion
- Range: 462 km (287 mi) (FWD, claimed); 435–515 km (270–320 mi) (4WD, claimed)
- Plug-in charging: NACS port 11 kW onboard charger (AC) 150 kW fast charging (DC)

Dimensions
- Wheelbase: 3,050 mm (120.1 in)
- Length: 5,050 mm (198.8 in)
- Width: 1,989 mm (78.3 in)
- Height: 1,709 mm (67.3 in)

The fifth-generation Highlander was unveiled on 10 February 2026. Unlike previous generations that offered gasoline and gasoline hybrid options, it is exclusively a battery electric vehicle. The design is similar to the bZ Large SUV concept unveiled in December 2021. Sales were originally to start in late 2026 with more models in early 2027. In mid-2026, Toyota announced that the Highlander would be delayed until 2027 (for the US 2028 model year) in order to make last-minute adjustments to ensure the vehicle is ready for launch. The outgoing fourth generation Highlander will continue production into December.

=== Subaru Getaway ===
Rear view

A rebadged version of the Highlander is marketed by Subaru as the Getaway. It was unveiled on 1 April 2026 at the New York International Auto Show. The Getaway was delayed until 2027 (for the US 2028 model year) along with the Highlander.

== Grand Highlander (AS10; 2023) ==
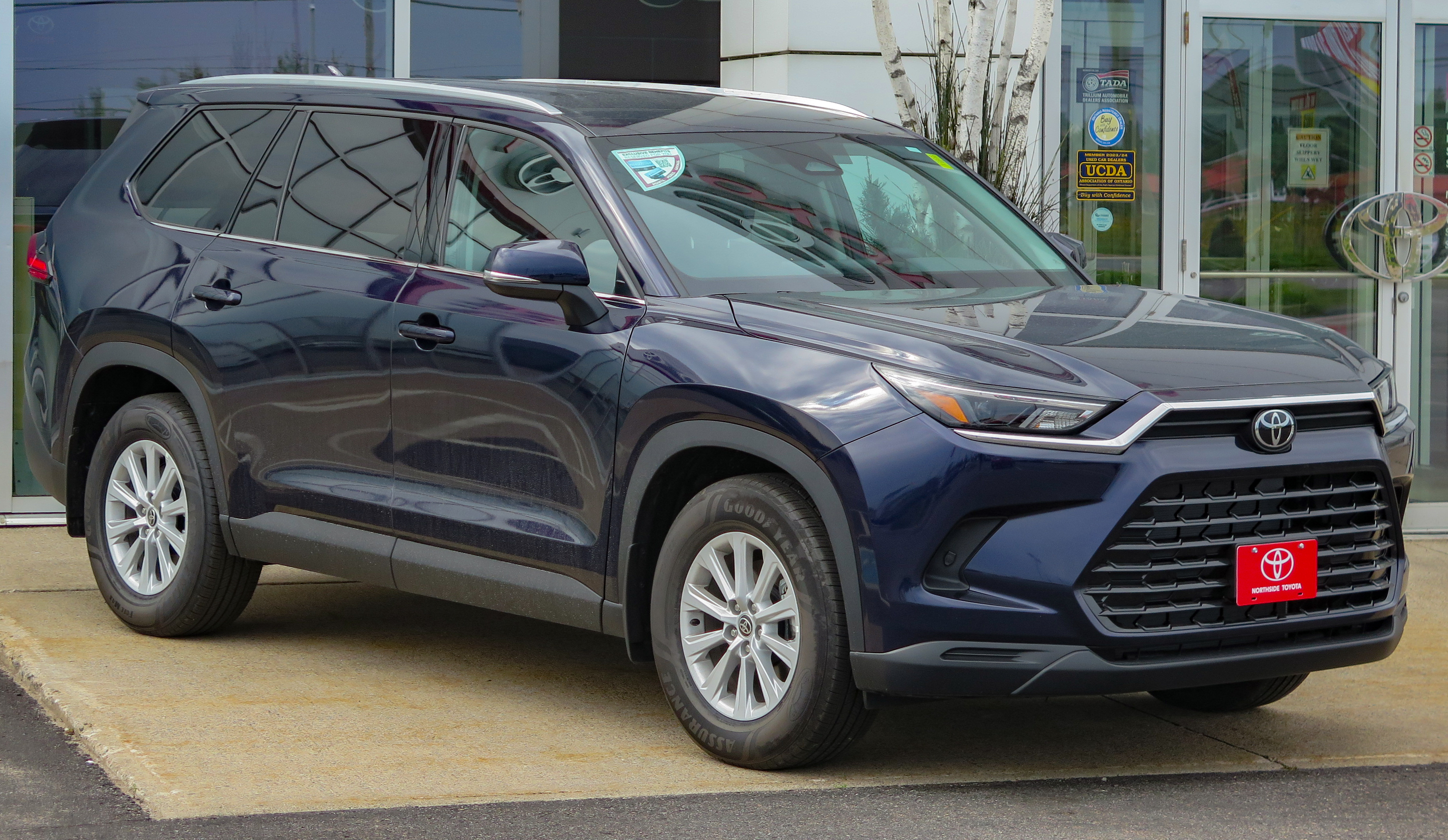
2024 Grand Highlander XLE AWD

The Grand Highlander was introduced for the North American market on 8 February 2023 as a larger alternative to the regular Highlander. Sharing the nameplate and the GA-K platform, the Grand Highlander features entirely different exterior and interior styling, as well as being longer, taller, and wider. It uses the same gasoline and gasoline hybrid powertrain as the Highlander, but also has an optional more powerful Hybrid MAX powertrain.

== Sales ==
Year	United States		Canada	Mexico	Australia	China		Europe
Year	Overall	Hybrid	Canada	Mexico	Australia	Highlander	Crown Kluger	Europe
2001	86,700	N/A						
2002	113,134	N/A						
2003	120,174	N/A			1,380			
2004	133,077	N/A			7,655			
2005	137,409	17,989	1,742		7,160			
2006	129,794	31,485	2,260		4,973			
2007	127,878	22,052	4,466	1,293	7,886			
2008	104,661	19,441	5,420	1,493	13,424			
2009	83,118	11,086	4,831	1,262	12,848	35,410		
2010	92,121	7,456	4,203	1,767	13,117	80,841		
2011	101,252	4,549	5,574	2,126	11,692	94,633		
2012	121,055	5,921	6,851	2,556	13,239	75,059		
2013	127,572	5,070	7,648	1,631	12,668	95,216		
2014	146,127	3,621	9,749	3,571	11,484	84,490		
2015	158,915	4,015	10,412	3,946	13,955	75,205		
2016	191,379	5,976	12,964	4,053	11,829	92,000		
2017	215,775	16,864	15,259	3,562	12,509	100,244		
2018	244,511	14,513	14,640	3,297	14,743	104,856		
2019	239,438	18,248	13,811	3,085	11,371	98,506		
2020	212,276	48,455	16,457	3,146	8,403	95,304		
2021	264,128	65,167	19,885	3,670	9,320	107,733	25,893	10,518
2022	222,805	43,711	9,328	3,611	12,562	85,835	47,146	8,576
2023	169,543	49,654		3,836	10,430	73,437	48,241	3,897
2024	89,658	24,777		5,195	9,868	78,884	52,672	6,458
2025	56,208	24,720				77,227	59,902	1,757

== See also ==
- List of Toyota vehicles
- List of Subaru vehicles
