= Toyota Canada =

Toyota Canada may refer to:

- Toyota Canada Inc., distributor
- Toyota Motor Manufacturing Canada, manufacturer
