= Toyota Motor Manufacturing Indiana =

Automobile plant near Princeton, Indiana, U.S.

Toyota Motor Manufacturing, Indiana, Inc.

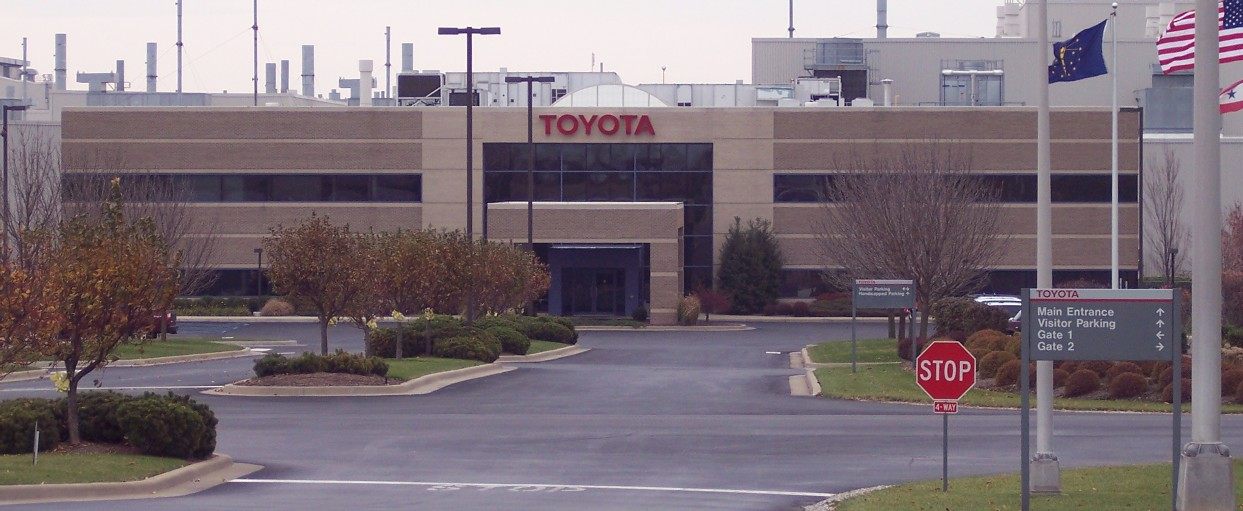
- Front entrance of TMMI
- Type: Subsidiary
- Industry: Automotive
- Founded: May 1996; 30 years ago
- Headquarters: Princeton, Indiana
- Key people: Jason Puckett (president)
- Products: Automobiles and engines
- Number of employees: 7,200 (2022)
- Parent: Toyota Motor North America

Toyota Motor Manufacturing Indiana (TMMI) is an automobile manufacturing plant complex located in Gibson County, Indiana, United States, nearly halfway between Princeton and Fort Branch, and mostly in Union Township. It is a subsidiary of Toyota Motor North America, itself a subsidiary of Toyota Motor Corporation of Japan. With over 7,000 employees, TMMI is the largest employer in the Evansville Area.

== History ==
Toyota Motor Manufacturing Indiana was built in May 1996 to begin production of a full-size pickup truck solely for the North American market. TMMI began production of the Tundra in 1999 for the 2000 model year, and Sequoia production began a year later for 2001. Both the Tundra and the Sequoia were new to the market and have only been sold in North America; the Tundra replaced the Toyota T100 in the US market.

In 2003, production of the Sienna minivan shifted to TMMI for the release of its redesigned 2004 model, while Toyota Motor Manufacturing Kentucky produced the Solara in place of the Sienna.

On July 10, 2008, Toyota announced that they would consolidate Tundra production at Toyota Motor Manufacturing Texas in San Antonio after 2008. Owing to the large unsold supply of Tundras and Sequoias, production of both Tundras and Sequoias would be suspended. Toyota also announced that production of the Highlander would be shifted to TMMI and would start in 2009. Production of the Sequoia later resumed, although at a reduced output.

== Layout ==
The roughly 4.5 million square foot factory is split into two different plants. The original factory, "West Plant," originally built to produce Tundras, began producing Highlanders then Sequoias but now produces Highlanders, Grand Highlanders, and in September 2023 began producing the Lexus TX. TMMI later expanded to add "East Plant" which produces Siennas, and now produces the bulk of Highlander orders as well. Both plants have joined weld, stamping, and plastic production sections. East Plant also started producing Highlanders as of 2016. Both plants have undergone large expansions to support the high domestic and worldwide demands for the Highlander, and Grand Highlander.

TMMI is the sole source of Highlanders for all markets worldwide except China. Chinese-market Highlanders are made in China exclusively for the Chinese market.

== Present automobiles produced ==
- Lexus TX
  (West Plant - 2023–present)
- Toyota Grand Highlander
  (West Plant - 2023–present)
- Toyota Sienna
  (East Plant - 2003–present)

== Planned future production ==
- Scion KEI-01
  (2027–onwards)

== Past automobiles produced ==
- Toyota Tundra (1999–2008), production moved to Toyota Motor Manufacturing Texas
- Toyota Sequoia (2000–2021), production moved to Toyota Motor Manufacturing Texas
- Toyota Highlander (2009–2026), production moved to Toyota Motor Manufacturing Kentucky

== See also ==
- List of Toyota manufacturing facilities
- Toyota Motor Engineering & Manufacturing North America
- Toyota Motor Manufacturing Kentucky
