= Toyota Motor North America =

Subsidiary of Toyota Motor Corporation

- Logo since 2019
- Type: Subsidiary
- Industry: Automotive
- Founded: October 31, 1957; 69 years ago in Hollywood, California
- Headquarters: 6565 Headquarters Drive, Plano, Texas, United States
- Area served: North America
- Key people: Tetsuo “Ted” Ogawa (President, CEO); Mark Templin (COO)
- Products: Toyota and Lexus vehicles sold in North America
- Website: toyota.com/usa

Toyota Motor North America (TMNA) is the operating subsidiary that oversees all operations of the Toyota Motor Corporation in Canada, Mexico, and the United States. Its operations include research and development, manufacturing, sales, marketing, after sales and corporate functions, which are controlled by TMNA but sometimes executed by other subsidiaries and holding companies. The company is headquartered in Plano, Texas, with offices in several locations including Georgetown, Kentucky, Ann Arbor, Michigan, Washington, D.C., and New York City.

Toyota’s operations in North America began on October 31, 1957, and today's Toyota Motor North America was established in 2017 from the consolidation of three companies: Toyota Motor North America, Inc., which controlled Toyota’s corporate functions; Toyota Motor Sales, U.S.A., Inc. which handled marketing, sales, and distribution in the United States; and Toyota Motor Engineering & Manufacturing North America which oversaw operations at all assembly plants in the region. While all three companies continue to exist in legal name, they operate as one company out of one headquarters campus.

== History ==
=== Beginnings in North America (1957–1979) ===
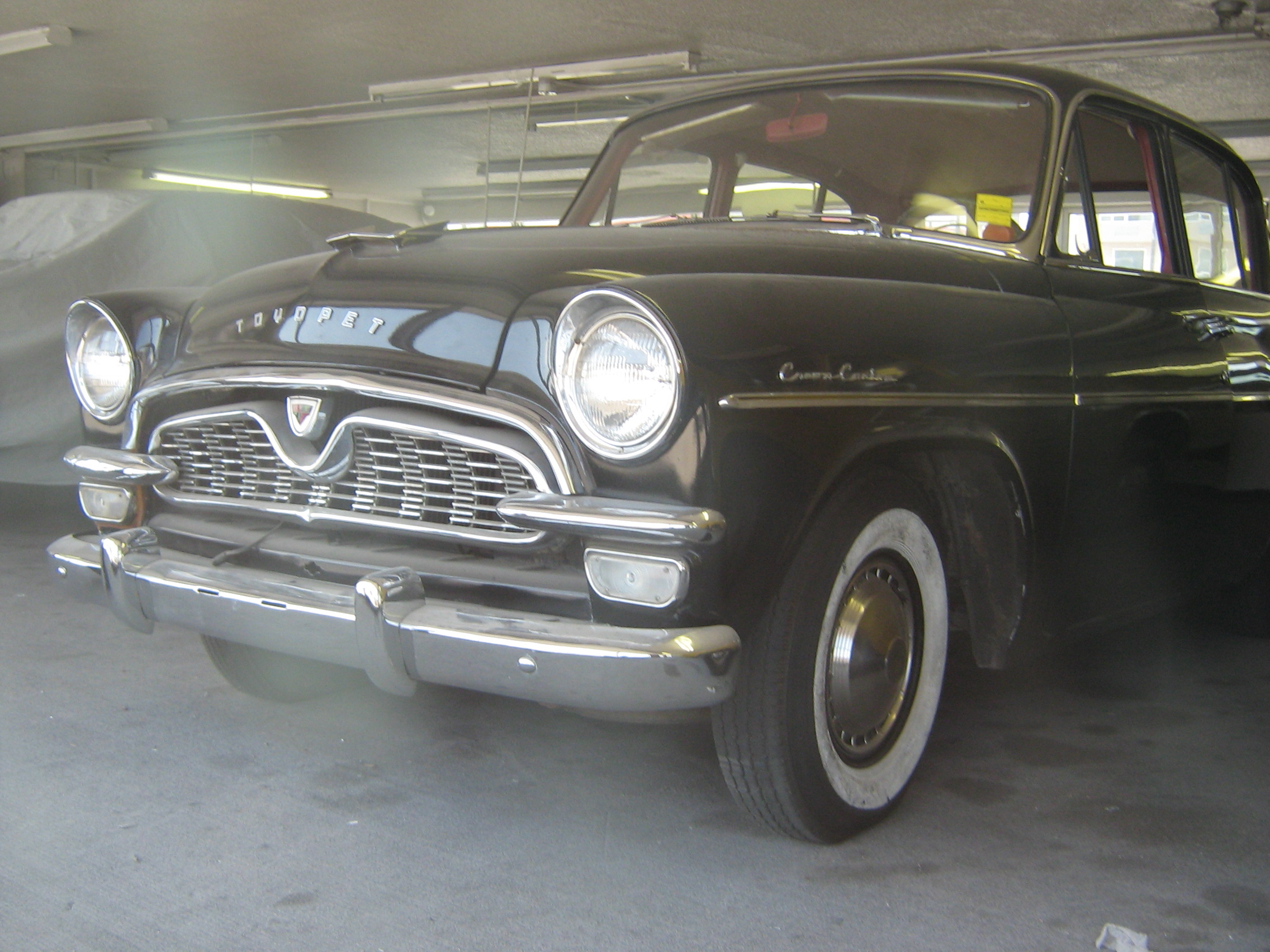
Toyota Toyopet Crown sold in the United States in 1960

In August 1957, Toyota sent three employees to the United States to show off the company's new car, the Toyopet Crown, to car dealers and the media to gauge interest in expanding sales overseas. The vehicle received positive reviews, with media outlets praising the vehicle for having 50% thicker steel than the average American car at the time and the black Deluxe model for being nicely appointed with lots of chrome and luxurious items like a radio, heater and whitewall tires which prompted the press to liken it to a "baby Cadillac". But Toyota knew from testing that the vehicle, designed for the muddy, slow, unpaved roads of Japan, had serious high-speed performance issues. When the Crown was driven on a highway, the engine suddenly began making loud noises and output dropped. But the promising initial showing, along with the strong reputation of the Crown in Japan gave Toyota a false sense of confidence and the company started to pursue exports to the United States.

Toyota’s operations in North America officially began on October 31, 1957 with the establishment of Toyota Motor Sales, U.S.A., Inc. (TMS) which oversaw sales, marketing, and distribution of Toyota’s vehicles in the United States. The fledgling company's headquarters was located in a former Rambler dealership in Hollywood, California with a warehouse near the harbor where vehicles would be imported in Long Beach, California. Sales started on July 10, 1958, and by the end of the year, the company sold 287 Toyopet Crown sedans and one Toyota Land Cruiser.

The company faced problems almost immediately. American automakers saw the increase in sales of imported compact cars and launched several compact cars from the autumn of 1959, including the Chevrolet Corvair, Ford Falcon, and Chrysler Valiant. As a result, sales of imported European cars plunged and the Crown was a flop with buyers finding it underpowered (due to the known high-speed performance issues) and overpriced. In response, exports of the Crown to the United States were suspended in December 1960. However, the Land Cruiser gained a following, allowing the company to make a profit in 1961, but there was not yet a major market for sport-utility vehicles in the United States.

The company's first major success in the United States came in 1965 with the Toyota Corona compact car, which was redesigned specifically for the American market with a more powerful engine, factory-installed air conditioning and an automatic transmission. The Corona helped increase U.S. sales of Toyota vehicles to more than 20,000 units in 1966 (a threefold increase) and helped the company become the third-best-selling import brand in the United States by 1967. In 1968, the Toyota Corolla subcompact car was introduced to the United States and would go on to become the world’s all-time best-selling automobile. This success led Toyota to establish a more permanent presence in North America, opening a headquarters building in Torrance, California, south of Los Angeles in February 1967.

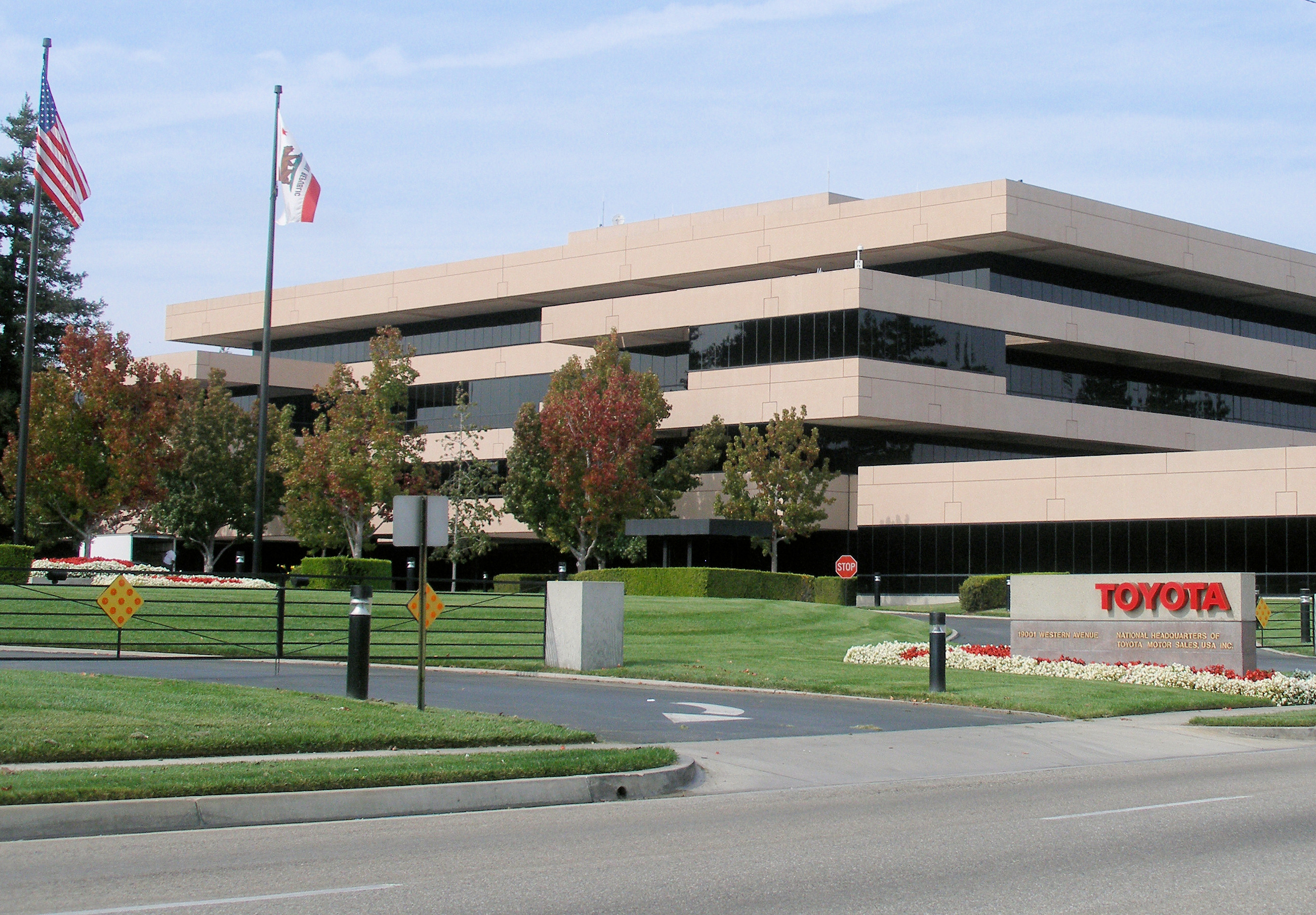
Toyota’s former headquarters complex in Torrance, California

The energy crisis of the 1970s was a major turning point in the American auto industry. Before the crisis, large and heavy vehicles with powerful but inefficient engines were common. But in the years after, consumers started demanding high-quality and fuel-efficient small cars. Domestic automakers, in the midst of their malaise era, struggled to build these cars profitably, but foreign automakers like Toyota were well positioned. This, along with growing anti-Japanese sentiment, prompted the U.S. Congress to consider import restrictions to protect the domestic auto industry.

Toyota’s first manufacturing investment in the United States came in 1972 when the company struck a deal with Atlas Fabricators, to produce truck beds in Long Beach, in an effort to avoid the 25% "chicken tax" on imported light trucks introduced in 1964. By importing the truck as an incomplete chassis cab (the truck without a bed), the vehicle only faced a 4% tariff. Once in the United States, Atlas would build the truck beds and attach them to the trucks. The partnership was successful and two years later, Toyota purchased Atlas (which had been financially struggling) and it would eventually be renamed Toyota Auto Body California (TABC) as part of the company's Toyota Auto Body manufacturing subsidiary.

Toyota also began designing automobiles and conducting research and development in the United States in the 1970s to better understand and reflect the tastes of American consumers. Calty Design Research was established in California in 1973 and Toyota Technical Center, U.S.A. (TTC, later renamed TMNA R&D) was established in 1977 in the town of Ann Arbor, Michigan, not far from Detroit, the center of automobile manufacturing in the United States.

=== Investing in America (1980–1989) ===
After the successes of the 1970s, and the threats of import restrictions, Toyota started making additional investments in the North American market in the 1980s. In 1981, Japan agreed to voluntary export restraints, which limited the number of vehicles the nation would send to the United States each year, leading Toyota to establish assembly plants in North America. The U.S. government also closed the loophole that allowed Toyota to pay lower taxes by building truck beds in America. Despite those challenges, Toyota also expanded its headquarters in Torrance, California into a larger campus of buildings in 1982, as the company marked 25 years in America.

Efforts to open a Toyota assembly plant in the United States started in 1980, with the company proposing a joint-venture with the Ford Motor Company. Those talks broke down in July 1981. Eventually in 1984, the company struck a deal with General Motors (GM) to establish a joint-venture vehicle manufacturing plant called NUMMI (New United Motor Manufacturing, Inc.) in Fremont, California. GM saw the joint venture as a way to get access to a quality small car and an opportunity to learn about the Toyota Production System and The Toyota Way, a series of lean manufacturing and management philosophies. For Toyota, the factory gave the company its first manufacturing base in North America allowing it to avoid any future tariffs on imported vehicles and saw GM as a partner who could show them how to navigate the American labor environment. The first Toyota assembled in America, a white Corolla, rolled off the line at NUMMI on October 7, 1986. In 1991, Toyota started building pickup trucks at NUMMI, allowing the company to completely avoid the chicken tax.

Toyota took the lessons it learned from NUMMI and went onto establish the wholly owned Toyota Motor Manufacturing USA (later renamed Toyota Motor Manufacturing Kentucky) and Toyota Motor Manufacturing Canada plants in 1986. The Kentucky plant was Toyota's largest manufacturing facility in the world, a title it continues to hold and the Canadian operation would later expand to three separate plants that comprise Toyota's second largest manufacturing facility.

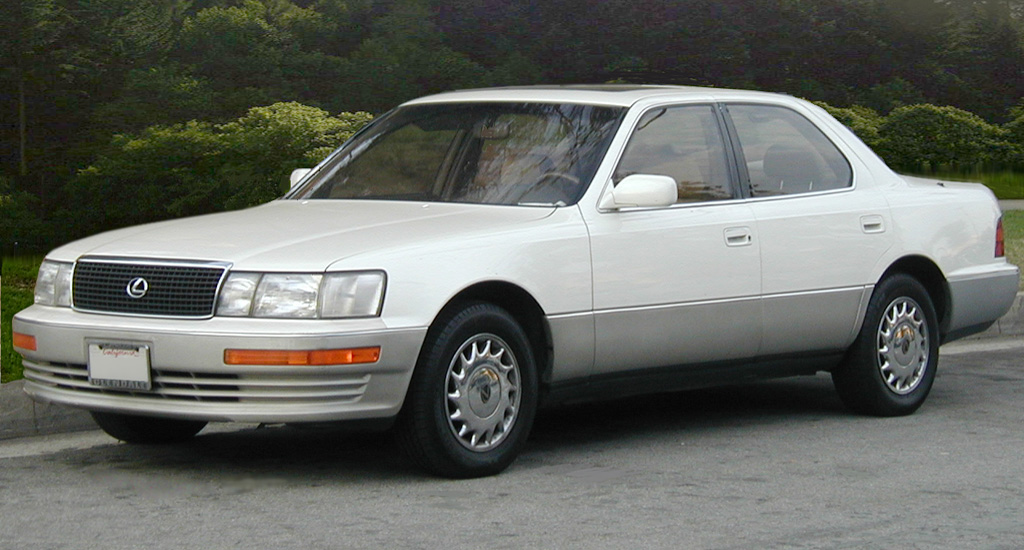
The Lexus LS 400 went on sale in 1989

Before the decade was out, Toyota introduced Lexus, a new division that was formed to market and service luxury vehicles in international markets, including North America. Prior to the debut, Toyota's two existing flagship models, the Crown and Century, both catered exclusively for the Japanese market and had little global appeal that could compete with international luxury brands such as Mercedes-Benz, BMW and Jaguar. The company had been developing the brand and vehicles in secret since August 1983, at a cost of over US$1 billion. The LS 400 flagship full-size sedan debuted in 1989 to strong sales, and was largely responsible for the successful launch of the Lexus marque.

=== Manufacturing expansion (1990–2009) ===
In 1990, Toyota purchased Bodine Aluminum (later renamed Toyota Motor Manufacturing Missouri and Toyota Motor Manufacturing Tennessee) which had three plants in St. Louis and Troy, Missouri, and Jackson, Tennessee to produce cast aluminum engine components for use in other manufacturing facilities.

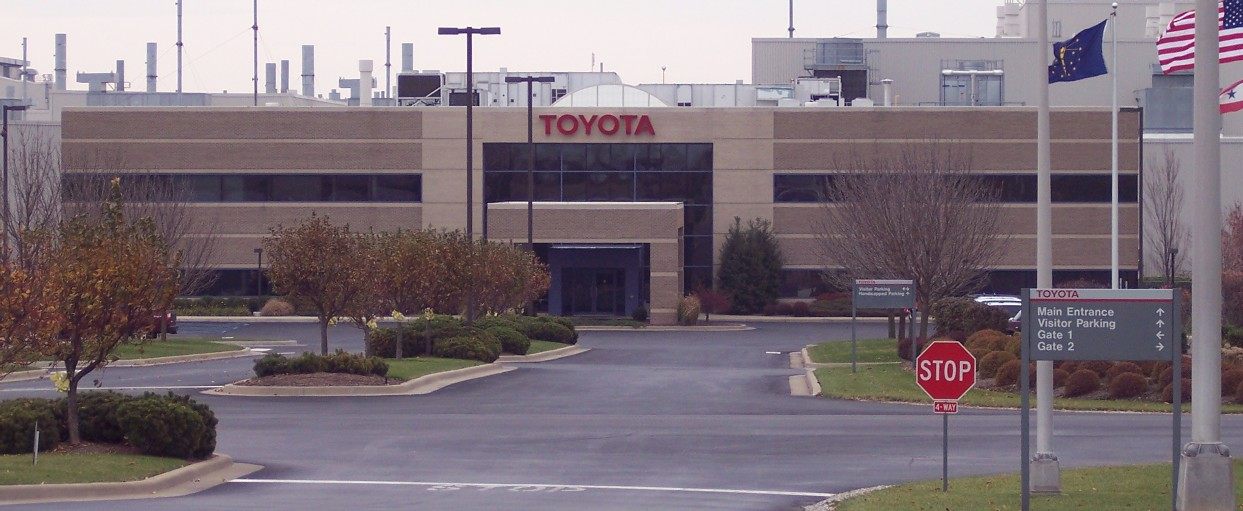
The Toyota Motor Manufacturing Indiana assembly plant which opened in Princeton, Indiana in 1996.

In 1996, the company established two more manufacturing facilities: the Toyota Motor Manufacturing Indiana assembly plant in Princeton, Indiana and the Toyota Motor Manufacturing West Virginia engine and transmission plant in Buffalo, West Virginia. At the same time, the automaker also created the Toyota Motor Manufacturing North America (TMMNA) subsidiary in Erlanger, Kentucky to oversee all Toyota manufacturing operations in North America.

Toyota Motor Manufacturing Alabama, another engine plant was established 2001 in Huntsville, Alabama.

Next, Toyota shifted to expanding its truck producing capacity, building two specialized assembly plants. Toyota Motor Manufacturing de Baja California was established in Tijuana in 2002, becoming the company's first assembly plant in Mexico, which was followed by Toyota Motor Manufacturing Texas in San Antonio in 2003.

TMMNA would merge with the Toyota Technical Center, U.S.A. (TTC) research and development subsidiary in April 2006 to form Toyota Motor Engineering & Manufacturing North America, Inc. (TEMA).

Another assembly plant, Toyota Motor Manufacturing Mississippi was established in Blue Springs, Mississippi in 2007.

=== Toyota in North America today ===
The NUMMI plant was closed in March 2010, after GM pulled out of the joint venture amid a Chapter 11 bankruptcy reorganization. It marked the first time the company had ever closed a factory. The plant was Toyota's only unionized plant in the U.S. and the company said that it was no longer economical to have a plant so far away from the supplier lines it had established in the Midwest.

The current Toyota Motor North America company was established in 2017 as part of the "One Toyota" initiative, TMS and TEMA combined with Toyota Motor North America, Inc. (TMA), which controlled Toyota’s corporate functions, to form Toyota Motor North America. While the three companies continue to exist in legal name, they operate as one company out of one headquarters campus in Plano, Texas. Toyota continues to operate research and design centers in Michigan and in October 2017 opened a new Production Engineering and Manufacturing Center (PEMC) in Georgetown, Kentucky, to serve as the go-between for design and manufacturing.

Toyota opened its second assembly plant in Mexico in 2019, Toyota Motor Manufacturing de Guanajuato located in Apaseo el Grande, which would also specialize in producing pickup trucks.

== Subsidiaries and related operations ==
- Toyota Motor North America, Inc. (TMNA) – Operating subsidiary that oversees all operations of the Toyota Motor Corporation in Canada, Mexico, and the United States. Began operations in 2014 and headquartered in Plano, Texas.
  - Toyota Motor North America, Inc. (TMA NY & DC) – Legal holding company for Toyota's U.S.-based sales and manufacturing operating units. Began operations in 1996, with offices in New York City and Washington, D.C.
  - Toyota Motor Sales, USA, Inc. (TMS USA) – Legal subsidiary for the distribution of new vehicles in the United States through a network of over 1,200 Toyota dealers and over 200 Lexus dealers.
  - Toyota Canada Inc. (51%) – Legal subsidiary for the distribution of new vehicles in Canada through a network of 287 Toyota and Lexus dealers. Established in 1964 and headquartered in Toronto, Ontario. Toyota has 51% ownership and Mitsui & Co. holds the other 49%.
  - Toyota de Puerto Rico, Corp. (TdPR) – Legal subsidiary for the distribution of new vehicles in Puerto Rico through a network of 24 Toyota dealers and two Lexus dealers. Established in 1994 and headquartered in San Juan, Puerto Rico.
  - Toyota Motor Sales de México, S. de R.L. de C.V. (TMEX) – Legal subsidiary for the distribution of new vehicles in Mexico through a network of 68 dealers. Established in 2002 and headquartered in Mexico City, Mexico.
  - Toyota Financial Services – Offers auto sales financing and leasing through subsidiaries Toyota Motor Credit Corporation (USA), Toyota Credit Canada, Inc. and Toyota Financial Services México, S.A. de C.V. (TSM). Headquartered in Plano, Texas, Markham, Ontario and Mexico City, Mexico.
  - Toyota Motor Engineering & Manufacturing North America, Inc. (TEMA) – Legal subsidiary for the engineering and manufacturing of new vehicles in North America. (See tables below for subsidiaries that fall under TEMA.)
  - Toyota Logistics Services, Inc. (TLS) – Subsidiary that handles the logistics of finished vehicles from manufacturing facilities to ports for distribution to dealers or to other countries. TLS also operates an in-house auto trucking company, Toyota Transport, in Arizona, California, and Oregon.
  - Service Parts and Accessories Operations (SPA) – Subsidiary that manages the parts supply chain and distribution network. Headquartered in Torrance, California with an additional redistribution center in Kentucky that supplies parts to 12 regional parts distribution centers.

=== Manufacturing ===
Toyota Motor North America operates several manufacturing facilities in North America through its Toyota Motor Engineering & Manufacturing North America, Inc. (TEMA) subsidiary.

Facility	Location	Established	Products	Employees
Toyota Auto Body California	Long Beach, California	1972	Produces automotive parts	293
Toyota Motor Manufacturing Kentucky	Georgetown, Kentucky	1986	Assembles Camry and RAV4, and produces engines	7,800
Toyota Motor Manufacturing Canada	Cambridge, Ontario and Woodstock, Ontario, Canada	1986	Assembles RAV4, Lexus RX and Lexus NX	9,700
Toyota Motor Manufacturing Missouri	Troy, Missouri	1990	Produces aluminum cylinder heads	900
Toyota Motor Manufacturing Indiana	Princeton, Indiana	1996	Assembles Highlander, Grand Highlander, Sienna and Lexus TX	7,222
Toyota Motor Manufacturing West Virginia	Buffalo, West Virginia	1996	Produces engines and transmissions	1,479
Toyota Motor Manufacturing Alabama	Huntsville, Alabama	2001	Produces engines	1,150
Toyota Motor Manufacturing de Baja California	Tijuana, Baja California, Mexico	2002	Assembles Tacoma and produces truck beds	1,882
Toyota Motor Manufacturing Tennessee	Jackson, Tennessee	2003	Produces aluminum engine blocks	400
Toyota Motor Manufacturing Texas	San Antonio, Texas	2003	Assembles Sequoia and Tundra	2,660
Toyota Motor Manufacturing Mississippi	Blue Springs, Mississippi	2007	Assembles Corolla	1,824
Toyota Motor Manufacturing de Guanajuato	Apaseo el Grande, Guanajuato, Mexico	2019	Assembles Tacoma	1,764
Mazda Toyota Manufacturing USA (50% joint venture with Mazda)	Huntsville, Alabama	2021	Assembles Corolla Cross and Mazda CX-50	4,000
Toyota Battery Manufacturing North Carolina	Liberty, North Carolina	2025	Battery packs for electric vehicles	3,000
	References:			

=== Engineering, research and development ===
- Calty Design Research – Design studio established in 1973 with facilities in Newport Beach, California, Ann Arbor, Michigan and San Francisco (Toyota Innovation Hub) that provides interior and exterior styling proposals for future Toyota vehicles.
- Toyota Canada Cold Research Centre – Test facility located in Timmins, Ontario. Toyota’s first cold-weather facility outside of Japan, tests the operation of Toyota global products in sub-zero conditions
- Toyota Motor North America, Research and Development (TMNA R&D) – Research and development unit established in 1977 headquartered Saline, Michigan with locations in Ann Arbor, Michigan, Gardena, California and a proving grounds in Arizona that conducts engineering design, prototype building, and testing of vehicles, parts and materials for Toyota's North American vehicles.
- Toyota Racing Development U.S.A. (TRD U.S.A.) – Automotive racing design, development and manufacturing unit established in 1979 and headquartered in Costa Mesa, California with NASCAR support operation in Salisbury, North Carolina.
- Toyota Info Technology Center, U.S.A. – Technology research and development unit established in 2001 headquartered Mountain View, California with a branch office in New York that evaluates and develops new in-car technology.

== Products ==
In North America, Toyota sells a wide range of vehicles, including sedans, pickup trucks, a minivan, sport utility vehicles, and crossover SUVs.

=== Current Toyota products ===
Model	Class	Propulsion	Final assembly location
4Runner	Mid-size SUV	Gasoline Hybrid	Aichi, Japan (Tahara)
bZ	Compact crossover SUV	Electric	Aichi, Japan (Motomachi)
bZ Woodland	Mid-size crossover SUV	Electric	Gunma, Japan (Subaru)
Camry	Mid-size sedan	Hybrid	Kentucky, U.S. (TMMK)
C-HR	Compact crossover SUV	Electric	Aichi, Japan (Takaoka)
Corolla	Compact sedan	Gasoline	Mississippi, U.S. (TMMMS)
Corolla	Compact sedan	Gasoline	Aichi, Japan (Takaoka and Tsutsumi)
Corolla	Compact sedan	Hybrid	Aichi, Japan (Takaoka and Tsutsumi)
Corolla	Compact hatchback	Gasoline	Aichi, Japan (Takaoka and Tsutsumi)
Corolla Cross	Compact crossover SUV	Gasoline Hybrid	Alabama, U.S. (MTMUS)
Crown	Full-size sedan	Hybrid	Aichi, Japan (Motomachi and Tsutsumi)
Crown Signia	Mid-size crossover SUV	Hybrid	Aichi, Japan (Motomachi and Tsutsumi)
Grand Highlander	Full-size crossover SUV	Gasoline Hybrid	Indiana, U.S. (TMMI)
GR 86	Sports coupe	Gasoline	Gunma, Japan (Subaru)
GR Corolla	Sports hatchback	Gasoline	Aichi, Japan (Motomachi); England, U.K. (TMUK)
Highlander	Mid-size crossover SUV	Gasoline Hybrid	Indiana, U.S. (TMMI)
Highlander EV	Mid-size crossover SUV	Electric	Kentucky, U.S. (TMMK)
Land Cruiser	Mid-size SUV	Hybrid	Aichi, Japan (Tahara) Tokyo, Japan (Hino)
Mirai	Mid-size sedan	Hydrogen fuel cell	Aichi, Japan (Motomachi)
Prius	Compact hatchback	Hybrid	Aichi, Japan (Tsutsumi)
Prius Plug-in Hybrid	Compact hatchback	Plug-in hybrid	Aichi, Japan (Tsutsumi)
RAV4	Compact crossover SUV	Gasoline Hybrid	Ontario, Canada (TMMC) Kentucky, U.S. (TMMK)
RAV4 Plug-in Hybrid	Compact crossover SUV	Plug-in hybrid	Aichi, Japan (Takaoka)
Sequoia	Full-size SUV	Hybrid	Texas, U.S. (TMMTX)
Sienna	Minivan	Hybrid	Indiana, U.S. (TMMI)
Tacoma	Mid-size pickup truck	Gasoline Hybrid	Baja California, Mexico (TMMBC) Guanajuato, Mexico (TMMGT)
Tundra	Full-size pickup truck	Gasoline Hybrid	Texas, U.S. (TMMTX)

=== Current Lexus products ===
Model	Class	Propulsion	Final assembly location
ES	Mid-size sedan	Hybrid	Fukuoka, Japan (TMK)
GX	Full-size SUV	Gasoline Hybrid	Aichi, Japan (Tahara)
IS	Compact sedan	Gasoline	Aichi, Japan (Tahara)
LC	Sports car	Gasoline Hybrid	Aichi, Japan (Motomachi)
LS	Full-size sedan	Gasoline Hybrid	Aichi, Japan (Tahara)
LX	Full-size SUV	Gasoline	Aichi, Japan (Yoshiwara)
NX	Compact crossover SUV	Gasoline Hybrid; Plug-in hybrid	Fukuoka, Japan (TMK) Ontario, Canada (TMMC)
RC	Compact coupe	Gasoline	Aichi, Japan (Tahara)
RX	Mid-size crossover SUV	Gasoline Hybrid; Plug-in hybrid	Fukuoka, Japan (TMK) Ontario, Canada (TMMC)
RZ	Compact crossover SUV	Battery electric	Aichi, Japan (Motomachi)
TX	Full-size crossover SUV	Gasoline Hybrid; Plug-in hybrid	Indiana, U.S. (TMMI)
TZ	Mid-size crossover SUV	Electric	Fukuoka, Japan (TMK) Kentucky, U.S. (TMMK)
UX	Subcompact crossover SUV	Gasoline Hybrid	Fukuoka, Japan (TMK)

=== Current Scion products ===
Model	Class	Propulsion	Final assembly location
KEI-01	Low Speed Vehicle	Gasoline	Indiana, U.S. (TMMI)
