= TABC =

TABC can refer to:

- Texas Alcoholic Beverage Commission
- TABC, Inc., a Toyota Motor Company factory in Long Beach, California
- Torah Academy of Bergen County, a school in Teaneck, New Jersey
- Transatlantic Business Council, a business advocacy group on transatlantic trade
