= Toyota Venza =

Mid-size crossover SUV

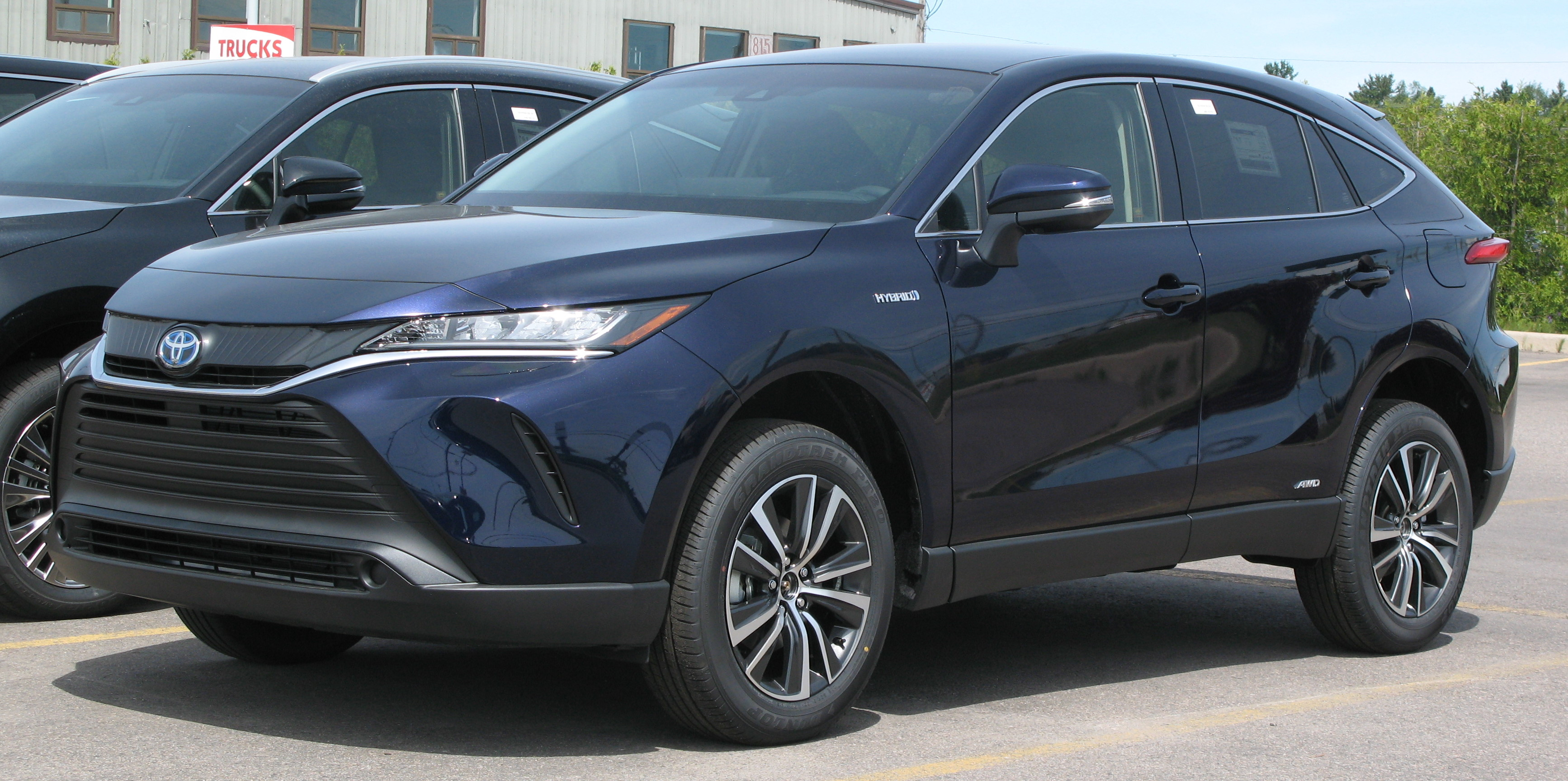
- 2021 Toyota Venza LE (Canada)

Overview
- Manufacturer: Toyota
- Production: 2008–2017; 2020–2026

Body and chassis
- Class: Mid-size crossover SUV
- Body style: 5-door SUV
- Layout: Front-engine, front-wheel-drive; Front-engine, all-wheel-drive

Chronology
- Successor: Toyota Crown Signia (North America)

The Toyota Venza is a five-passenger mid-size crossover SUV manufactured and marketed by Toyota primarily for the North American market, with two generations separated by a hiatus from model years 2018–2020.

The first-generation Venza was based on the XV40 series Camry platform and marketed between 2008 and 2017 — and shared the platform with the AL10 series Lexus RX. The second-generation model is a rebadged Japanese-market XU80 series Harrier and has been sold since September 2020.

The name "Venza" is a mix of "Venture" and "Monza."

== First generation (AV10; 2008) ==
First generation
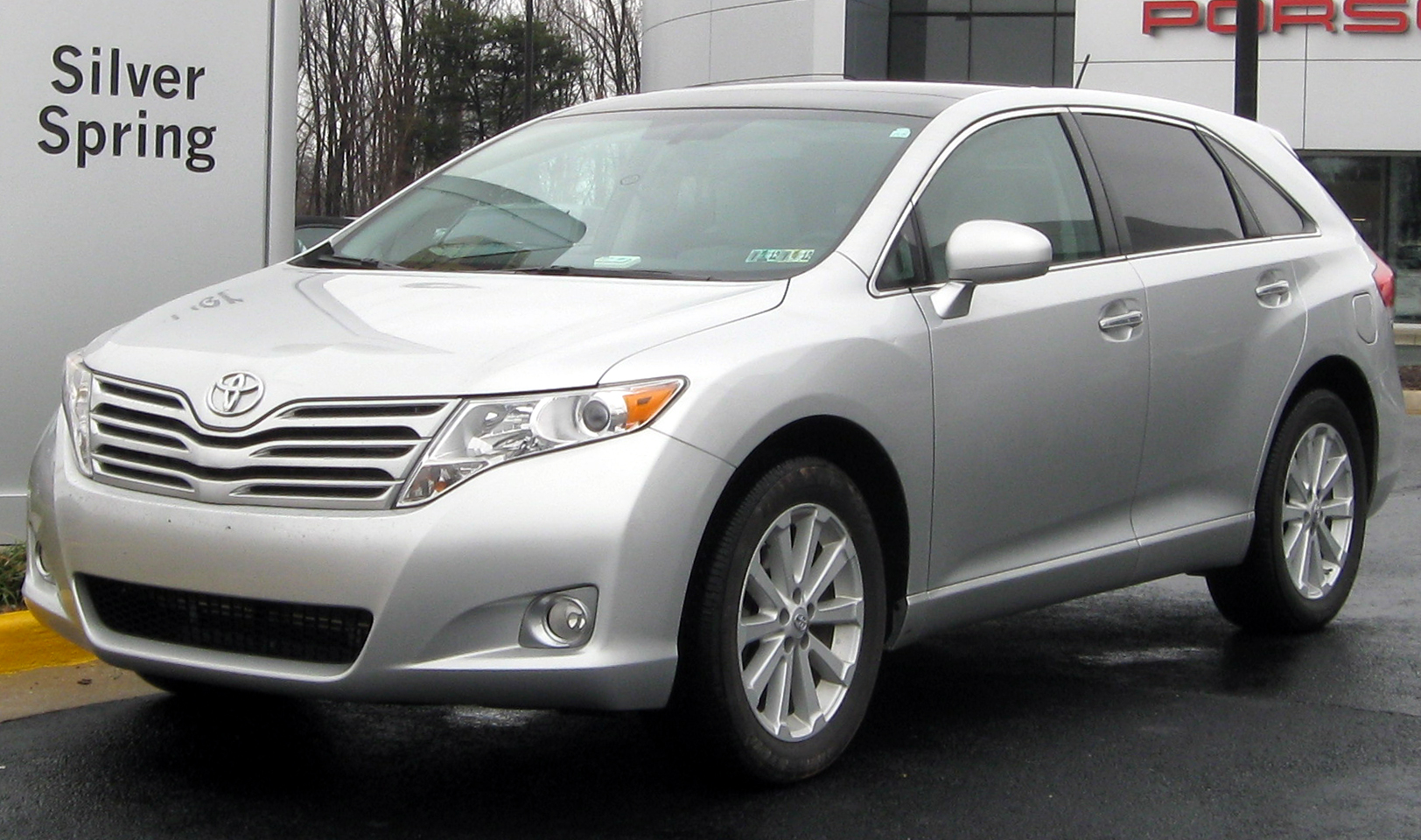

Overview
- Model code: AV10
- Production: November 2008 – 2017
- Model years: 2009–2015
- Assembly: United States: Georgetown, Kentucky (TMMK)
- Designer: Tatsuya Sonoda, Chung Lee, Scott Roller and Ian Cartabiano

Body and chassis
- Platform: Toyota K platform
- Related: Lexus RX (AL10); Toyota Camry/Aurion (XV40); Toyota Highlander/Kluger (XU40)

Powertrain
- Engine: Gasoline: 2.7 L 1AR-FE I4 (AGV10/15); 3.5 L 2GR-FE V6 (GGV10/15)
- Power output: 181–182 hp (135–136 kW; 184–185 PS) (1AR-FE); 268 hp (200 kW; 272 PS) (2GR-FE)
- Transmission: 6-speed automatic

Dimensions
- Wheelbase: 109.3 in (2,775 mm)
- Length: 189.0 in (4,800 mm)
- Width: 75.0 in (1,905 mm)
- Height: 63.4 in (1,610 mm)
- Curb weight: 4,045 lb (1,835 kg)

The first-generation Venza was unveiled at the 2008 North American International Auto Show in Detroit. It was designed at the Calty Design studios in Newport Beach, California, based on the FT-SX concept car and primarily engineered at Toyota Technical Center in Ann Arbor, Michigan. Venza's production began at Toyota Motor Manufacturing Kentucky (TMMK) in Georgetown, Kentucky in November 2008. The 2.7 L model was launched in February 2009.

The first-generation Venza is based on the XV40 series Camry chassis (K platform) and is similar to the Mark X ZiO in concept. It was powered by either a 2.7 L 1AR-FE four-cylinder engine or a 3.5 L 2GR-FE V6 engine, both mated to a 6-speed automatic transmission. The Venza was available in front-wheel drive or all-wheel drive. The US Environmental Protection Agency estimated fuel economy of 21 mpg_{‑US} (8.9 km/L; 25 mpg_{‑imp}) in the city and 29 mpg_{‑US} (12 km/L; 35 mpg_{‑imp}) in the highway with the 2.7 L engine.

=== Features ===
The Venza had a single trim level, with numerous packages and options. Standard features include fog lamps, 19-inch alloy wheels (2.7 L), 20-inch alloy wheels (3.5 L), HomeLink, XM satellite radio, 6-disc CD changer, dual-zone climate control, electrochromic auto-dimming rear-view mirror, 8-way power drivers seat, steering-wheel mounted audio controls, Hill-Start assist control and the Toyota Star Safety System.

Options include automatic high beams with HID lighting, heated side view mirrors, power liftgate, leather seat surfaces, 4-way power passenger seat, panoramic glass moonroof, smart key system, 13-speaker JBL sound system with Bluetooth, voice-activated touch-screen DVD navigation system, backup camera and a rear DVD entertainment system with a 9-inch display and two wireless headphones. The Touring Package, which included HID headlights, push button start, Navigation, and the JBL Sound Package, was only available for the 3.5-liter all-wheel drive configuration. The Premium Package, which contained the moonroof and backup camera, was available for all but the 2.7-liter front-wheel drive configuration. The leather package was available for all models.

For 2010, the Venza received a standard USB audio input and Bluetooth hands-free phone capability. Due to this addition, a single-CD player unit replaced the previously standard in-dash 6-disc CD changer.

For 2012, the Venza featured LE, XLE and Limited trim levels for the US market, replacing the single-grade line with various option packages. The LE and XLE trims were available with all powertrain combinations: 2.7-liter, 3.5-liter, front-wheel drive or all-wheel drive; the Venza Limited comes with the 3.5-liter engine only, in front-wheel drive or all-wheel drive configurations. Canadian models retained the single trim level, adding only a Convenience Package for the 2.7-liter all-wheel drive trim.

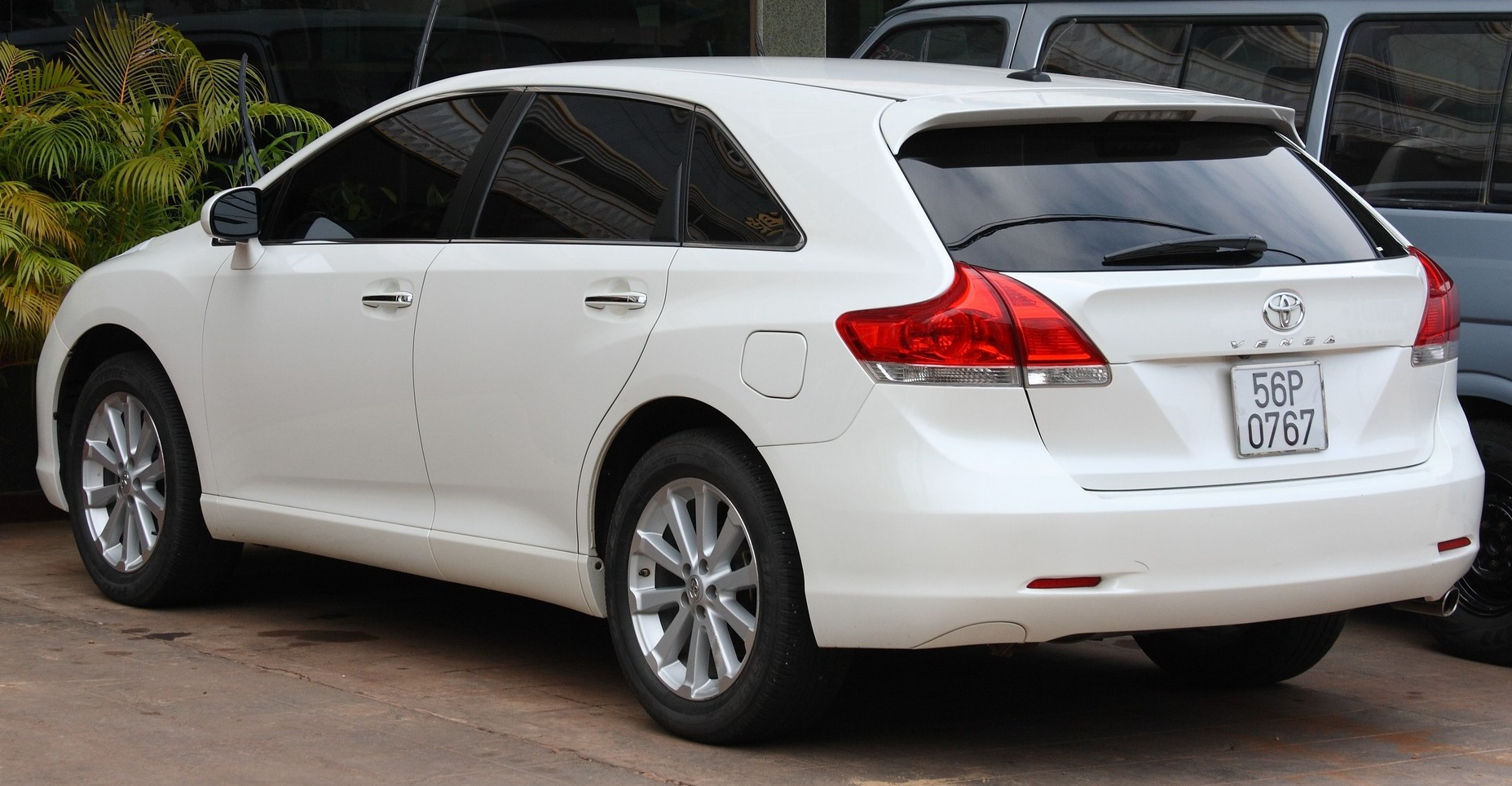
Rear view

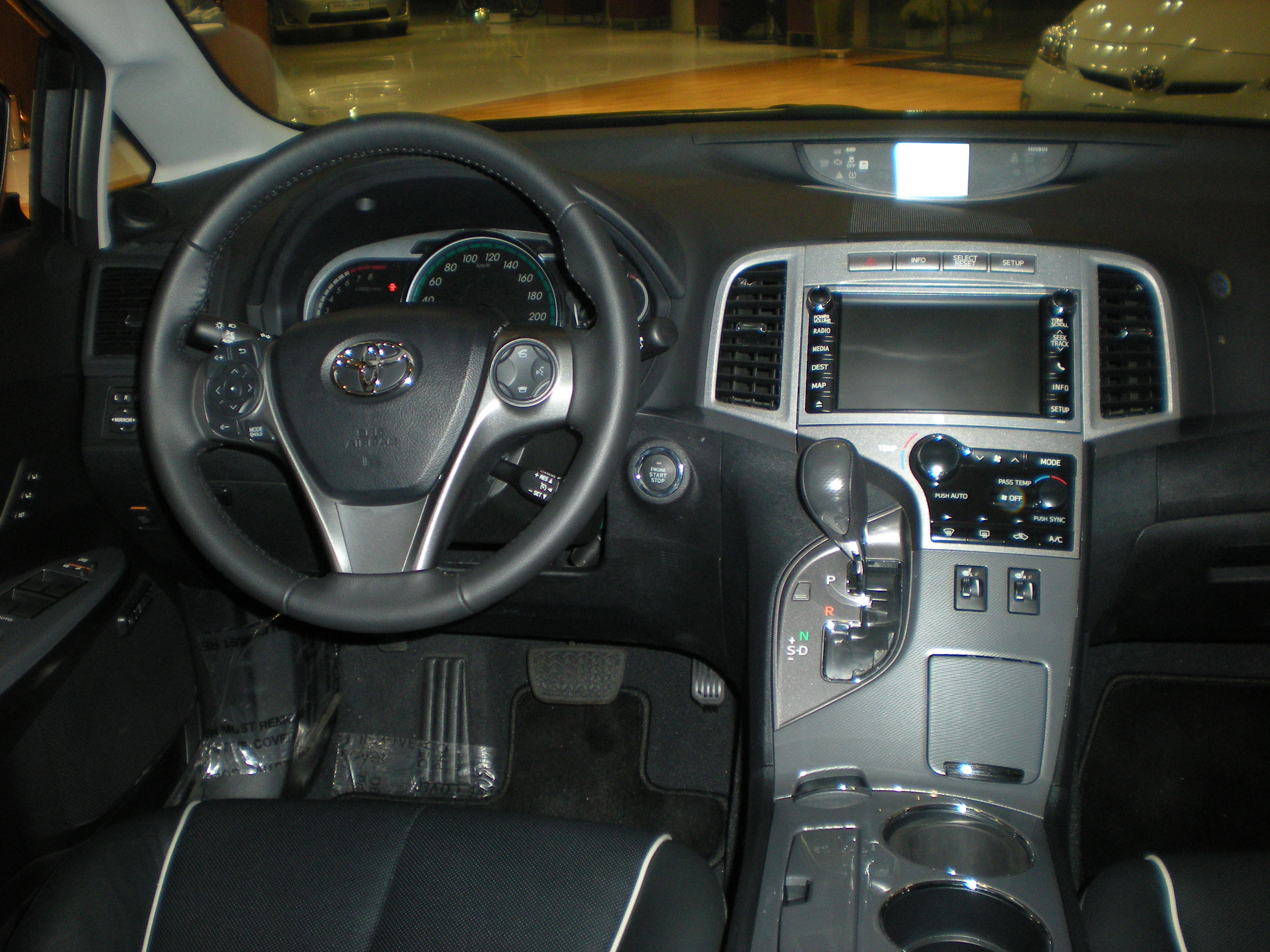
Interior

=== 2012 facelift ===
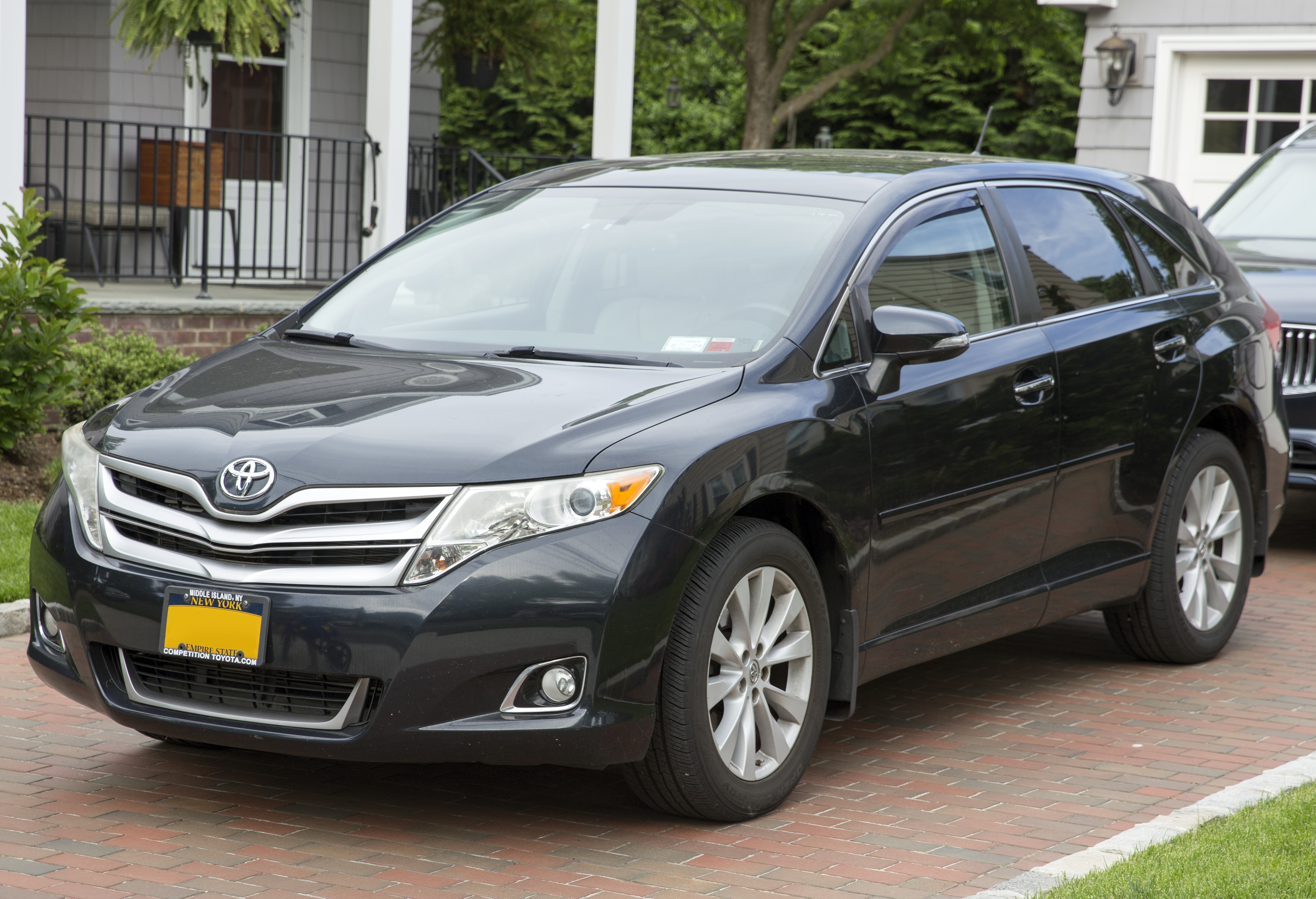
Front view

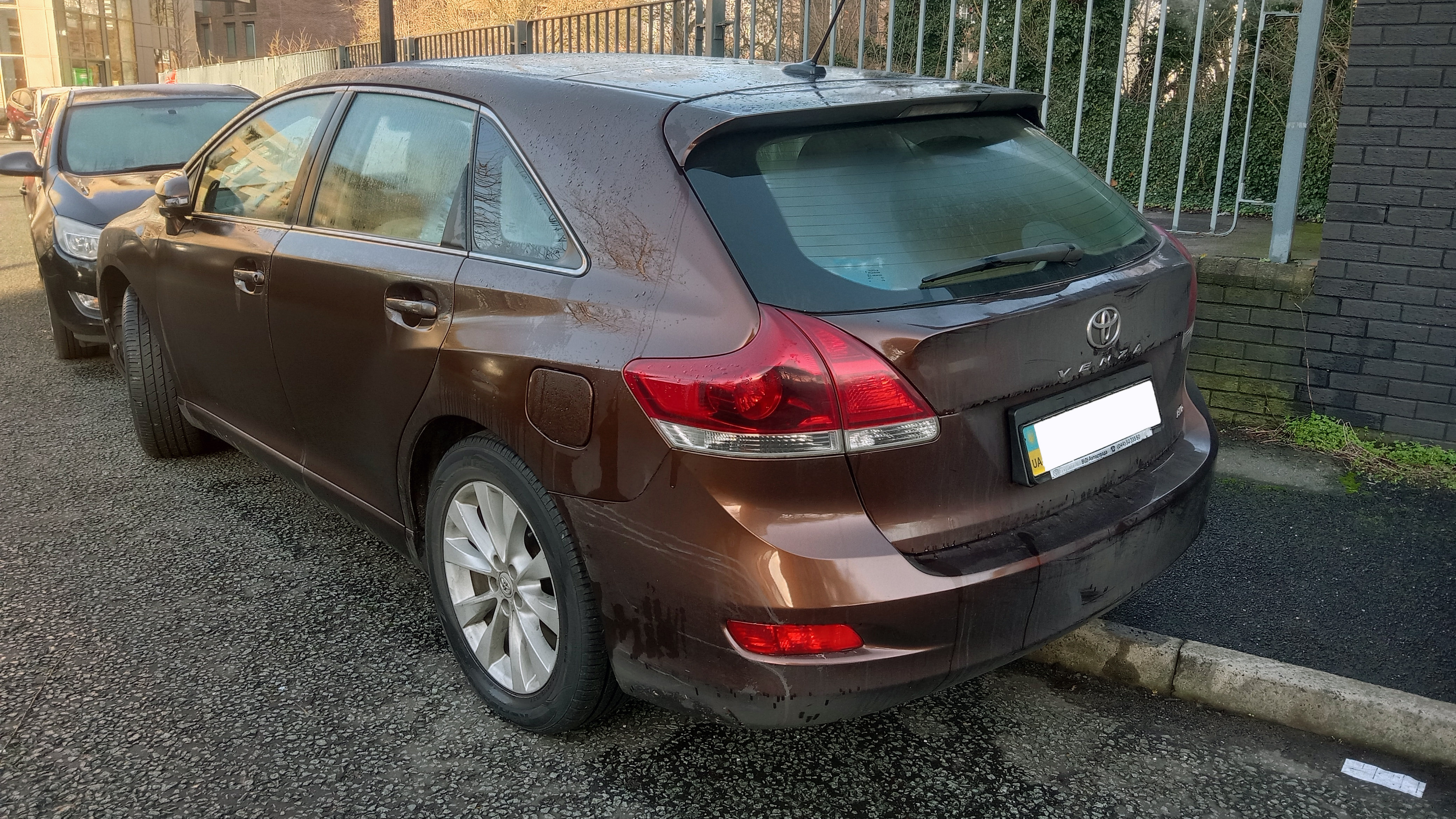
Rear view

In 2012, for the 2013 model year, the Venza received a mid-cycle facelift. It was presented at the New York International Auto Show in April 2012 and went on sale during May 2012. 2.7 L models receive restyled 19-inch alloy wheels. The 2013 model also added an integrated multimedia navigation and telematics system, marketed as Toyota Entune.

=== Engines ===
Gasoline
Chassis code	Model	Engine	Transmission	Power	Torque
AGV10 (FWD); AGV15 (4WD)	2.7 L I4	2,672 cc 1AR-FE DOHC 16-valve EFI straight-four with Dual VVT-i	6-speed automatic	181–182 hp (135–136 kW; 184–185 PS) at 5,800 rpm	182 lb⋅ft (247 N⋅m) at 4,200 rpm
GGV10 (FWD); GGV15 (4WD)	3.5 L V6	3,456 cc 2GR-FE DOHC 24-valve EFI V6 with Dual VVT-i	6-speed automatic	268 hp (200 kW; 272 PS) at 6,200 rpm	246–248 lb⋅ft (334–336 N⋅m) at 4,700 rpm

=== Safety ===
The Venza was equipped with vehicle stability control, traction control system, electronic brakeforce distribution, emergency brake assist, anti-lock braking system, smart stop technology as well as hill-start assist control, tire-pressure monitoring system, active head restraints for front-seat occupants, 3-point seat belts and headrests for all seats, emergency locking retractors (ELR) for all seats, automatic locking retractors (ATR) for all seats (except driver's), front seatbelt pretensioners with force limiters. LATCH (Lower Anchors and Tethers for Children) for rear outboard seats and seven standard airbags, including dual-stage front airbags, driver's knee airbag, front seat-mounted side airbags, 2-row side curtain airbags and fuel pump cut-off switch with airbag deployment. The rear bumper system was awarded Toyota's top honor for innovation, and safety.

Some Venza owners have reported a safety concern because the sun visor can suddenly sag and obscure the driver's vision while driving. More than 20 visibility-related complaints were filed against the 2009 Venza with the National Highway Traffic Safety Administration.The visor must be replaced once this occurs. An online petition was created to encourage Toyota to issue a safety recall due to the failing sun visors.

==== Crash testing ====
National Highway Traffic Safety Administration crash test ratings (2009):
Frontal Driver:	5/5 stars
Frontal Passenger:	5/5 stars
Side Driver:	5/5 stars
Side Rear Passenger:	5/5 stars
Rollover:	4/5 stars

The Insurance Institute for Highway Safety gave the Venza its Top Safety Pick rating in 2009. The Venza is also rated "Good" in the roof strength test, as a result the Venza also received the Insurance Institute for Highway Safety Top Safety Pick in 2010 and 2011 when roof strength became a criterion for receiving the award.

=== Production ===
The first-generation Venza began production at Toyota Motor Manufacturing Kentucky (TMMK) on November 11, 2008, with over 70 percent of the Venza's components coming from US suppliers. Toyota projected sales of between 75,000 and 100,000 units of Venza per year. The first-generation Venza was one of the two North American built Toyota automobiles (alongside the Avalon) not to be sold in Mexico.

TMMK stopped production of the Venza in the American market in June 2015. Production of the vehicle remained there for export until 2017.

=== Marketing ===
During the 2008 vehicle launch, Toyota marketed Venza under the campaign "You're More than One Thing. So is Venza".

In Canada, the Venza was featured as a prize in the 2009 Tim Hortons "Rrroll up the rim to win" promotion.

In 2013, the Venza debuted in Russian and Chinese markets.

==== Classification ====
Determining whether the Venza is a crossover SUV or wagon isn't clear; some journalists regard it as the "Camry station wagon" (the successor to the 1991-1996 Camry wagon which was the last iteration to offer this style in Canada and the US) while other sources often describe it simply as new type of "crossover". Toyota states the Venza blends the "styling and comfort of a passenger car with the flexibility of a sport utility vehicle". According to Toyota, Venza is neither a station wagon nor SUV, rather it is targeted at customers who want more room and flexibility than the Camry sedan but desire a smaller size than the Highlander, a three-row mid-size crossover SUV. Toyota lists the Venza's competitors as the Honda Accord and Nissan Altima on their website's comparison page, both being popular mid-size sedans. The Globe and Mail has cross-shopped the Venza with the Honda Crosstour and Subaru Outback, the latter two being crossover wagon derivatives of the Honda Accord and Subaru Legacy mid-size sedans.Motor Trend has regarded the crossover SUVs Ford Edge and Nissan Murano as direct competitors to the Venza. Meanwhile, the United States Environmental Protection Agency (EPA) classified the Venza as a sport utility vehicle.

Toyota told automotive magazine Motor Trend that it forwent entering the Venza in the publication's SUV of the Year competition. Toyota requested that the Venza compete in the Car of the Year competition. Motor Trend decided that the Venza should not compete in any competition at all since its ride height is too high to be qualified as a car.

=== Discontinuation ===
In 2015, Toyota announced that the first-generation Venza would be discontinued after the 2015 model year, citing three factors contributing to the decision: customer preference, competitiveness within the segment and deteriorating sales. Production of US models ended in June 2015 and export models ended production in 2017.

Another possible factor was increased competition from Toyota's own offerings, as the upcoming fifth generation RAV4 was significantly enlarged which would have competitive with the outgoing Venza in terms of interior space, the former also being produced on a new platform for hybrid and plug-in hybrid powertrains.

== Second generation (XU80; 2020) ==
Second generation
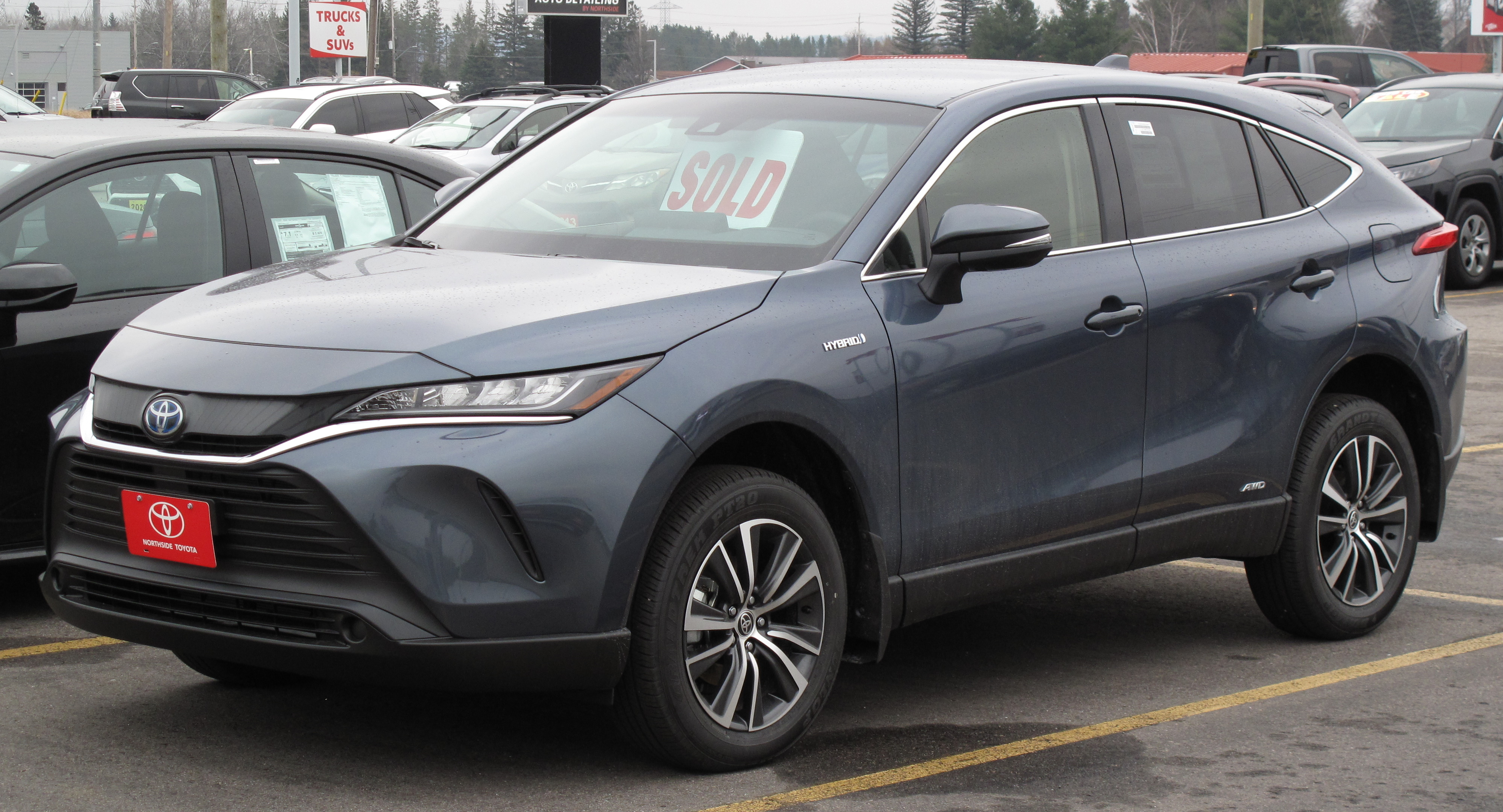
- 2021 Venza LE (Canada)

Overview
- Model code: XU80
- Also called: Toyota Harrier
- Production: 2020–2024 (Japan); 2021–2026 (China)
- Model years: 2021–2024
- Assembly: Japan: Toyota City, Aichi (Takaoka plant); China: Guangzhou (GAC Toyota)
- Designer: Nobuhiko Honda, Pansoo Kwon, Hideo Koyama and Daisuke Iguchi

Body and chassis
- Platform: TNGA: GA-K
- Related: Toyota RAV4 (XA50); Lexus NX (AZ20)

Powertrain
- Engine: Gasoline: 2.0 L M20C-FKS I4 (China); Gasoline hybrid: 2.5 L A25A-FXS I4 (AXUH85); 2.5 L A25D-FXS I4 (China)
- Electric motor: 118 hp (88 kW; 120 PS) 3NM synchronous (front, hybrid); 54 hp (40 kW; 55 PS) 4NM synchronous (rear, hybrid)
- Power output: 169 hp (126 kW; 171 PS) (M20D-FKS); 176 hp (131 kW; 178 PS) (A25A-FXS, gasoline engine); 215–219 hp (160–163 kW; 218–222 PS) (A25A-FXS, combined system output)
- Transmission: K120 CVT with physical first gear (gasoline); eCVT (hybrid)
- Hybrid drivetrain: Power-split
- Battery: 0.9 kWh Lithium-ion (hybrid)

Dimensions
- Wheelbase: 105.9 in (2,690 mm)
- Length: 186.6 in (4,740 mm)
- Width: 73.0 in (1,855 mm)
- Height: 65.9 in (1,675 mm)
- Curb weight: 3,847 lb (1,745 kg)

Chronology
- Successor: Toyota Crown Signia (North America)

The second-generation Venza is a rebadged Japanese-market XU80 series Harrier, released for the North American market for the 2021 model year. It was initially planned to be revealed at the April 2020 New York International Auto Show but it was instead unveiled online in North America on May 18, 2020. Unlike the Harrier, the Venza for this market is only available with an all-wheel drive hybrid powertrain, bringing an improved 40 mpg_{‑US} (6 L/100 km; 48 mpg_{‑imp}) to try to bring it to the top tier of the SUV market regarding fuel efficiency. While the first-generation model was produced in the US, the North American second-generation model is produced in Japan.

The second-generation Venza is also sold in China by GAC Toyota and produced at the Guangzhou factory, with alterations on the front fascia.

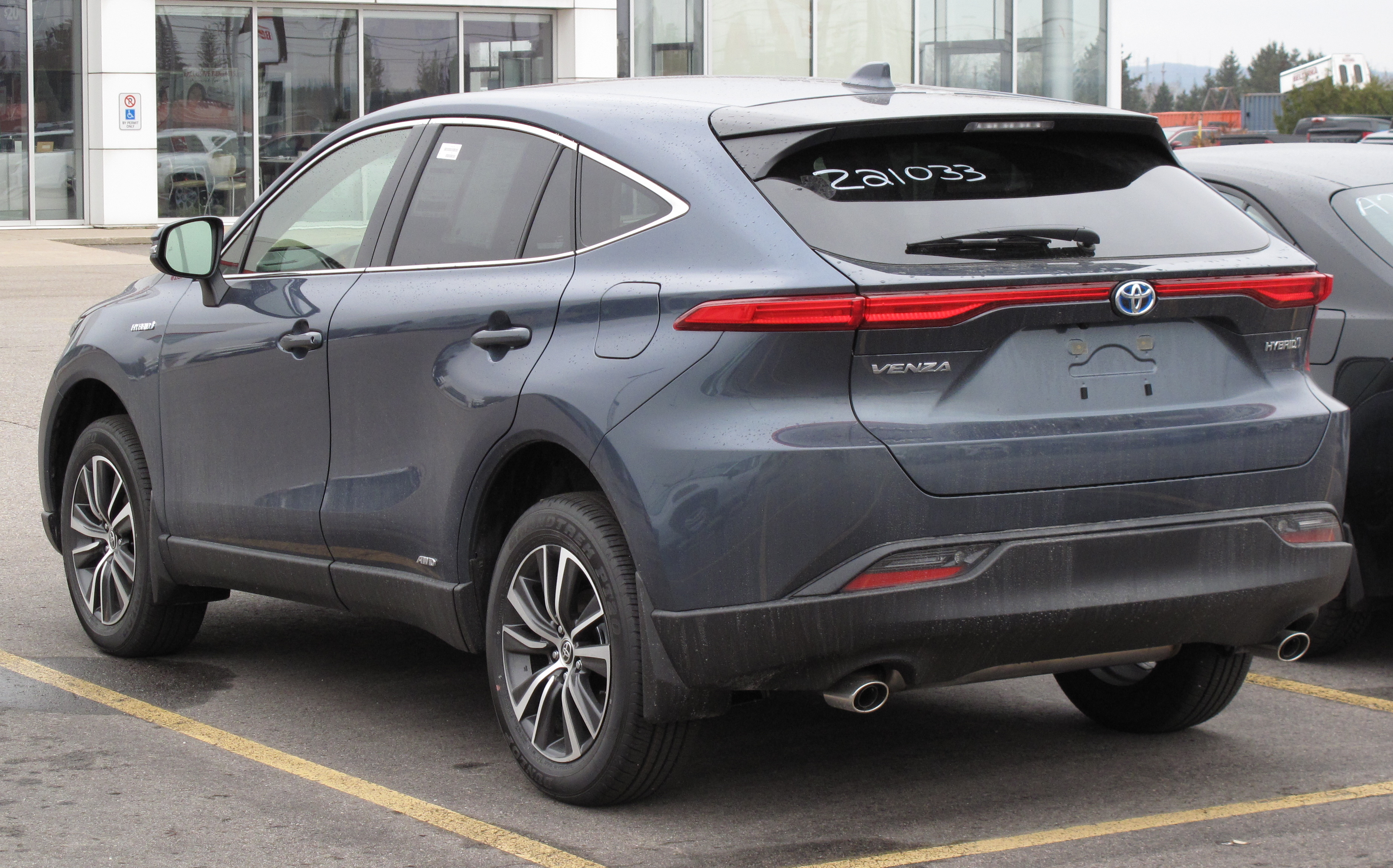
Rear view

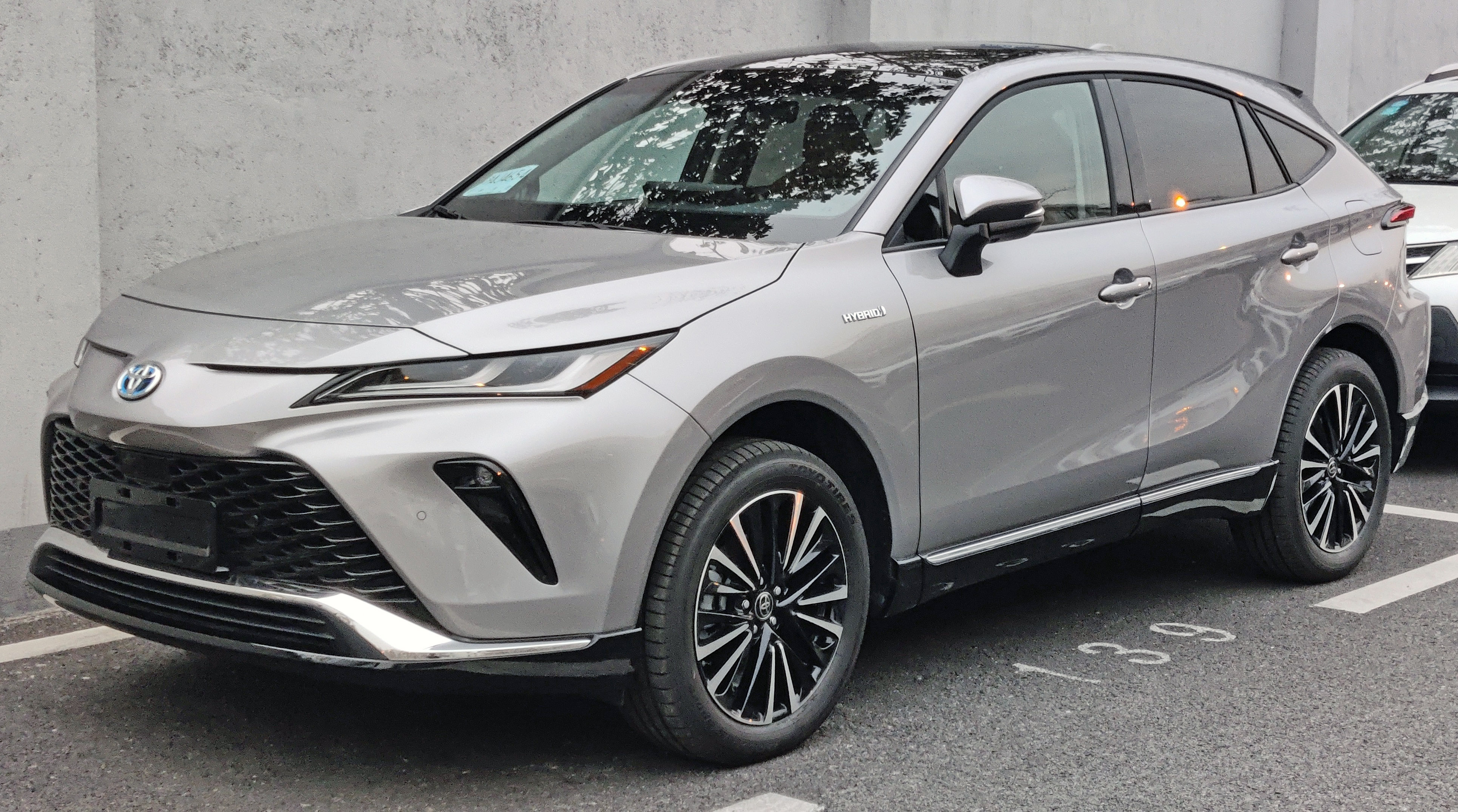
Chinese-market Venza

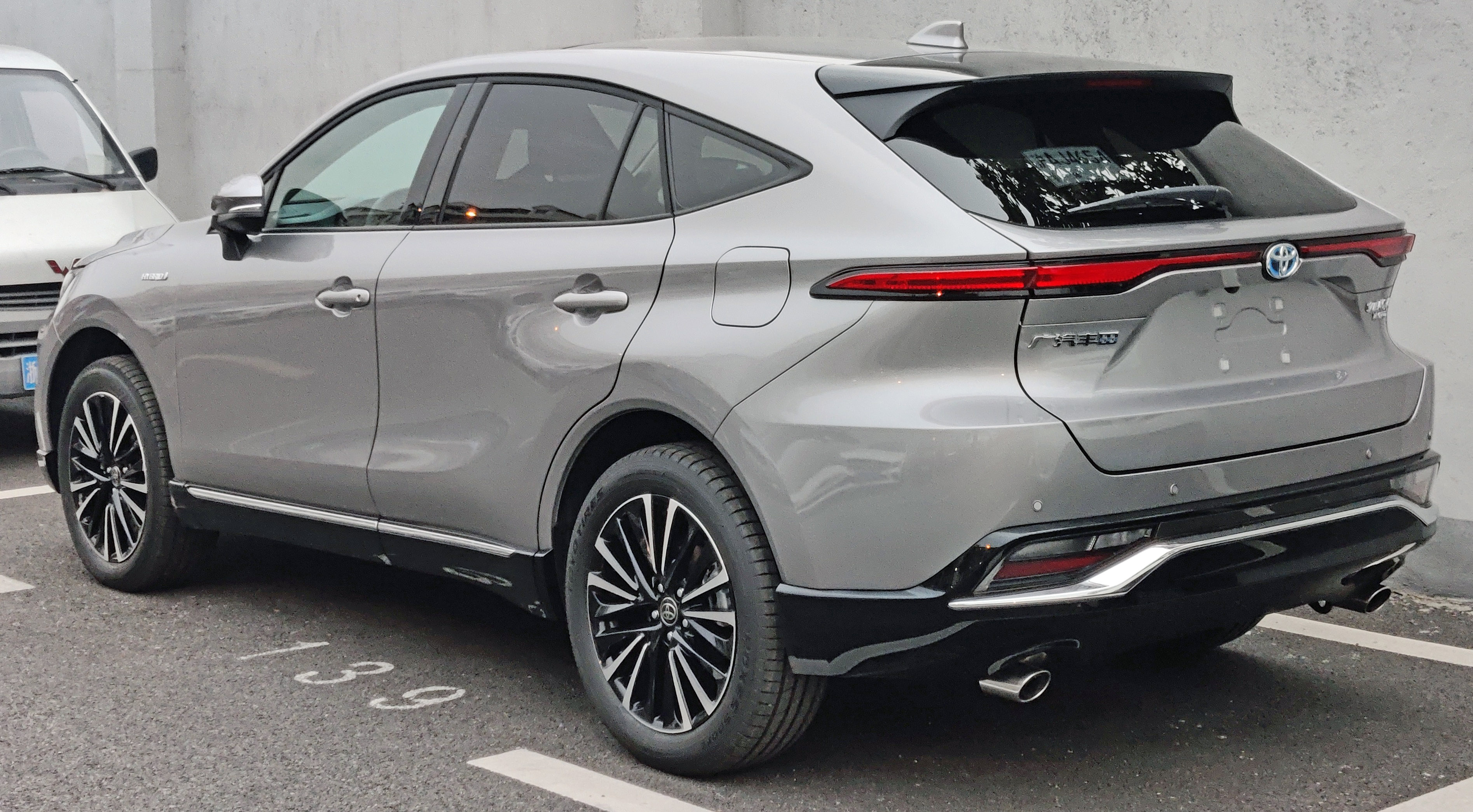
Chinese-market Venza rear

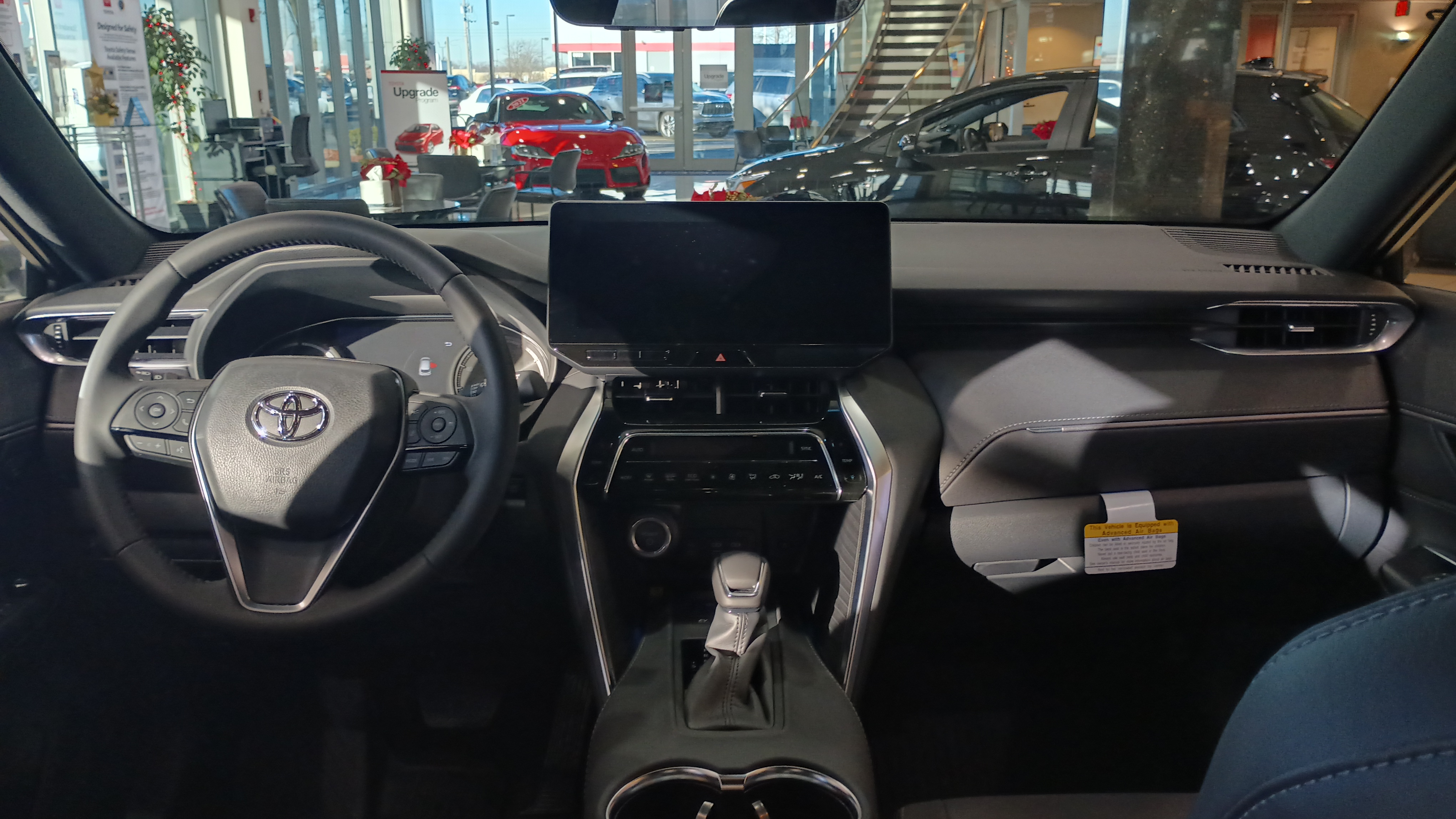
Interior

=== US yearly changes ===
- 2021, for the 2022 model year: The Limited grade was updated, with fog lights for poor weather conditions.
- 2022, for the 2023 model year: The Nightshade package is added for the XLE model, the exterior color Wind Chill Pearl (replaced the Blizzard Pearl), the Limited grade gets a 12.3" full digital instrument cluster, and features four visual styles.
- 2023, for the 2024 model year: Carryover from 2023 model year and in its final model year in the US.

=== Discontinuation ===
The Venza was discontinued in North America at the end of the 2024 model year, after which it was replaced by the Crown Signia.

== Sales ==
Calendar year	US	Canada	China
2008	1,474		
2009	54,410	12,375	
2010	47,321	12,468	
2011	38,904	13,159	
2012	43,095	11,294	
2013	35,846	9,167	
2014	29,991	7,630	
2015	21,351	6,129	
2016	589	5,971	
2017	14	1,680	
2018	9		
2019	9		
2020	13,073	1,403	
2021	61,988	6,249	
2022	33,683		
2023	29,907		29,037
2024	32,086		16,482
2025	707		3,829
