= TIRF =

TIRF may refer to:

- Total internal reflection fluorescence microscope
- Traffic Injury Research Foundation, in partnership with Toyota Canada Inc.
- Trans-inclusionary radical feminism
