= Toyota Motor Manufacturing Texas =

Automobile plant in San Antonio, Texas, U.S.

Toyota Motor Manufacturing, Texas, Inc.
- Type: Subsidiary
- Industry: Automotive
- Founded: 2003
- Headquarters: San Antonio, Texas, United States
- Key people: Frank Voss (president)
- Products: Tundra, Sequoia
- Number of employees: 3,200 (2022)
- Parent: Toyota Motor North America

Toyota Motor Manufacturing Texas (TMMTX) is an automobile manufacturing factory in San Antonio, Texas, United States. It is a subsidiary of Toyota Motor North America, itself a subsidiary of Toyota Motor Corporation of Japan. The TMMTX assembly lines currently produce the Tundra full-size pickup truck and the Sequoia full-size sport utility vehicle.

== History ==
In 2002, Toyota began scouting locations in Alabama, Arkansas, Mississippi, Tennessee and Texas for a new assembly plant to build the second generation Tundra pickup. After long deliberations including the offer of $227 million in subsidies, a 2,000-acre (8.1 km^{2}) site on the far south side of San Antonio was selected as the location for the new 2,000,000-square-foot (190,000 m^{2}) assembly plant. Toyota broke ground at the new plant site on 17 October 2003. During construction, the project evolved from a simple assembly plant into an automotive production site including several on-site suppliers which shipped directly to the factory. In addition, Toyota announced that production capacity, originally planned for 150,000 units per year, would be expanded to 200,000 units. This increase brought Toyota's investment in the plant to $1.2 billion. Following four years of construction, the first new Tundra pickups rolled off the line in November 2006 during a grand-opening celebration which drew executives, employees and dealers of Toyota from around the country. One Toyota executive went so far as to call the launch of the second-generation Tundra the 'single biggest and most important launch in Toyota's 50-year U.S. history.'

== Production ==
Second-generation Tundra production was initially split between TMMTX in San Antonio and Toyota Motor Manufacturing Indiana near Princeton, Indiana (which had produced the first generation Tundra). The Base Cab (2 door) and Double Cab (2 full doors and 2 small doors) pickups were produced in San Antonio, with additional Double Cab Tundras and all CrewMax pickups produced in Princeton. The Tundra was initially hailed as a revolutionary step forward for Toyota Trucks, winning the Motor Trend Truck of the Year award in 2008; however the vehicle's reputation was marred by a recall of 15,000 units due to a mistake made by a supplier of a rear propeller shaft. This initial problem aside, the 2007 model year Tundra was a success with sales in 2007 almost selling out annual production of 200,000 units. The surge in oil prices driven by the commodity boom in 2008 put significant pressure on sales of the truck, and Toyota sold just under 140,000 Tundras the following year.

As the economic downturn put pressure on the US auto market, combined with the high fuel prices of the mid-2008, vehicle sales tumbled in late 2008 to the extent that Toyota shut down production at TMMTX for a three-month period to reduce inventory of the Tundra pickup.

In late 2008, Toyota announced that all Tundra production would be moved to TMMTX (ending Tundra production in Princeton, Indiana). This announcement effectively preserved the jobs of the 1,850 workers at TMMTX that were threatened by the Great Recession.

In September 2009, Toyota announced it would be terminating Corolla and Tacoma production at the NUMMI assembly plant, which had been operated as a joint venture with General Motors, who withdrew from the partnership as it entered bankruptcy. This change ultimately proved to benefit TMMTX, as Tacoma production relocated to San Antonio and Toyota Motor Manufacturing de Baja California in Mexico. TMMTX added 1,000 workers to support the production of the Tacoma.

Between 2020 and 2021, Toyota ended production of the Tacoma at TMMTX as production ramped up at its second Mexico plant, Toyota Motor Manufacturing de Guanajuato.

In 2022, TMMTX began building the Toyota Sequoia large SUV, which is built on the same frame as the Tundra which was also produced at TMMI.

== Vehicles produced ==
- Toyota Tundra (2006–present)
- Toyota Tacoma (2010–2021)
- Toyota Sequoia (2022–present)

== See also ==
- Toyota Motor Corporation
- Toyota Tundra
- Toyota Tacoma
- Toyota Motor Engineering & Manufacturing North America
- Toyota Motor Manufacturing Indiana
