= Toyota Motor Manufacturing Alabama =

Automotive engine plant in Huntsville, Alabama, US

Coordinates: 34.82961°N 86.64037°W

Toyota Motor Manufacturing, Alabama, Inc.
- Type: Subsidiary
- Industry: Automotive
- Founded: 2003
- Headquarters: 1 Cottonvalley Drive, Huntsville, Alabama, United States
- Key people: Marc Perry, President
- Products: Engines
- Number of employees: 2,400 (2024)
- Parent: Toyota Motor North America

Toyota Motor Manufacturing Alabama (TMMAL) manufactures engines for cars and trucks near Huntsville, Alabama, United States. It is a subsidiary of Toyota Motor North America, itself a subsidiary of Toyota Motor Corporation of Japan. Construction of the factory was completed in 2003. The plant produced over 895,000 engines in 2024.

== Engines produced ==
- A25A-FXS I4 (2018–present) for Highlander, Sienna and Mazda CX-50
- M20A-FXS I4 (2018–present) for Corolla, Corolla Cross, and RAV4
- V35A-FTS twin-turbo V6 (2021–present) for Sequoia and Tundra
- T24A-FTS turbo I4 (2023–present) for Tacoma

=== Former production ===
- 1GR-FE V6 (2005–2015) for Tacoma
- 2GR-FE V6 (2013–2019) for Highlander
- 1UR-FE V8 (2008–2019) for Tundra and Sequoia
- 3UR-FE V8 (2007–2021) for Tundra and Sequoia
- AR engine I4 (2011–2019) for various models
- 2GR-FKS V6 (2016–2023) for Tacoma
- 2TR-FE I4 (2005–2023) for Tacoma

== See also ==
- List of Toyota manufacturing facilities
