= Toyota Motor Engineering & Manufacturing North America =

US company

Toyota Motor Engineering & Manufacturing North America, Inc. (TEMA)
- Type: Subsidiary
- Industry: Automotive
- Founded: 2006
- Successor: Toyota Motor North America
- Headquarters: Plano, Texas, United States
- Area served: United States, Canada, Mexico
- Parent: Toyota Motor Corporation
- Website: www.toyota.com

Toyota Motor Engineering & Manufacturing North America, Inc. (TEMA) is the holding company for Toyota's automobile manufacturing and research and development operations in North America. Although the company still exists for legal purposes, the company is operated as part of Toyota Motor North America.

TEMA was formed in April 2006 as the result of a merger of Toyota Motor Manufacturing North America (TMMNA) and Toyota Technical Center, U.S.A. (TTC). As part of the "One Toyota" initiative, TEMA merged with Toyota Motor Sales, USA (TMS) and Toyota Motor North America, Inc. (TMA), which controlled Toyota's corporate functions, to form Toyota Motor North America. While the three companies continue to exist in legal name, they operate as one company.

== History ==
Toyota's first manufacturing investment in the United States came in 1972 when the company struck a deal with Atlas Fabricators, to produce truck beds in Long Beach, California. The partnership was successful and two years later, Toyota purchased Atlas and renamed it Toyota Auto Body California (TABC) as part of its Toyota Auto Body manufacturing subsidiary.

In June 1977, the company established the Toyota Technical Center, U.S.A. (TTC), an engineering design and research and development subsidiary in the town of Ann Arbor, Michigan, not far from Detroit, the center of automobile manufacturing in the United States.

In 1984, Toyota would establish with GM a joint-venture vehicle manufacturing plant called NUMMI (New United Motor Manufacturing, Inc.) which would begin assembling the Toyota Corolla in Fremont, California, the first Toyota built in America. Toyota took the lessons it learned from NUMMI and went onto establish the wholly owned Toyota Motor Manufacturing Kentucky and Toyota Motor Manufacturing Canada plants in 1986.

As Toyota prepared to open more plants in 1996, the company created the Toyota Motor Manufacturing North America (TMMNA) subsidiary in Erlanger, Kentucky to oversee all Toyota manufacturing operations in North America.

TMMNA would merge with the Toyota Technical Center, U.S.A. (TTC) research and development subsidiary in April 2006 to form Toyota Motor Engineering & Manufacturing North America, Inc. (TEMA).

In July 2017, as part of the "One Toyota" initiative, TEMA merged with Toyota Motor Sales, USA (TMS), and Toyota Motor North America, Inc. (TMA), which controlled Toyota's corporate functions, to form Toyota Motor North America. While the three companies continue to exist in legal name, they operate as one company, at one headquarters campus in Plano, Texas.

Toyota continues to operate research and design centers in Michigan and in October 2017 opened a new Production Engineering and Manufacturing Center (PEMC) in Georgetown, Kentucky (about an hour from the former headquarters), to serve as the go-between for design and manufacturing.
