= Toyota Motor Manufacturing de Baja California =

Automobile plant in Baja California, Mexico

Coordinates: 32.500101°N 116.7200663°W

Toyota Motor Manufacturing de Baja California, S. de R.L. de C.V.
- Company type: Sociedad de Responsabilidad Limitada de Capital Variable (English: Limited Liability Company with Variable Capital)
- Industry: Automotive
- Founded: 10 October 2002; 23 years ago
- Headquarters: Tijuana, Baja California, Mexico
- Key people: Oscar Quijada (president)
- Products: Toyota Tacoma, pickup truck beds
- Number of employees: 3,958 (2023)
- Parent: Toyota Motor North America

Toyota Motor Manufacturing de Baja California (TMMBC) is a Toyota automobile manufacturing facility located Tijuana, Baja California, Mexico that opened in 2002. The facility currently produces the Toyota Tacoma for the North American market and pickup truck beds. The plant is a 350,000 sq ft (33,000 m^{2}) building on a site of 700 acres that has the capacity to produce 166,000 vehicles per year and employs 2,000 people.

== History ==
The plant is a 350,000 sq ft (33,000 m^{2}) building on a site of 700 acres, employing 700 people. TMMBC is Toyota's first automotive manufacturing plant in Mexico and builds Tacoma pickup trucks. The plant was built for an annual capacity of 180,000 truck beds and 30,000 Tacoma pickup trucks.

In January 2006, Toyota announced that the plant capacity would be expanded to produce 50,000 Tacoma pickup trucks, and 200,000 truck beds. The Tacoma truck beds are used for total Tacoma production. As of January 2016, Toyota reports truck production capacity of 90,000, employing 1,100.

In 2016, Toyota announced a $150,000,000 expansion of TMMBC that would increase capacity by 2018 to up to 160,000 units. In 2017 TMMBC made 104,622 Tacomas. The increased production at TMMBC was also intended to allow adjustments at their Toyota Motor Manufacturing Texas lines, which produce both Tacoma and Toyota Tundra models, to satisfy seasonal changes in Tundra orders.

TMMBC produces only V6 double cab short bed versions of the Tacoma, the most popular configuration.

In January 2017, Toyota wrote in a press release: Our manufacturing facilities in Baja, Mexico [...] support production at our San Antonio, Texas plant, where 3,300 team members produced over 230,000 Tundras and Tacomas in 2016. Before, President-elect Donald Trump had written a Tweet “Toyota Motor said will build a new plant in Baja, Mexico, to build Corolla cars for U.S.,” “NO WAY! Build plant in U.S. or pay big border tax.”

Toyota began operations in a new truck plant, Toyota Motor Manufacturing de Guanajuato (TMMGT) on 16 December 2019.

== Products made ==
- Toyota Tacoma (2004–present)

== Awards ==
For the Annual J.D. Power and Associates Initial Quality Survey (IQS) of 2008, TMMBC was awarded the Gold Plant award for Quality among all North and South American automotive manufacturing plants.
