= Toyota Battery Manufacturing North Carolina =

Future vehicle battery plant near Greensboro, North Carolina, US

Toyota Battery Manufacturing, North Carolina, Inc.
- Company type: Subsidiary
- Industry: Automotive
- Headquarters: Greensboro, North Carolina, United States
- Key people: Sean Suggs (president)
- Products: Battery packs
- Parent: Toyota Motor North America (90%); Toyota Tsusho America (10%)
- Website: toyota.com/usa/operations/map/tbmnc

Toyota Battery Manufacturing North Carolina (TBMNC) is a manufacturing plant under construction near Greensboro, North Carolina that will focus on building battery packs for electric vehicles. The company will be a subsidiary of Toyota Motor North America, itself a subsidiary of Toyota Motor Corporation of Japan. The company will also have a 10 percent investment from Toyota Tsusho America, another member of the Toyota Group, focused on producing raw materials.

When the plant opens in 2025, it will employ 1,750 people on four production lines, each capable of making battery packs for 200,000 vehicles annually, for a combined total of up to 800,000 vehicles per year.

Toyota later announced that production at the plant will ramp up through 2030. When fully operational, Toyota plans to employ more than 5,000 people on ten production lines creating batteries for fully electric and plug-in hybrid vehicles, along with four production lines creating batteries for hybrid vehicles. The 14 production lines will have a total annual production of 30 GWh.

Toyota announced the plant on December 6, 2021, with groundbreaking taking place in mid-2022.

The plant will cost Toyota US$13.9 billion to build, with the company officials saying they selected North Carolina for the new plant based on the availability of renewable energy from Duke Energy. Toyota plans for the plant to be powered completely by renewable energy.

The plant began shipping batteries in mid-2025.
