= Toyota Motor Manufacturing Missouri =

Automotive parts plant in Missouri, US

Coordinates: 38°57′49″N 90°58′09″W

Toyota Motor Manufacturing, Missouri, Inc.

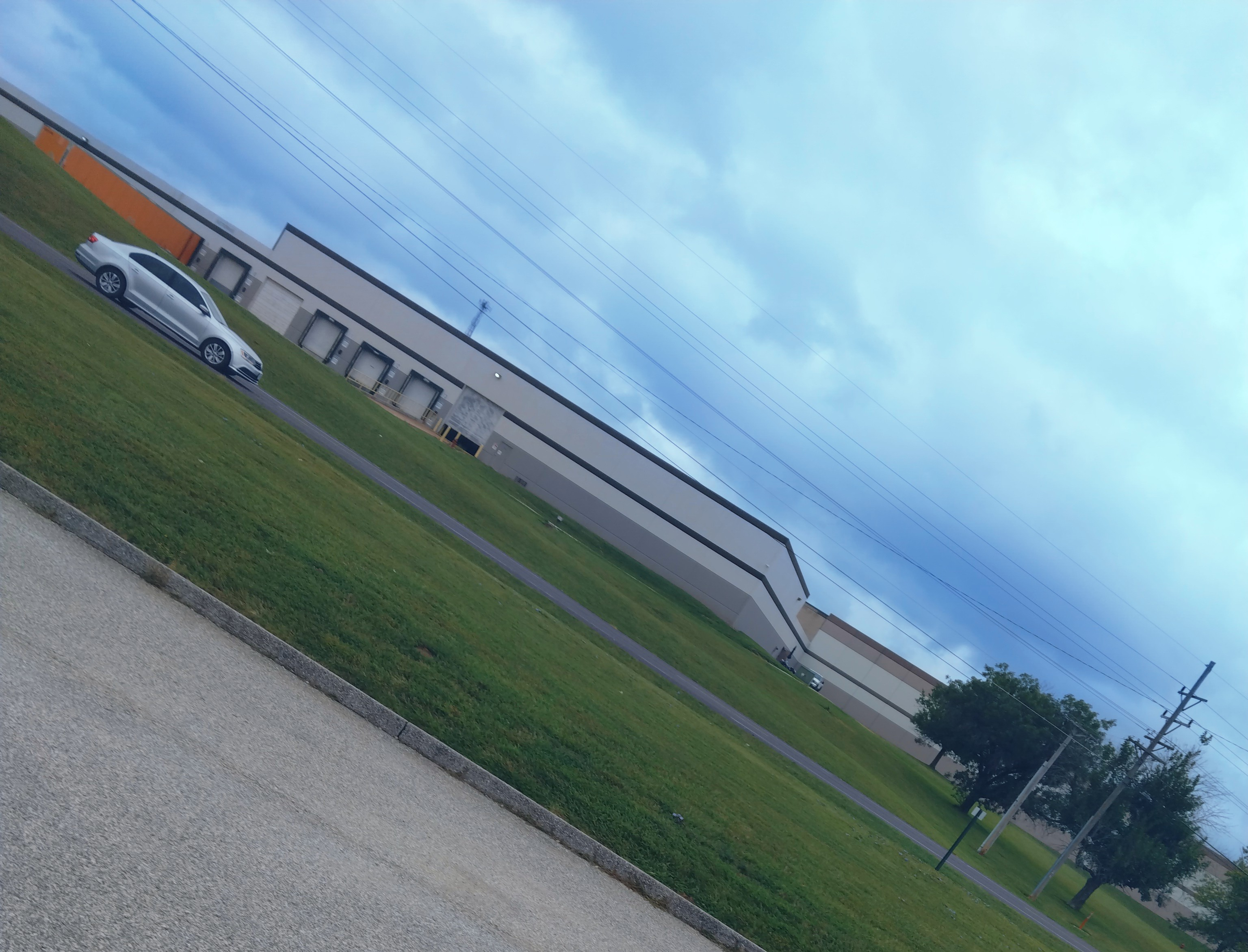
- TMMMO in 2024
- Company type: Subsidiary
- Industry: Automotive
- Founded: 1912, as Bodine Pattern Company in St. Louis
- Founder: Jesse Bodine
- Headquarters: Troy, Missouri, United States
- Key people: Wes Woods (president); Terry Henderson (general manager)
- Products: Cylinder heads; straight-four engines
- Number of employees: 1,000 (2022)
- Parent: Toyota Motor North America

Toyota Motor Manufacturing Missouri (TMMMO), formerly the Bodine Pattern Company, is an American manufacturing plant in Troy, Missouri that focuses on building cylinder heads for straight-four engines built by Toyota. It is a subsidiary of Toyota Motor North America, itself a subsidiary of Toyota Motor Corporation of Japan.

== History ==
In 1912, Jesse Bodine founded the Bodine Pattern Company in St. Louis, Missouri. Bodine produced mold castings for various customers including automotive. When Toyota started to expand its manufacturing presence in North America in the late 1980s, they turned to Bodine to supply aluminum parts. In 1990, Toyota purchased the company, renaming it to Bodine Aluminum.

In 1991, Toyota broke ground on an additional plant in Troy, Missouri that would open in 1993. Bodine Aluminum opened a plant in Jackson, Tennessee in 2003, and closed its St. Louis plant in December 2018.

In 2020, the company's name changed from Bodine Aluminum to Toyota Motor Manufacturing Missouri, while the Jackson plant became Toyota Motor Manufacturing Tennessee.

In 2021, the company gave two grants totaling to 28 thousand dollars to Mercy hospitals to pay for those affected by the COVID-19 pandemic. In 2023, they gave more grants totaling to 230 thousand dollars to the Lincoln County R-III School District and Silex R-1 School District to fund educational programs.

In 2022, Toyota funded 109 million dollars to increase salaries and produce specialized cylinder heads for electric cars.

== Production ==
Toyota Motor Manufacturing Missouri has the ability to build more than 3 million cylinder heads annually on three production lines.
