= Toyota Motor Manufacturing de Guanajuato =

Automobile plant in Guanajuato, Mexico

- Company type: Subsidiary
- Industry: Automotive
- Founded: 16 December 2019; 6 years ago
- Headquarters: Apaseo el Grande, Guanajuato, Mexico
- Key people: Mike Bafan (president)
- Products: Toyota Tacoma
- Number of employees: 1,764 (2020)
- Parent: Toyota Motor North America

Toyota Motor Manufacturing de Guanajuato (TMMGT) is a Toyota automobile manufacturing facility located in Apaseo el Grande, Guanajuato, Mexico that opened in December 2019. The facility currently produces the Toyota Tacoma for the North American market. The plant has the capacity to produce 100,000 vehicles per year and employs 1,764 people.

== History ==
Toyota announced a plan in April 2015 to open a new factory in the Mexican state of Guanajuato. The Guanajuato plant would be the automaker's second plant in Mexico, after Toyota Motor Manufacturing de Baja California (TMMBC), and its 15th in North America. The plant will be the first to be built from the ground up to be able to take advantage of efficiencies enabled by the Toyota New Global Architecture (TNGA), a company-wide effort to simplify the vehicles being produced by Toyota. At the time, Toyota announced that the plant would produce the Corolla compact sedan. Construction on the US$1 billion plant began with a groundbreaking in November 2016.

The plant became the target of an international trade dispute in January 2017 when then US President-elect Donald Trump tweeted out anger towards Toyota for building a new plant in Mexico instead of the United States and threatened additional trade barriers, in the form of a border tax if the plant was built. Toyota defended the plant and pointed out that the current TMMBC plant in Mexico supports production at the much larger Toyota Motor Manufacturing Texas (TMMTX) plant in San Antonio which produced 230,000 vehicles per year and employed 3,300 US workers at the time. The Trump administration never imposed additional tariffs on Toyota and the new United States–Mexico–Canada (USMCA) trade agreement that went into effect on 1 July 2020 allows for free trade of automobiles between the three countries as long as certain conditions are met.

Toyota announced in August 2017 that it would shift the production of the plant from the Corolla, to the Tacoma pickup truck.

The plant began production of the Tacoma on 19 December 2019 and the first truck rolled off the production line on 6 February 2020. The plant has the capacity to produce 100,000 vehicles per year and employs 1,764 people.

Between 2020 and 2021, Toyota wound down production of the Tacoma at its San Antonio plant as production increased in Guanajuato.

== Products made ==
- Toyota Tacoma (2020–present)
