= Toyota Motor Manufacturing Tennessee =

Automotive parts plant in Jackson, Tennessee, US

Coordinates: 35.5993°N 88.9409°W

Toyota Motor Manufacturing, Tennessee, Inc.
- Company type: Subsidiary
- Industry: Automotive
- Founded: 2003; 23 years ago
- Headquarters: Jackson, Tennessee, United States
- Key people: Todd Williams (president)
- Products: Engine blocks
- Number of employees: 300 (2022)
- Parent: Toyota Motor North America

Toyota Motor Manufacturing Tennessee (TMMTN) is a manufacturing plant located in Jackson, Tennessee that focuses on mold casting aluminum engine blocks and hybrid transaxle casings. It is a subsidiary of Toyota Motor North America, itself a subsidiary of Toyota Motor Corporation of Japan.

The plant was established in 2003 as part of Toyota's Bodine Aluminum division, which also operates a plant in Troy, Missouri.

In 2020, the company's name changed from Bodine Aluminum to Toyota Motor Manufacturing Tennessee. The company still shares leadership with the Missouri plant, now renamed Toyota Motor Manufacturing Missouri.

Toyota Motor Manufacturing Tennessee has the ability to build more than 2 million engine blocks annually.
