= Toyota Canada Inc. =

Exclusive distributor of Toyota and Lexus cars, SUVs and trucks in Canada

Toyota Canada

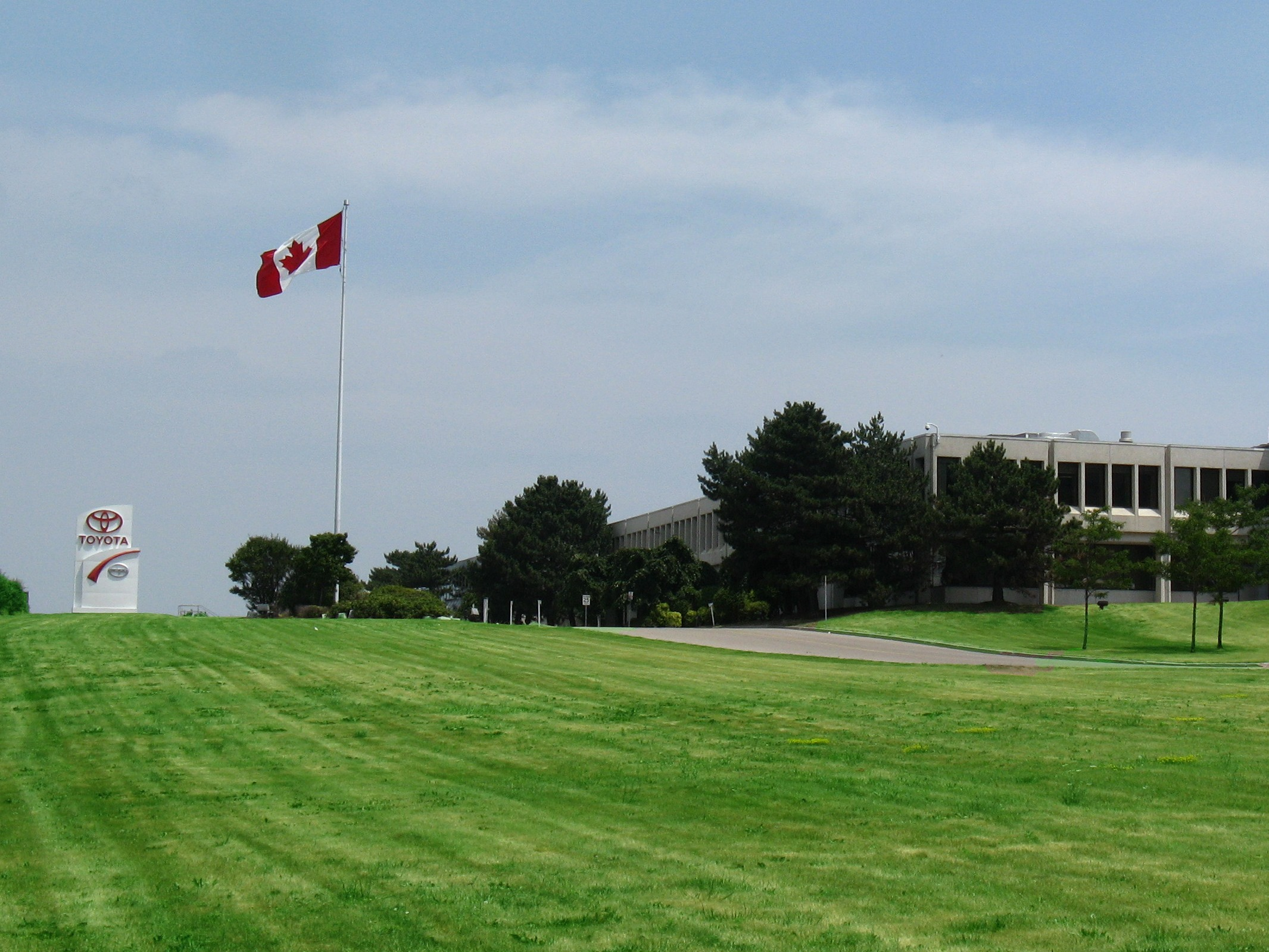
- Company type: Subsidiary of Toyota Motor Corporation
- Industry: Automotive
- Founded: 1964
- Headquarters: Scarborough, Toronto, Ontario
- Area served: Canada
- Key people: Cyril Dimitris (CEO)
- Products: Mainstream/Performance vehicles Automotive parts
- Brands: Toyota, Lexus
- Services: Vehicle leasing, Vehicle service, Automotive finance
- Owner: Toyota Motor Corporation (51%); Mitsui & Co. Ltd. (49%)
- Number of employees: 35,700 (Total); 700 (TCI); 11,000 (Toyota & group companies); 24,000 (All Toyota companies & Dealers)
- Parent: Toyota Motor Corporation
- Website: toyota.ca

Toyota Canada Inc. (TCI) is the distributor of Toyota and Lexus sedans, coupes, sport utility vehicles (SUVs), and trucks in Canada. TCI's head office is located in Toronto, Ontario. It has regional offices located in Vancouver, Calgary, Montreal, and Halifax and parts distribution centres in Toronto and Vancouver.

In January 2013, TCI became a subsidiary of Toyota Motor Corporation (TMC) with 51% ownership share and Mitsui & Co. Ltd. as minority 49% shareholder. The current CEO and president of Toyota Canada is Larry Hutchinson, who replaced Seiji Ichii on January 1, 2016.

In October 1990, TCI expanded its operations to begin selling luxury vehicles to Canadians through the Lexus brand. Twenty years later, in October 2010, TCI further expanded its sales operations to begin selling Scion branded vehicles in Canada.

In 2014, half (50%) of all Toyota vehicles sold in Canada were built at Toyota Motor Manufacturing Canada, Inc., (TMMC) while 83% of all Toyota vehicles sold in Canada were produced at one of Toyota's 14 plants throughout North America.

== Manufacturing and engineering in Canada ==
Toyota operates two vehicle manufacturing facilities in Canada: one in Cambridge, Ontario and another in Woodstock, Ontario. The Cambridge Facility currently produces the Toyota RAV4 (since 2019) and Lexus RX 350 (since 2003) and RX 450h (since 2014) and formerly produced the Toyota Corolla (1988–2019), Solara (1998–2003), and Matrix (2002–2013). The Woodstock Facility currently only builds the RAV4, which has been in production since 2007.

Since opening in 1988, TMMC has built more than 6 million vehicles for Canadian and U.S. consumers, with the vast majority (approximately 4.6 million) being exported to the United States. In September 2003, TMMC's Cambridge facility was expanded and became the first Toyota plant outside Japan to manufacture the Lexus RX. Production was further expanded in 2014 to also produce the Lexus RX 450h. It is expected to continue to be the only Lexus manufacturer outside Japan until Fall 2015 when Lexus ES 350 production is expected to commence at Toyota Motor Manufacturing Kentucky, Inc. (TMMK). In 2014, TMMC remains the largest Toyota plant in North America by production volume (579,411 vehicles) with a 15% increase in production compared to 2013.

Toyota's Canadian operation has received various awards and recognitions. TMMC's plant has earned 14 J.D. Power & Associates Plant Quality awards, including six Gold awards and two coveted Platinum Plant Quality Award in 2011 and 2014 – the first Toyota plant outside Japan to ever win this award.

Toyota also operates several parts manufacturing operations in Canada including Canadian Auto Parts Toyota, Inc. (CAPTIN), a wholly owned subsidiary of TMC which manufactures aluminum alloy wheels for the global market. Established in Delta, British Columbia in 1983, the 24,645 m². facility produced approximately 1.7 million aluminum alloy wheels and employed 310 people in 2013. In August 2011, CAPTIN and the University of British Columbia announced a partnership to refine the manufacturing process for water-cooled die casting to produce stronger, lighter, and lower-cost aluminum wheels.

Toyota Canada's Cold Weather Testing Centre was established in 1974 in Timmins, Ontario to test vehicles from across Toyota's global lineup to ensure optimal performance in cold weather conditions. With the addition of a cold chamber, Toyota test vehicles year-round in harsh sub-zero conditions to ensure that vehicles meet customer expectations.

== Environment ==
Since 2001, Toyota Canada Inc. has maintained ISO 14001 registration for an effective environmental management system (EMS). TCI's head office was the first Toyota facility in North America to achieve this certification. TCI has established a Corporate Environmental Policy which outlines its commitment towards continually reducing the daily impact of all its activities, services and operations. TCI also contributes to the publication of an annual North American Environmental Report on progress, success, and future inspirations. A number of Toyota's Canadian dealerships have also achieved LEED Gold Standard, one of the strictest levels of LEED certification.

Through the Toyota Evergreen Learning Grounds, Toyota Canada and its dealerships have contributed over $3.2 million in grants to more than 5,500 schools and impacted more than 1.15 million students through projects that transform school grounds into green outdoor classrooms since 2000.
