= Toyota Auto Body California =

Automotive parts plant in Long Beach, California, U.S.

Coordinates: 33.8715°N 118.1615°W

Toyota Auto Body Company, Inc., California
- Formerly: Atlas Fabricators; Toyota Motor Manufacturing (USA) Inc.; Toyota Auto Body California, Inc.
- Industry: Automotive
- Founded: 1972
- Headquarters: Long Beach, California, United States
- Key people: Jim Zehmer (president)
- Products: Auto parts
- Number of employees: 350 (2022)
- Parent: Toyota Motor North America

Toyota Auto Body California (TABC) is a manufacturing plant in Long Beach, California. Established in 1972, TABC was the first Toyota plant in North America. A subsidiary of Toyota Motor North America, the plant occupies 30 acres (12 ha).

The plant produces sheet metal and aluminum components, weld subassemblies, steering columns, catalytic converters, and painted service parts for Toyota's North American manufacturing facilities, for export to Toyota's facilities in Japan, and as past model service parts for Toyota Motor North America.

== History ==
The plant was established to circumvent the chicken tax, a 25 percent tariff on light trucks imposed in 1964 by the United States under President Lyndon B. Johnson in response to tariffs placed by France and West Germany on importation of U.S. chicken. While the government said the tariff was meant to curtail importation of German-built Volkswagen Type 2s, other models were also impacted, including the Toyota Hilux (also known as the Toyota Pickup). Toyota found a tariff engineering loophole: they could import "chassis cab" configurations (which included the entire truck, less the truck bed) with only a 4% tariff. When the trucks arrived in the United States, a truck bed would be locally built and attached to the chassis before being sent to dealers.

To do this work, Toyota struck a deal in 1971 with Atlas Fabricators, which would begin producing the truck beds and installing them starting in November. The partnership was successful and, in February 1974, Toyota purchased the company and renamed it Long Beach Fabricators. The plant was Toyota's first manufacturing investment in the United States.

The company would change its name to Toyota Motor Manufacturing (USA) Inc. (TMM) in March 1980. The TMM name would later be used for Toyota's Kentucky assembly plant that would begin production in May 1988. On June 6, 1988, the California plant was renamed TABC, Inc. (Toyota Auto Body California), a nod to the company's Toyota Auto Body manufacturing subsidiary.

Toyota would later say that TABC had a large role in building Toyota's pickup trucks into a major model in the U.S. on the same level as the Corolla and the Camry. In 1984, Toyota established a joint-venture vehicle manufacturing plant with General Motors called NUMMI (New United Motor Manufacturing, Inc.), which would begin assembling complete Hilux trucks in the United States starting in 1990 for the 1991 model year. However, TABC would continue to complete final assembly on trucks imported from Japan through the 1995 model year, when NUMMI began full-scale production of the Tacoma, a pickup truck designed exclusively for the North American market.

Between 2004 and 2008, TABC was the assembly location for the first U.S.-produced Hino Motors commercial truck. (Note: "Toyota to close its area truck plant". Los Angeles Daily News. April 17, 2008.)

As of December 2020, the plant produces sheet metal and aluminum components, weld subassemblies, steering columns, catalytic converters, and painted service parts for Toyota's North American manufacturing facilities and for export to Toyota's facilities in Japan, along with producing catalytic converters and numerous past model service parts for Toyota Motor North America.
