= Toyota Motor Manufacturing Canada =

Automobile plant in Ontario, Canada

Toyota Motor Manufacturing, Canada, Inc.

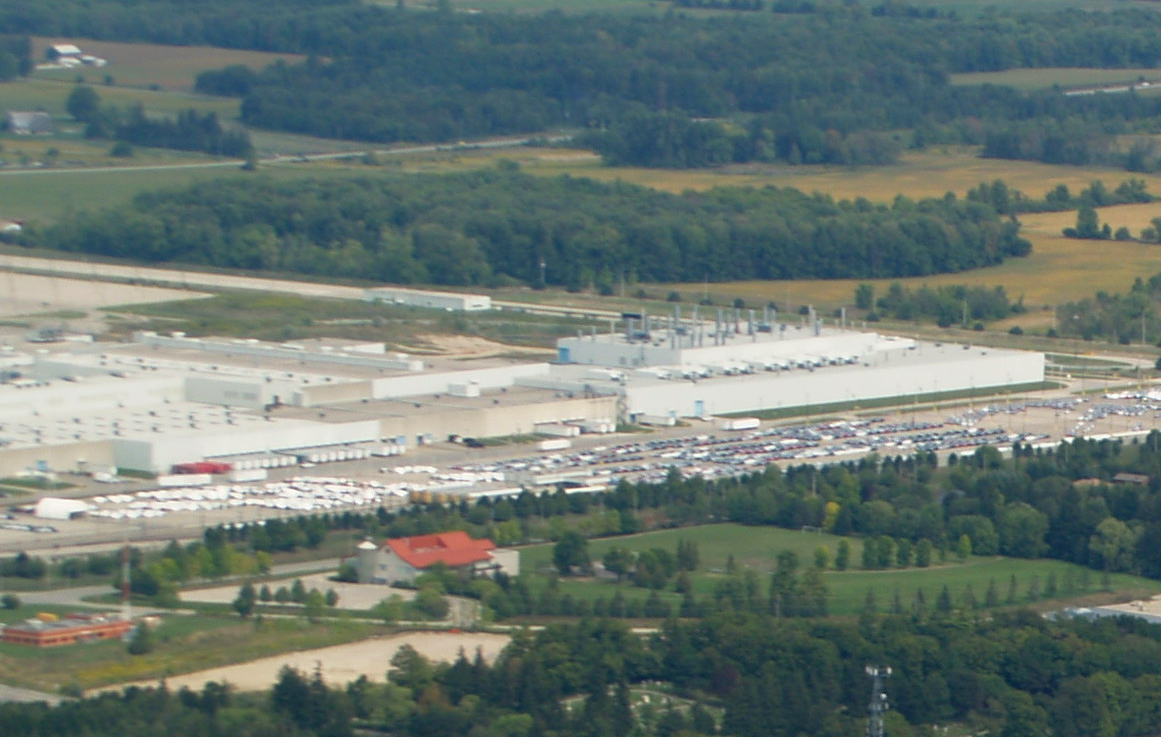
- Overhead view of South Plant at Toyota Motor Manufacturing Canada
- Type: Subsidiary
- Industry: Automotive
- Founded: December 12, 1985; 40 years ago
- Headquarters: Cambridge and Woodstock, Ontario, Canada
- Key people: Tim Hollander (president)
- Products: Toyota RAV4; Lexus NX; Lexus RX
- Number of employees: 9,700 (2020)
- Parent: Toyota Motor North America
- Website: tmmc.ca

Toyota Motor Manufacturing Canada (TMMC) operates automobile manufacturing factories in Ontario, Canada. It is a subsidiary of Toyota Motor North America, itself a subsidiary of Toyota Motor Corporation of Japan. The plant assembles compact crossover SUVs: the Lexus NX, Lexus RX and the Toyota RAV4, the company's best selling vehicle in North America.

TMMC currently operates two plants in Cambridge, Ontario, called the North Plant and South Plant, and a third in Woodstock, Ontario called the West Plant.

== History ==
The Toyota Motor Corporation announced on December 12, 1985, that it would open a plant in Cambridge, Ontario, one day after announcing it would open another plant in Georgetown, Kentucky called Toyota Motor Manufacturing USA (now called Toyota Motor Manufacturing Kentucky). The official groundbreaking ceremony took place on May 6, 1986.

The first TMMC plant (now called the South Plant) opened on November 30, 1988, producing the Corolla. Through the rest of 1988, the plant would build 153 vehicles.

TMMC announced that it would build its second facility, the North Plant on November 3, 1994. The North Plant opened on August 5, 1997, and Corolla production shifted to the new facility and the South Plant was retooled to produce the Camry Solara which would first roll off the line on June 29, 1998.

Toyota announced on April 5, 2000, that the South Plant was chosen to be an assembly site for the Lexus RX, making it the first plant outside Japan to produce a Lexus brand vehicle. To enable the changeover, production of the Camry Solara was transferred to the Kentucky plant. During the same time period, the North Plant also added the Matrix to its production. After the shakeup and retooling was complete, the first RX rolled off the line on September 26, 2003.

Together the North and South Plants cover 3,000,000 square feet (280,000 m^{2}) in space on 1.62 square kilometres (400 acres).

TMMC's announced on June 30, 2005, that it would open a third facility, in Woodstock, Ontario, about 40 kilometres (25 mi) west of Cambridge to produce the RAV4. A groundbreaking ceremony was held on October 11, 2005. The location was picked due to its educated workforce, proximity to the Cambridge plant, and being adjacent to the major transportation corridors, Highway 401 and Highway 403. Known as the West Plant, the first vehicle produced there rolled off the assembly line on November 3, 2008. The West Plant covers 1,800,000 square feet (170,000 m^{2}) in space on 4.05 square kilometres (1,000 acres).

In July 2011, the governments of Canada and Ontario gave Toyota nearly CA$142 million in grants and loans to upgrade the plants in Woodstock and Cambridge as part of the deal to manufacture the RAV4 EV in Canada.

On March 28, 2012, TMMC announced that CA$80 million would be invested in the West Plant to increase production by 50,000 vehicles a year to a new total of 200,000 vehicles per year. This created 400 new jobs at the plant.

On July 24, 2012, Toyota also created 400 new jobs at the Cambridge plant to handle increased production of Lexus RX line in two years to 104,000 vehicles.

In April 2015, Toyota announced it would retool the North Plant to allow for expanded production of the RAV4, which had grown to become the company's best selling vehicle in North America. Production of the Corolla would be transferred to another plant, later announced to be Toyota Motor Manufacturing Mississippi.

On April 25, 2019, the North Plant was chosen as a Lexus assembly site, with the first Lexus NX rolling off the line on March 30, 2022.

== Products ==
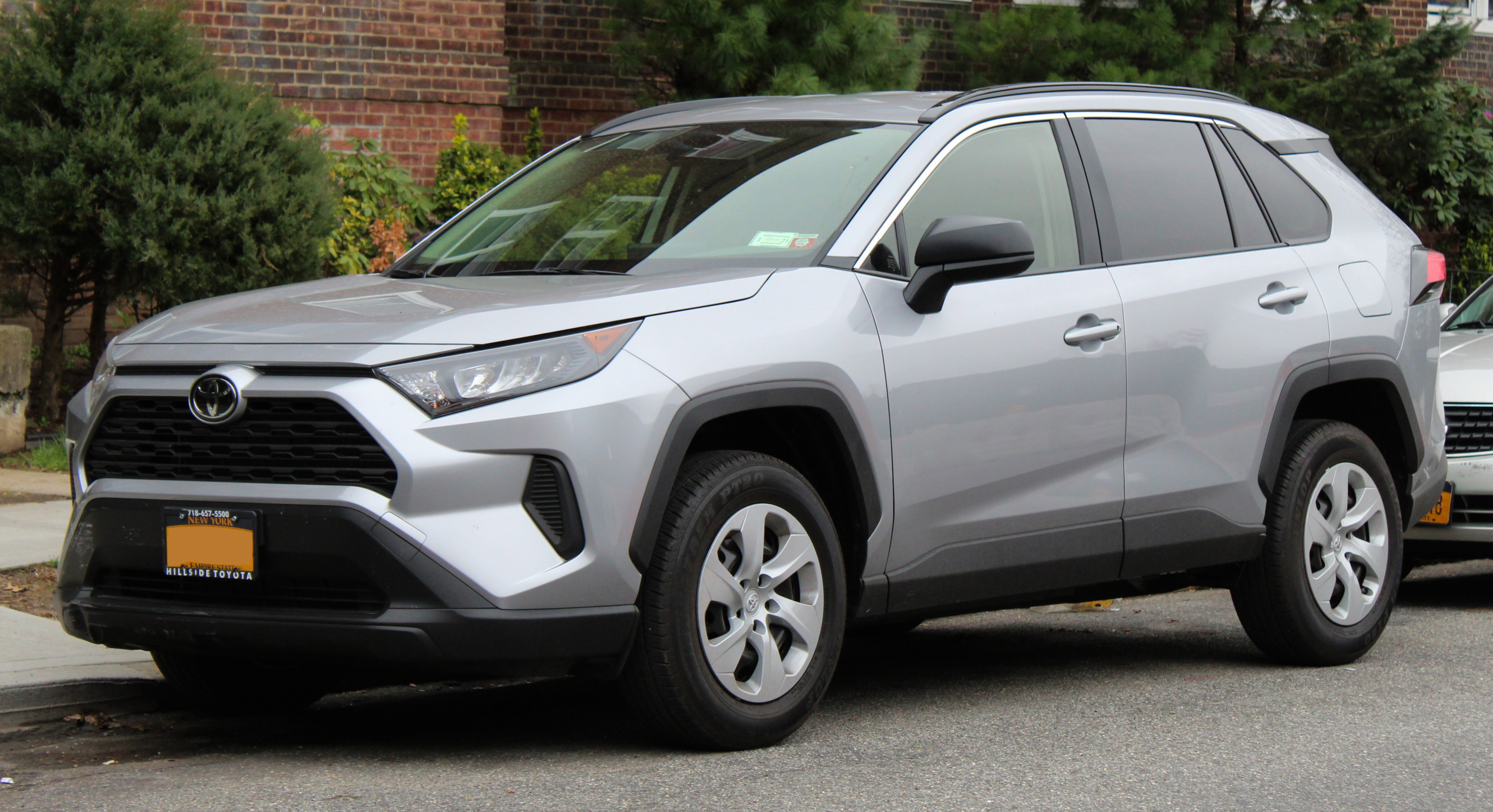
The Toyota RAV4, produced at the company's West and North plants

=== Current products ===
- Lexus RX (2003–present) South Plant (Except 2024+ RX450h+ PHEV)
- Toyota RAV4 (2007–present) West Plant, (2019–present) North Plant
- Lexus NX (2022–present) North Plant (Except 2022+ NX 450h+ PHEV)
- Hino XL West Plant

=== Former products ===
- Toyota Corolla (1988–2019) North Plant
- Toyota Matrix (2002–2013) North Plant
- Toyota Solara (1998–2003) South Plant

== Unionization efforts ==
The CAW (now known as Unifor) has attempted several times to organize TMMC. TMMC Assistant General Manager and spokesman Greig Mordue stated "Our team members will decide whether or not a union best reflects their interest... At this point in time, we don't think they have anything to gain from a union", and described the defeat of the CAW drive saying "Our team members have recognized that a third party represents a complication they don't need." Despite this, however, the CAW supported Mordue as the Liberal candidate in the 2006 federal election instead of endorsing the NDP's Zoe Kunschner; Mordue finished as runner-up behind the Conservative candidate. In August 2014, Unifor announced it was withdrawing an application with the Ontario Labour Relations Board to become the bargaining agent for Toyota employees, and called off a vote to unionize the Woodstock and Cambridge plants.

== Awards ==
Since 2005, TMMC has been named one of Canada's Top 100 Employers for 11 consecutive years by Mediacorp Canada Inc. and has been featured in Maclean's news magazine. TMMC was recognized as one of Waterloo Area's Top Employers, as announced in the Waterloo Region Record, Guelph Mercury and Cambridge Times.

TMMC has fourteen (14) J.D. Power and Associates plant quality awards, including the prestigious global Platinum Plant Quality Award in both 2011 and 2014 – at the time it was the only Toyota plant outside Japan to ever win this award. It also has seven Gold awards. TMMC was also recognized by JD Power as having the #1, 3, and 4 best assembly lines in all of North America.
