= Toyota Motor Manufacturing Kentucky =

Automobile plant in Kentucky, U.S.

Coordinates: 38.25975°N 84.53671°W

Toyota Motor Manufacturing, Kentucky, Inc.

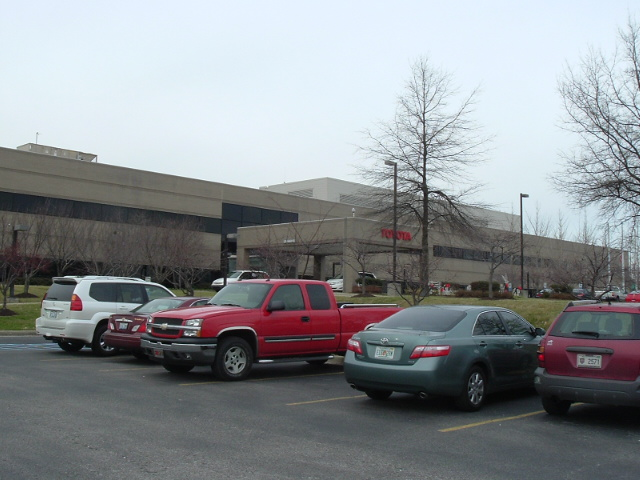
- TMMK plant and visitor center
- Type: Subsidiary
- Industry: Automotive
- Founded: January 23, 1986
- Headquarters: Georgetown, Kentucky, United States
- Key people: David Fernandes (president)
- Products: Toyota Camry; Toyota RAV4; Toyota Highlander; Subaru Getaway; Engines
- Number of employees: 10,000 (2026)
- Parent: Toyota Motor North America
- Website: tour.toyota.com#/kentucky

Toyota Motor Manufacturing Kentucky (TMMK) is an automobile manufacturing factory in Georgetown, Kentucky, United States. It is a subsidiary of Toyota Motor North America, itself a subsidiary of Toyota Motor Corporation of Japan. The plant currently assembles the company's Camry models and also manufactures engines.

== History ==
Having been active in the North American market since 1957, Toyota of Japan made its first manufacturing investment in North America in 1972 with the establishment of a company now known as Toyota Auto Body California, and established its first production line in the US in 1986 at NUMMI (New United Motor Manufacturing, Inc.), a joint-venture with General Motors.

Subsequently, and following numerous trips to Japan by Kentucky governor Martha Layne Collins in the 1980s, Toyota located a full-scale manufacturing plant in Bowling Green, Kentucky in 1985. Toyota had planned its formal announcement of plants in Georgetown, Kentucky (then known as Toyota Motor Manufacturing USA) and Cambridge, Ontario as Toyota Motor Manufacturing Canada on December 11, 1986, in Kentucky and on December 12 in Canada. Instead the news was leaked early by Sen. Mitch McConnell on December 8.

The first vehicle was assembled on May 26, 1988, a prototype 1989 model 4-cylinder Camry. In the beginning, the engines were manufactured at Toyota Kamigo plant in Toyota City, Japan and shipped to TMMK. An on-site engine plant was added from 1988 to 1992, increasing the American content to 75%. Employees were active in optimization of the production layouts and processes.

TMMK began the production of the Lexus ES sedan in October 2015, investing $360 million to accommodate the additional work, adding 50,000 vehicles annually and 750 jobs to the facility. Akio Toyoda, president of Toyota Motor Corporation, said "Lexus was founded in the United States, so it is only fitting that we are bringing the production of luxury sedans for our U.S. customers back to where the brand was born," adding "It is also fitting that we chose Kentucky because it was Toyota's first stand-alone plant in America. So in a way, for manufacturing, Kentucky is Toyota's home. It also has some of the most-experienced Toyota team members in the world." Daniel Lowry, a spokesperson for the Kentucky Cabinet of Economic Development, gave credit to the high quality of Kentucky's workforce, saying Lexus wanted its best people involved in the first U.S. expansion of the brand's manufacturing.

TMMK currently assembles the Camry sedan, Lexus ES sedan, and RAV4 Hybrid for the 2023 Model Year. It previously produced the Avalon sedan, Sienna minivan, Venza crossover, and Camry Solara coupe and convertible. The factory also produces 4-cylinder and V6 engines and powertrain parts. The plant has three automobile assembly lines (two Toyota lines and one Lexus line) with an annual capacity of 550,000 vehicles, and an engine shop with an annual capacity of 600,000 engines. In addition to assembling vehicles and engines, many plastic parts used at TMMK are made at an on-site plastics shop.

In April 2017, Toyota announced it will spend $1.33 billion at the facility and added 700 new jobs in 2017 in preparation for the model year 2018 Camry, the first example assembled on 28 June 2017. TMMK is also the first US facility to use Toyota's new TNGA (Toyota New Global Architecture) technology underpinning the 2018 Camry.

In March 2026, Toyota announced an additional $800 million investment in its Georgetown facility, to prepare production for its second battery electric vehicle, and to increase production capacity of its Camry sedan, and RAV4 crossover SUV.

== Impact ==
The Georgetown Toyota plant lead to other automakers to expand their operations in Kentucky, with numerous auto industry jobs created in the state.

== Environmental traits ==
TMMK was designated as a "zero landfill facility" in 2005. The designation means that all of the waste produced on-site is either recycled or reused and nothing is sent to landfills. Waste is composted, totalling three tons per day with excess capacity — enough that the previous manufacturing headquarters of TEMA, about an hour's drive to the north in Erlanger, Kentucky, would send their waste down for compost. The headquarters has recently relocated to Plano, TX.

The grounds also sports a very large vegetable garden. In 2005, the produce produced at TMMK helped a nearby charitable organization, God's Pantry, distribute 2.5 million pounds (1100 t) of produce, exceeding its yearly goal by 2 million pounds (930 t). The garden also produces a full crop of pumpkins used at the Toyota Child Development Center for carving at Halloween, and corn which enhances the compost pile.

== Products produced ==
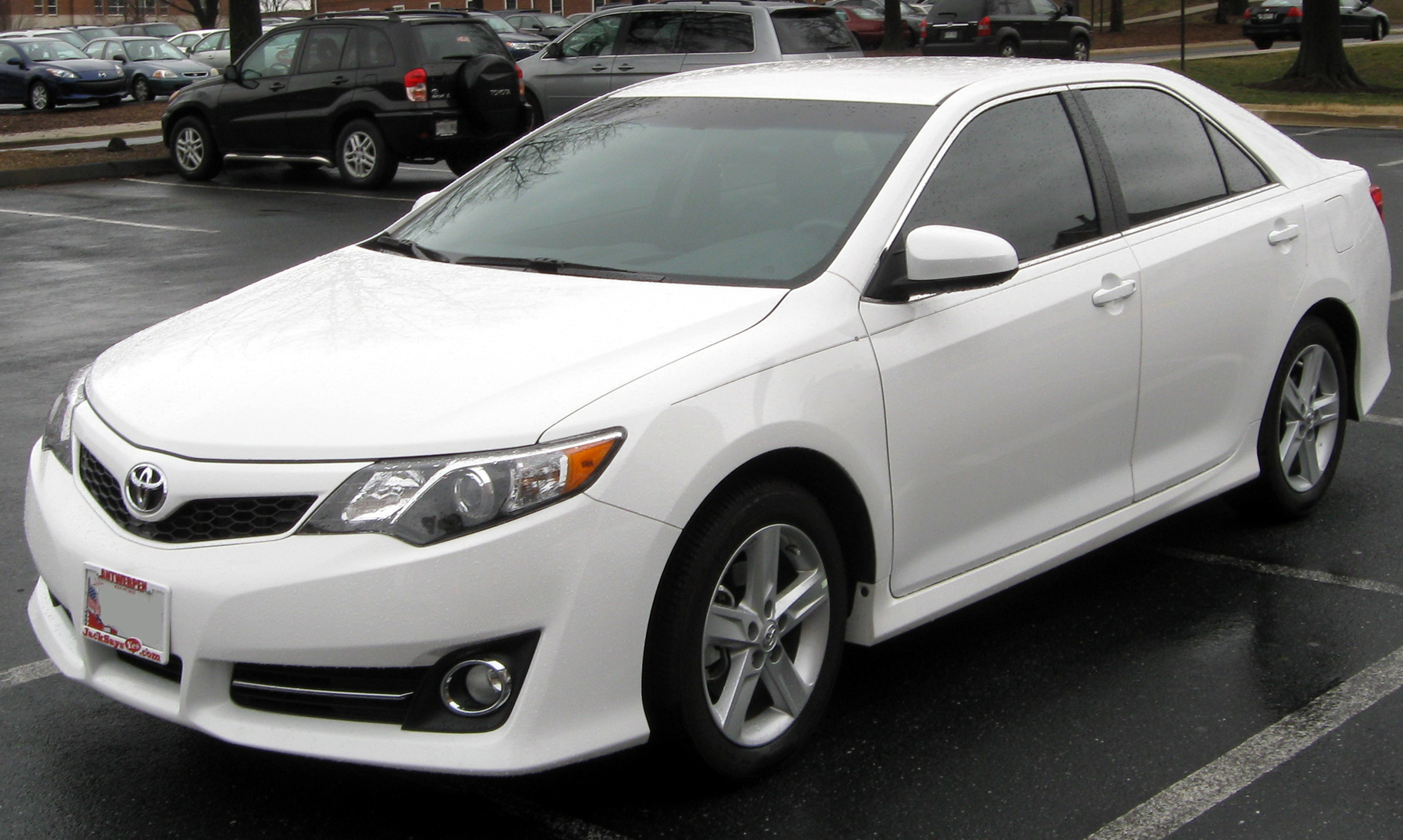
The best selling sedan in the United States, the Toyota Camry, is manufactured in Georgetown, Kentucky.

=== Automobiles ===
- Toyota Camry (1989–present)
- Toyota RAV4 (2020–present)
- Toyota Highlander (starting 2027)
- Subaru Getaway (starting 2027)

=== Engines ===
- 2.5 L A25A I4 (2017–present)

== Former products produced ==
=== Automobiles ===
- Toyota Avalon (1995–2022)
- Toyota Avalon Hybrid (2013–2022)
- Toyota Camry Solara (2004–2008)
- Toyota Sienna (1998–2003)
- Toyota Venza (2009–2016)
- Lexus ES (2016–2026)

=== Engines ===
- 1AR-FE 2.7 I4 (2009–2016) for Venza
- 2AR-FE 2.5 I4 (2009–2017) for Camry
- 2AR-FXE 2.5 I4/Electric Hybrid (2011–2018) for Camry Hybrid and Avalon Hybrid
- 2AZ-FE 2.4L I4 (2002–2009) for Camry and Camry Solara
- 2AZ-FXE 2.4L I4/Electric Hybrid (2006–2011) for Camry Hybrid
- 2GR-FE 3.5L V6 (2006–2018) for Camry, Avalon, and Venza
- 2GR-FKS V6 (2017–2022) for Camry and Avalon (made elsewhere but shipped in for 2023 Camry)
- 1MZ-FE 3.0L V6 (1994–2004) for Camry, Avalon, and Sienna (made elsewhere but shipped in for 2004–2006)
- 3MZ-FE 3.3L V6 (2004–2006) for 2004–2006 Camry SE and Camry Solara (made elsewhere but shipped in 2006–2008 for Camry Solara)
- 3S-FE 2.0L I4 (1990–1991) for Camry (engines previously made in Japan and shipped in)
- 5S-FE 2.2L I4 (1992–2001) for Camry
- 3VZ-FE 3.0L V6 (1992–1994) for Camry

== See also ==
- List of Toyota manufacturing facilities
